= List of cities, towns and villages in Isfahan province =

Isfahan Province in Iran

A list of cities, towns and villages in Isfahan Province of central Iran, first alphabetically then by county below. In the alphabetical list, cities are in bold text; all others are villages.

== A ==
Ab Garmak | Ab Kharak | Ab Malakh | Ab Shirin | Abadan | Abadchi-ye Olya | Abadchi-ye Sofla | Abad-e Eram Posht | Abad-e Soleyman | Abbasabad | Abbasabad | Abbasabad | Abbasabad | Abbasabad | Abchak | Abchuiyeh | Ab-e Sefidab | Abgarm | Abiabad | Abkesheh | Abpuneh | Abrisham | Abru | Abu ol Kheyr | Abuzeydabad | Abval-e Abbasabad | Abyaneh | Abyazan | Adegan | Afifabad | Afjan | Afus | Agarijeh | Aghcheh | Aghdash | Ahmadabad | Ahmadabad | Ahmadabad | Ahmadabad | Ahmadabad | Ahmadabad | Akbarabad | Akbarabad | Akhurum | Alavi | Alavicheh | Alezg | Ali Arab | Ali Shahedan | Aliabad | Aliabad Chi | Aliabad | Aliabad | Aliabad | Aliabad | Aliabad | Aliabad | Aliabad | Aliabad | Aliabad | Aliabad | Aliabad | Aliabad | Aliabad-e Deh Kord | Aliabad-e Gachi | Aliabad-e Jombozeh | Aliabad-e Karvan | Aliabad-e Kavir | Aliabad-e Molla Ali | Aliabad-e Pain | Allahabad | Allahabad | Allahabad | Allahabad | Allahabad | Alvar | Amadegah Shahid Mohammad Montazeri | Aminabad | Aminabad | Aminabad | Amirabad | Amirabad | Amirabad | Amiran | Amorzidehabad | Analucheh | Anarak | Anayesht | Andalan | Andevan | Aqa Gol | Arabshah | Aran va Bidgol | Arand | Arazi | Ardal | Arderancheh | Ardestan | Arenjan | Arisman | Arjak | Arjanak | Arjun | Artijan | Arusan-e Golestan | Arvajeh | Arvar | Asadabad | Asadabad | Asadabad | Asadabad | Asadabad-e Bala | Asfejan | Asgaran | Asgharabad | Ashin | Ashineh | Ashiyan | Asiyab-e Kohneh | Astaneh | Atasharan | Atr Afshan | Avanj | Ay Dughmish | Azan | Azar Khvaran | Azaran | Azizabad | Aznaveh | Aznavleh | Azvarcheh

== B ==
Bab ol Bagh | Baba Ahmad | Baba Khosrow | Bacheh | Bad Afshan | Badejan Akhureh | Badjan | Badrud | Bafran | Bagh Madi | Bagh Miran | Bagham | Bagh-e Bahadoran | Bagh-e Malek | Bagh-e Sorkh | Baghestan-e Bala | Baghestan-e Pain | Baharan Shahr | Baharan | Baharestan | Bahramabad | Balaabad | Balaabadcheh | Balan | Balan | Bam Sareh | Band Astaneh | Bandar | Band-e Karim Khani | Baqerabad | Baqerabad | Baqerabad | Baraki | Barand-e Olya | Barand-e Sofla | Barchan | Bard Asiab | Barf Anbar | Bari Karsaf | Barownaq | Barz | Barzabad | Barzok | Basinan | Bastanabad | Bavan | Bayazeh | Bazargah | Baziab | Bazm | Bazmeh | Bejgerd | Benvid-e Olya | Benvid-e Sofla | Berenjegan | Bersian | Betlijeh | Bi Bi Seyyedan | Bid Hend | Bidabad | Bidacheh | Bideh | Bideshk | Bideshk | Bidun | Bijgerd | Bodaghabad | Bolemir | Boltaq | Bonabeh-ye Maraq | Bondart | Bordakan | Borkan | Boruzad | Borzabad | Budan | Buin va Miandasht

== C ==
Chadegan | Chah Malek | Chah Riseh | Chahar Borj | Chahar Mil | Chahar Rah | Chalcheraneh | Chaleh Qara | Chaleh Qu | Cham Rud | Cham | Cham | Cham-e Alishah | Cham-e Aseman | Cham-e Heydar | Cham-e Kahriz | Cham-e Nur | Cham-e Pir | Cham-e Taq | Cham-e Yusefali | Chamgardan | Chaqa | Chaqadar | Charmahin | Charmahin | Chehel Cheshmeh | Chehel Khaneh | Chenar | Chengan | Cheryan | Cheshmandegan-e Majid | Cheshmandegan-e Olya | Cheshmandegan-e Sofla | Cheshmeh Khuni | Cheshmeh Qanbar | Cheshmeh Rahman | Cheshmeh Sard | Cheshmeh-ye Ahmad Reza | Cheshmeh-ye Ruy | Chigan | Chimeh | Chirman-e Olya | Chirman-e Sofla | Choqyurt | Chupanan

== D ==
Dakhrabad | Dalek Dash | Damaneh | Dar Afshan | Darafshan | Darakabad | Daran | Daraqeh | Darband | Darb-e Emamzadeh Ebrahim | Dargan | Darkan | Darreh Badam-e Olya | Darreh Badam-e Sofla | Darreh Bid | Darreh Bid | Darreh Howz | Darreh Sari | Darreh Shah Nazar | Darreh Sib | Darreh Sukhteh | Darreh | Darreh-ye Alucheh | Dash Kasan | Dashtchi | Dasht-e Azadegan | Dasht-e Bal | Dasht-e Enqolab | Dasht-e Latehor | Dashti | Dashtlu | Dastgerd | Dastgerd | Dastgerd | Dastgerd-e Mar | Dastgerd-e Mehr Avaran | Dastgerdu | Dastja | Dastjerd | Dastjerd | Dastjerd | Dastjerdeh | Dastna | Davaran | Deh Gerdian | Deh Kalbali | Deh Nesa-ye Olya | Deh Nesa-ye Sofla | Deh Sorkh | Deh Zireh | Dehabad | Dehabad | Dehak | Dehaq | Dehaq | Dehaqan | Deh-e Ashuri | Deh-e Bad-e Olya | Deh-e Bad-e Sofla | Deh-e Bozorg | Deh-e Now | Deh-e Rajab | Dehkaram | Dehkord | Dehlor | Dehsur-e Olya | Dehsur-e Sofla | Delgosha | Denarat | Dengezlu | Derakhtak | Devergan-e Olya | Devergan-e Sofla | Deyli | Dezej | Didejan | Dideran | Dinan | Dizalu | Dizicheh | Dizicheh | Dizjan | Dizjan | Do Rahan | Do Shakhkharat | Doba Arab | Domab | Dom-e Asman | Donbi | Dor | Dorcheh Abed | Dorcheh Piaz | Dowlat Qarin-e Olya | Dowlatabad | Dowlatabad | Dowlatabad | Dowlatabad | Dowlatabad | Dowlatabad | Dowlatabad | Dowlatabad | Dowlatabad-e Sheykh | Dowtu | Duk | Dulab | Durak | Durak

== E ==
Ebrahimabad | Emamzadeh Abdol Aziz | Emamzadeh Aliakbar | Emamzadeh Qasem | Esfahanak-e Abdol | Esfahanak-e Moshai | Esfahanak-e Olya | Esfahanak-e Saki | Esfahanak-e Sofla | Esfahran | Esfajerd | Esfandaran | Esfaranjan | Esfarjan | Esfeh | Esfehanak | Esfidan | Esfina | Eshaqabad | Eshen | Eshkavand | Eshratabad | Eskandari-ye Baraftab | Eslamabad | Eslamabad | Eslamabad | Eslamabad | Eslamabad | Eslamabad-e Makdin | Eslamabad-e Mugui | Eslamabad-e Qarakhlu | Espart | Estahlak | Estark | Eyshabad | Ezhiyeh | Eziran

== F ==
Fahiyeh | Fakhrabad | Fakhreh | Falavarjan | Fami | Faqestan | Farahabad |Farajabad | Faramush Jan | Faran | Farfan | Fariz Hend | Farrokhi | Fasaran | Fasharak | Faskhvod | Fathabad | Fathabad-e Jusheqan | Favian | Fazan | Fazlabad | Fenart | Fereydunshahr | Feyzabad | Feyzabad | Feyzabad | Feyzabad-e Hajj Kazem | Filergan | Filur | Firuzabad | Fizadan | Fudaz | Fuladshahr

== G ==
Galijeh | Ganjabad | Ganj-e Qobad | Ganjegan | Ganjeh | Garmeh | Garmuk | Gavart | Gaz | Gazestan | Gazla | Gerdab | Geshniz Jan | Gharghan | Gharqab | Gharqeh | Ghiasabad | Gishi | Gol Anjireh | Gol Darreh | Gol Sefid-e Dowlatabad | Gol va Mol | Golabad | Golabad | Golafshan | Goldasht | Golestan | Golestan-e Mehdi | Golestan-e Shahid Rejai | Golestaneh | Golestaneh | Golgun | Golpayegan | Golshahr | Golshekanan | Golzar-e Mohammad | Gonahran | Gonuiyeh | Gorgab | Goruh-e Sarhangcheh | Gowd Tappeh | Gowhar Darreh | Guged | Gukan | Gunian

== H ==
Habibabad | Habibabad | Habibak | Hadan | Haft Yaran | Haftshuiyeh | Haftuman | Hajat Aqa | Hajj Bolagh | Hajji Alvan | Hajji Fath Ali | Hajjiabad | Hajjiabad | Hajjiabad | Hajjiabad | Hajjiabad | Hajjiabad | Hajjiabad | Hajjiabad-e Shureh Chaman | Hajjileh | Halarteh | Hamgin | Hamidi | Hamidiyeh | Hamunabad | Hana | Hanjan | Harand | Haratomeh | Hardang | Haresabad | Harizeh | Hasan Robat-e Pain | Hasanabad | Hasanabad | Hasanabad | Hasanabad | Hasanabad | Hasanabad | Hasanabad-e Abrizeh | Hasanabad-e Kohneh | Hasanabad-e Olya | Hasanabad-e Sofla | Hasanabad-e Tang Bidkan | Hasanabad-e Tavakkoli | Hasanabad-e Vosta | Hasanijeh | Hashemabad | Hashemabad | Hashemabad | Hasnarud | Hasseh | Hast | Hasur | Hatmabad | Hekmatestan | Helaghareh | Hellab | Hemmatabad | Hemmatabad | Hendeh | Hendu Chub | Henduabad | Hendukosh | Hermanak | Hermedan | Hermostan | Heydarabad | Heydarabad | Heydarabad | Heydarabad | Heydarabad | Heydarabad | Heydarabad | Heydarabad-e Ali Mardani | Heydarabad-e Qur Tapasi | Hezar Jarib | Hiran | Histan | Hojjaratabad | Hojjatabad | Hojjatabad | Homaabad-e Olya | Homageran | Homam | Hombar | Homeh | Homsar | Horestaneh-ye Olya | Hormozabad | Hormozabad | Hoseynabad | Hoseynabad | Hoseynabad | Hoseynabad | Hoseynabad | Hoseynabad | Hoseynabad | Hoseynabad | Hoseynabad | Hoseynabad | Hoseynabad | Hoseynabad | Hoseynabad | Hoseynabad-e Asheq | Hoseynabad-e Ashkashan | Hoseynabad-e Hajj Kazem | Hoseyniyeh | Howz-e Mahi | Huk | Human | Hunejan | Huyyeh

== I ==
Ichi | Imanshahr | Iraj | Isfahan | Isfahan Airport

== J ==
Jafarabad | Jafarabad | Jafarabad | Jafarabad | Jafarabad | Jahadabad | Jahanabad | Jaja | Jaja | Jaladeran | Jalalabad | Jalalabad | Jalalabad | Jalalabad | Jalalabad | Jalalabad-e Marbin | Jamkan | Jan Ahmad | Janbeh | Jandaq | Jar | Jarian | Jarm Afshar | Javar | Javinan | Jazan | Jazeh | Jegarg | Jehaq | Jelvan | Jeshuqan | Jey Shir | Jezeh | Jezlan | Jeznabad | Jeznabad | Jilab | Jilanabad | Jolmarz | Jombozeh | Jombozeh | Jondabeh | Jondan | Jowharan | Jowharestan | Jowlarestan | Jowsheqan va Kamu | Jowzar | Jowzdan | Jowzdan | Jujil | Juju | Jushan | Jusheqan-e Estark | Juyabad

== K ==
Kabjavan | Kabutarabad | Kachi | Kachu Sang | Kachuiyeh | Kachumesqal | Kadish | Kafoshan | Kafran | Kafrud | Kaghazi | Kagunak | Kahang | Kahangan | Kahart | Kahgan-e Olya | Kahgan-e Sofla | Kahnaviyeh-ye Olya va Sofla | Kahriz Sang | Kahriz-e Lotfi | Kahruyeh | Kahyaz | Kaj | Kakaabad-e Olya | Kalahrud | Kalamkhvaran | Kalicheh | Kalleh | Kalmanjan | Kalut-e Mohammadiyeh | Kamal Beyk | Kamalabad | Kamalabad | Kamandan | Kamaran | Kand-e Qabrestan | Karchegan | Karchekan | Kareh Dan | Kareh | Karevanchi | Karimabad | Karimabad | Kariz | Karkevand | Karkhaneh-ye Derin | Karuyeh | Karveh | Kasegan-e Sofla | Kashan | Kashanak | Kateh Shur | Kavian | Kebrit | Kebriyai | Kejan | Kelil | Kelisan | Kelishad va Sudarjan | Kelishad | Kelishad-e Rokh | Kerch | Kersegan | Kesheh | Kesuj | Key | Keychi | Kezen | Khafr | Khafr | Khak Daneh | Khakeh | Khakpari | Khalaj | Khalat Pushan | Khaledabad | Khalilabad | Khalili | Khalti | Kham Pich | Khamiran | Khanabad | Khanj | Khara | Kharmanan | Kharvan | Kharzan | Kharzanan | Khaseh Tarash | Khatunabad | Kheyrabad | Kheyrabad | Kheyrabad | Kheyrabad | Kheyrabad | Kheyrabad | Kheyrabad | Khineh | Khomeyni Shahr | Khonb | Khorram Dasht | Khorram | Khorramabad | Khorramabad | Khorramdarreh | Khorramdasht | Khoshk Rud | Khoshkabad | Khoshuiyeh | Khosrowabad | Khosrowabad | Khozaq | Khundab | Khur | Khuygan-e Olya | Khuygan-e Sofla | Khvajeh | Khvansar | Khvansarak | Khvorasgan | Khvorchan | Khvorzuq | Khvosh Miveh | Kian | Kichi | Kifteh | Kifteh Giveh Sin | Kochur Sotaq | Kodunuiyeh | Kolartan | Koluchan | Koludan | Kolukh-e Pain | Koluseh | Komeh | Komeshcheh | Komeshcheh | Komitak | Komjan | Kondelan | Konjevan | Kordabad | Kord-e Olya | Kord-e Sofla | Koruj | Kotiabad | Kowhan | Kucheri | Kuganak | Kuhan | Kuhpayeh | Kulab | Kushk | Kushkecheh | Kushkuiyeh | Kuy-e Golestan | Kuy-e Lotf | Kuy-e Rah-e Haq | Kuy-e Rowshan Shahr

== L ==
La Sib | Laftun | Lagaleh | Laghareh | Lalan | Lalanak | Largan | Largichi | Laricheh | Lashgar Kuh | Lav | Lay Bid | Layjand | Lian | Lor Kosh | Lushab | Luteri

== M ==
Madan-e Nakhlak | Madargan | Madiseh | Mahabad | Mahdiyeh | Mahmudabad | Mahmudabad | Mahmudabad | Mahmudabad | Mahurak | Mahurestan-e Olya | Mahyar | Majdabad | Makdin-e Olya | Makdin-e Sofla | Makuleh | Malakan | Malazjan | Malvajerd | Mandegan | Mandegi-ye Olya | Mansuriyeh | Manuchehrabad | Manzariyeh | Maqsud Beyk | Mar | Maran | Maraq | Maravand | Marbar | Marbin | Marchi | Marchubeh | Margh Chuiyeh | Margh | Margh | Margh-e Gachi | Marufabad | Mashhad-e Ardahal | Mashhad-e Kaveh | Masineh | Masir | Mast Bandi | Masumabad | Masumabad | Matinabad | Maz Mehrabad | Mazeh Qaleh | Mazeh Vahregan | Mazik | Mazikcheh | Mazra-e Keymas | Mazraecheh | Mazraeh Emam | Mazraeh | Mehdiabad | Mehdiabad | Mehdiabad | Mehdiabad | Mehdiabad | Mehr Gerd | Mehrabad | Mehrabad | Mehrabad | Mehrabad | Mehrabad | Mehrabadu | Mehradaran | Mehrandu | Mehranjan-e Arameneh | Mehregan | Mehrenjan-e Otrak | Mehrjan | Menderjan | Meshkat | Mesr | Meydanak-e Bozorg | Meydanak-e Kuchak | Meymeh | Mezdeh | Mila Gerd | Milajerd | Mir Jafar | Mir Lotfollah | Mirabad | Mirabad | Mirabad | Mirabad | Mishab | Mobarakabad | Mobarakeh | Mobarakeh | Mobarakeh | Mobarakeh | Moghandar | Mohammadabad | Mohammadabad | Mohammadabad | Mohammadiyeh | Mohammadiyeh | Mohammadiyeh | Mohsenabad | Moinabad | Moinabad | Molana Safi | Monshian | Moshkenan | Moslemabad | Mowla Qoli | Mozaffarabad | Mozdabad-e Bala | Mughan | Mughar | Mulenjan | Muneyeh | Murak | Murcheh Khvort | Murkan | Murnan | Muruk | Musaabad | Musaabad | Musaabad | Musian | Muteh

== N ==
Nabar | Nahr-e Khalaj | Nain | Najafabad | Najafabad | Namzad | Nanadegan | Nargan | Nargur | Narmeh | Nasimabad | Nasrabad | Nasrabad | Nasrabad | Nasrabad | Natanz | Natanz Steel Plant | Nayyerabad | Nazarabad | Nehzatabad | Nehzatabad | Nemagerd | Nesar Abbas | Nesar-e Eskandari | Neshlaj | Neyasar | Neyestanak | Neyshabur | Neysian | Nikabad | Nivan-e Nar | Nivan-e Suq | Niyeh | Nohuj | Noqol | Nosran | Now Bahar | Now Dar Amad | Now Guran | Nowghan-e Olya | Nowghan-e Sofla | Nujuk | Nurabad | Nurabad | Nushabad

== O ==
Olunabad | Omidiyeh | Ordib | Ormak | Oshkohran | Owregan | Owshen-e Olya | Ozun Bolagh | Ozvar | Ozvar

== P ==
Padandestan | Pahlushekan | Pajikabad | Panj | Papakht | Parkestan | Parmeh-ye Olya | Parmeh-ye Sofla | Parvaneh | Parzegan-e Kharraj | Parzegan-e Sofla | Pashandegan | Pelarat | Pelartegan | Penart | Pendas | Peykan | Pileh Varan | Pir Bakran | Pirasafneh | Pudeh

== Q ==
Qaderabad | Qaemabad | Qafar | Qahderijan | Qaheh | Qahjavarestan | Qahrizjan | Qahsareh | Qaleh Abdollah | Qaleh Aqa | Qaleh Bahman | Qaleh Dar | Qaleh Ekhlas | Qaleh Emam | Qaleh Khvajeh | Qaleh Lay Bid | Qaleh Pain | Qaleh Sangi | Qaleh Sarab | Qaleh Sareban | Qaleh Sefid | Qaleh Sorkh | Qaleh-ye Amir | Qaleh-ye Amiriyeh | Qaleh-ye Arab | Qaleh-ye Baba Mohammad | Qaleh-ye Bala-ye Sian | Qaleh-ye Bertianchi | Qaleh-ye Chum | Qaleh-ye Malek | Qaleh-ye Musa Khan | Qaleh-ye Nazer | Qaleh-ye Qadam | Qaleh-ye Shur | Qaleh-ye Sorkh | Qaleh-ye Torkan | Qaleh-ye Torki | Qaleqan | Qamsar | Qanat-e Kifteh | Qand-e Nur-e Sepahan | Qarah Boltaq | Qarah Qach | Qareh Tappeh | Qarneh | Qasemabad | Qasemabad | Qasemabad | Qasr-e Cham | Qavamabad | Qayed Ali | Qayumabad | Qaza An | Qeh | Qehi | Qeshlaq | Qohrud | Qombovan | Qomishlu | Qomshan | Qorghan | Qoroq Aqa | Qorqor | Qudejan | Qudjanak | Quhak | Qurtan

== R ==
Racheh | Raddan | Rafiabad | Rahaq | Rahatabad | Rahimabad | Rahimabad | Rahiz | Rahmatabad | Rahmatabad | Rahmatabad | Rahmatabad | Rahmatabad | Rahmatabad | Rameh Char | Ramsheh | Randavan | Rangi Deh | Rara | Raran | Rashenan | Rasulabad | Rekabdar | Rezvanshahr | Riyakhun | Robat-e Abu ol Qasem | Robat-e Mahmud | Robat-e Malek | Robat-e Qaleqan | Robat-e Sorkh-e Olya | Roknabad | Rownaq | Rowshan Dasht | Rozveh | Rudabad | Rudkhaneh | Ruran

== S ==
Saadatabad | Saadatabad | Saadatabad | Saadatabad | Sabzabad | Sadat | Sadeqabad | Sadeqabad | Sadeqabad | Sadeqabad | Sadeqabad | Sadeqiyeh | Sadian-e Maraq | Safadasht | Safiabad | Sagzi | Sahamiyeh | Sahr | Sahruyeh | Saidabad | Saidabad | Saidabad | Sakhiabad | Salehabad | Salimi | Salkh-e Now | Samandegan | Sanabad | Sanbol Cheshmeh | Sang-e Sefid | Sangij | Sanjavan Marreh | Sar Asiab | Sar Avar | Sar Bisheh | Sar Cheshmeh-ye Kuganak | Sar Choqa-ye Olya | Sar Choqa-ye Sofla | Sar | Sarabeh | Sarbaz | Sardab-e Bala | Sardab-e Pain | Sarhangabad | Sarhangcheh | Sarmeydan | Savaran | Sedeh Lenjan | Sefideh | Sefidshahr | Seftejan | Seh | Semirom | Semsan | Sen Sen | Separu | Sepideh | Seresh Badaran | Sereshk | Sereyan | Seri Jahan | Seyfabad | Seyyedabad | Seyyedan | Shadgan | Shadian | Shadpurabad | Shah Cheragh | Shah Shams ol Din | Shahabad | Shahid | Shahin Shahr | Shahrab | Shahrak-e Bakhtiar Dasht | Shahrak-e Kowhan | Shahrak-e Majlesi | Shahrak-e Shahid Montazeri | Shahrak-e Vali-ye Asr | Shahrak-e Zayandeh Rud | Shahreza | Shamsabad | Shamsabad | Sharifabad | Sharifabad | Shaydabad | Shervedan | Sheybani | Shidan | Shideh | Shirazan | Shojaabad | Shurab | Shurcheh | Shurcheh | Shurghestan | Shurjeh | Siah Afshar | Siah Kalak | Sian | Sian | Sianak-e Pain | Sibak | Sibeh | Sichi | Sin | Sina | Singerd | Sivar | Soheyl | Sohr va Firuzan | Sohra Heydarabad | Sohra Khal-e Sefid | Sohra Kheyrabad | Sohran | Sohray Amiriyeh | Sohray Ghazanfariyeh-ye Jonubi | Sohray Kallah Qazi | Sohray Zareheh | Sokkan | Sokkan | Soleymanabad | Soltan Nasir | Sonuchi | Soranj | Sorkhi | Sular | Surabad | Suran | Surcheh-ye Bala | Sureshjan | Susart

== T ==
Tabaqeh | Tabar | Tad | Taherabad | Taherabad | Tahlegi-ye Sofla | Tahmuresat | Tajabad | Tajareh | Tajareh | Tajareh | Taleqan | Talkhvoncheh | Tall Armeni | Tall Changi-ye Sofla | Tall Kharowsi | Tall Mohammad | Tallabad | Tamandegan | Tameh | Taminan | Tang-e Bid | Tang-e Khoshk | Tang-e Tir | Tangestan | Tangestan | Taqiabad | Taqiabad | Tar | Tareh | Tarq | Tarrar | Tazareh | Tekyeh | Telkabad | Tidjan | Tikan | Timyart | Tin Jan | Tir Kert | Tiran | Tiranchi | Tiukecheh | Tokhmaqlu | Tonderan | Torzeh | Totmach | Tudeshk | Turan | Turzan | Tutchi | Tutgan

== U ==
Ureh

== V ==
Vadeqan | Vahregan | Vaj | Vajjareh | Valad Khani | Valandan | Valujerd | Vamakan | Van | Vanak | Vanak-e Olya | Vanak-e Sofla | Vandabad | Vandadeh | Vandish | Vaneshan | Var Posht | Varaq | Varbad-e Olya | Varcham | Vargeh Pahneh | Varguran | Varkan | Varna | Varnamkhast | Varnian | Varpay-e Olya | Varpay-e Sofla | Varposht | Vartun | Varzaneh | Vazirabad | Vazvan | Vazveh | Venhar | Venin | Veshareh | Vestegan | Viduj | Viduja | Vishteh | Vist

== Y ==
Yafran | Yahyaabad | Yahyaabad | Yahyaabad | Yahyaabad-e Bala | Yal Boland | Yarand | Yazdabad | Yazdabad | Yazdel | Yazdelan | Yek Baghi | Yek Langi | Yurtga |

== Z ==
Zafarqand | Zafreh | Zaghel | Zaghmar | Zaman Kahriz | Zamanabad | Zamanabad | Zamanabad | Zamenabad | Zanjanbar | Zaranjan | Zard Fahreh | Zard Khoshuiyeh | Zardanjan | Zarghamabad | Zarneh | Zarrin Shahr | Zavan | Zavareh | Zayandeh Rud | Zayandeh Rud Cultural and Recreational Village | Zazeran | Zederk | Zefreh | Zemestaneh | Ziadabad | Ziar | Ziaratgah | Ziaratgah | Zibashahr | Zudan | Zuruki
