= Ostandari Isfahan =

- Emblem of Iran

Agency overview
- Jurisdiction: Isfahan Province
- Headquarters: 32°39′21″N 51°40′20″E Ostandari street
- Parent department: Ministry of Interior (Iran)
- Website: ostan-es.ir

Isfahan Province Governorate is the representative office of Government of Islamic Republic of Iran in Isfahan province. Its secretariat is located in Isfahan city.

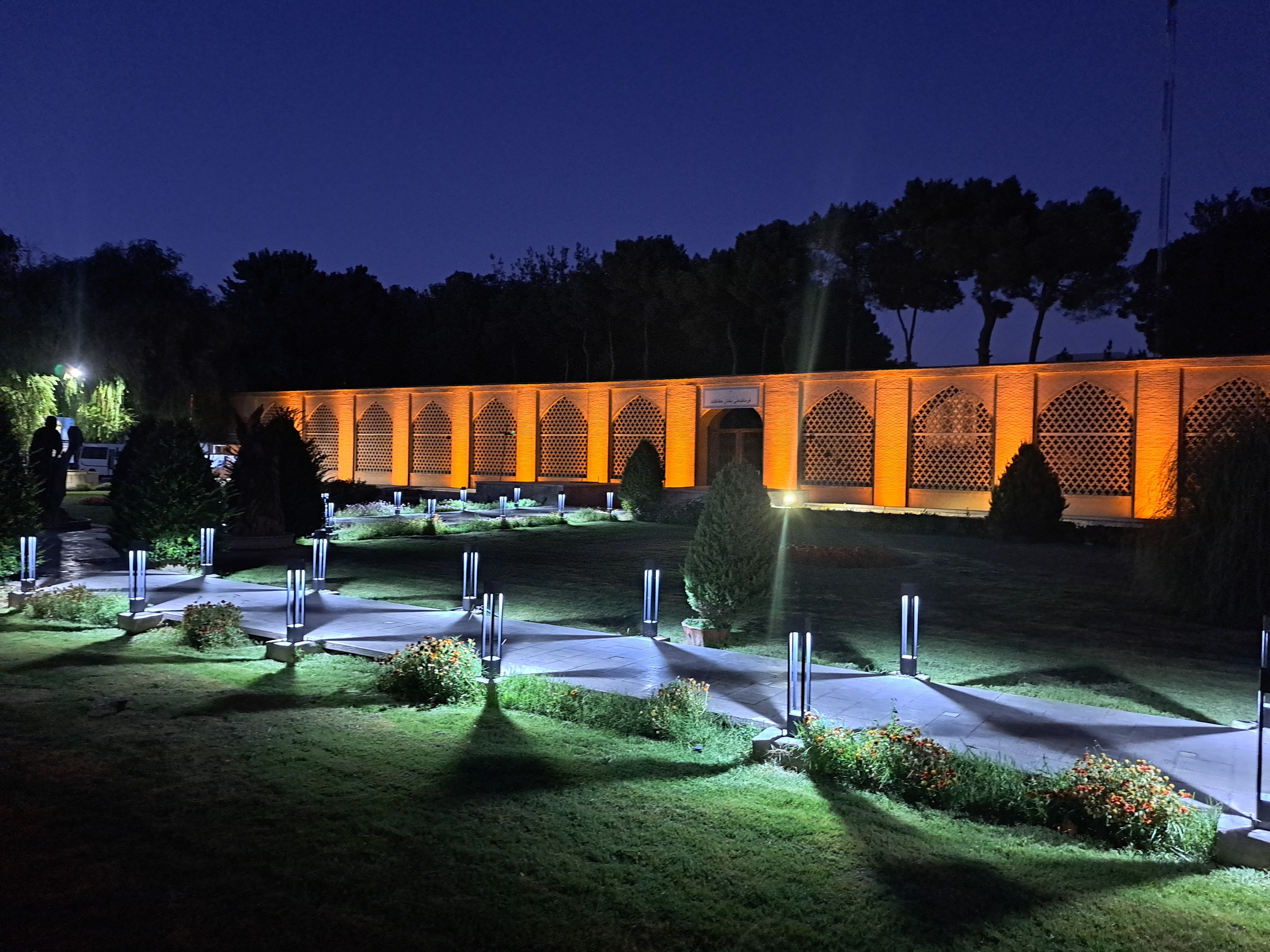
Ostandari Esfahan

== Administration ==
Isfahan is in region two according to regions of Iran.In May 2020 in Islamic Consultative Assembly there was a discussion that counties, Kashan, Khansar, Naein, Golpayegan, Ardestan, Aran va bidgol, Natanz and Khur and biabanak, seceded create a North Isfahan Province called Golsaran.

== Programs ==
In 2023 Zimbabwe sent university students to Isfahan for nanotech after talks between ambassador and general governor.

== See also ==
- Category:Cities in Isfahan Province
- List of cities, towns and villages in Isfahan Province
