= Vanak (disambiguation) =

Vanak is a neighbourhood in the northern part of Tehran, capital of Iran.

Vanak (Persian: ونك) may also refer to:

- Vanak, Hormozgan, a village in Jask County, Hormozgan Province, Iran
- Vanak, Isfahan, city in Semirom County, Isfahan Province, Iran
- Vanak-e Olya, a village in Chadegan County, Isfahan Province, Iran
- Vanak-e Sofla, a village in Chadegan County, Isfahan Province, Iran
- Vanak, Markazi, a village in Komijan County, Markazi Province, Iran
- Avanak, Alborz, village in Taleqan County, Alborz Province, Iran
- Vanak Rural District, in Isfahan Province

== Surname ==
Vanak or Vanek is also a Czech and Slovak surname. Notable people with this surname include:

- John Vanak, American basketball referee
- Michal Vanák (born 1986), Slovak footballer
