= Varcham =

Varcham ورچم
- Village
- Location within Iran
- Coordinates: 32°43′59″N 52°55′40″E
- Country: Iran
- Province: Isfahan
- County: Nain
- Bakhsh: Central
- Rural District: Lay Siyah

Population (2006)
  - Total: 9
- Time zone: UTC+3:30 (IRST)
  - Summer (DST): UTC+4:30 (IRDT)

Varcham (Persian: ورچم; also known as Khar Cham) is a village in Lay Siyah Rural District, in the Central District of Nain County, Isfahan Province, Iran. At the 2006 census, its population was 9, in 4 families.
