= Bidacheh =

Bidacheh بيدچه
- Village
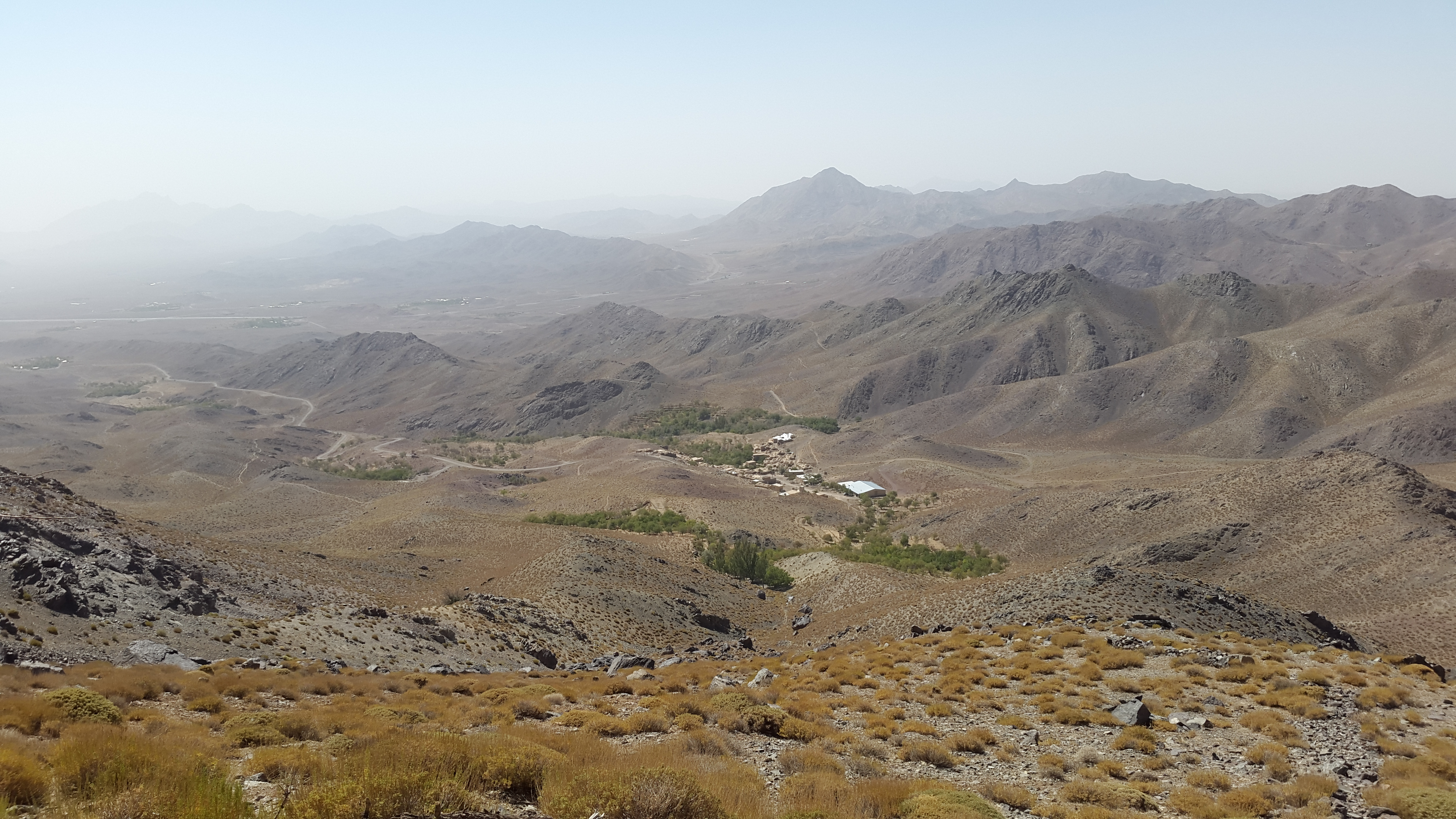

- Location within Iran
- Coordinates: 32°45′27″N 52°50′59″E
- Country: Iran
- Province: Isfahan
- County: Nain
- Bakhsh: Central
- Rural District: Lay Siyah

Population (2006)
  - Total: 37
- Time zone: UTC+3:30 (IRST)
  - Summer (DST): UTC+4:30 (IRDT)

Bidacheh (Persian: بيدچه, also Romanized as Bīdacheh) is a village in Lay Siyah Rural District, in the Central District of Nain County, Isfahan Province, Iran. At the 2006 census, its population was 37, in 17 families.
