= Vamakan =

Vamakan ومكان
- Village
- Location within Iran
- Coordinates: 33°06′41″N 52°13′59″E
- Country: Iran
- Province: Isfahan
- County: Ardestan
- Bakhsh: Central
- Rural District: Olya

Population (2006)
  - Total: 85
- Time zone: UTC+3:30 (IRST)
  - Summer (DST): UTC+4:30 (IRDT)

Vamakan (Persian: ومكان, also Romanized as Vamakān and Vamkān) is a village in Olya Rural District, in the Central District of Ardestan County, Isfahan Province, Iran. At the 2006 census, its population was 85, in 29 families.
