= Nasrabad, Nain =

Nasrabad نصراباد
- Village
- Location within Iran
- Coordinates: 32°39′03″N 52°54′08″E
- Country: Iran
- Province: Isfahan
- County: Nain
- Bakhsh: Central
- Rural District: Lay Siyah

Population (2006)
  - Total: 18
- Time zone: UTC+3:30 (IRST)
  - Summer (DST): UTC+4:30 (IRDT)

Nasrabad (Persian: نصراباد, also Romanized as Naşrābād, Nasr Abad, and Nāşerābād; also known as Naşīrābād and Nāsirābād) is a village in Lay Siyah Rural District, in the Central District of Nain County, Isfahan Province, Iran. At the 2006 census, its population was 18, in 8 families.
