= Komeshcheh, Ardestan =

Komeshcheh كمشچه
- Village
- Location within Iran
- Coordinates: 33°13′52″N 52°03′19″E
- Country: Iran
- Province: Isfahan
- County: Ardestan
- Bakhsh: Central
- Rural District: Olya

Population (2006)
  - Total: 63
- Time zone: UTC+3:30 (IRST)
  - Summer (DST): UTC+4:30 (IRDT)

Komeshcheh (Persian: كمشچه, also Romanized as Komshecheh) is a village in Olya Rural District, in the Central District of Ardestan County, Isfahan Province, Iran. At the 2006 census, its population was 63, in 25 families.
