= Mobarakeh, Ardestan =

Mobarakeh مباركه
- Village
- Location within Iran
- Coordinates: 33°03′08″N 52°25′01″E
- Country: Iran
- Province: Isfahan
- County: Ardestan
- Bakhsh: Central
- Rural District: Barzavand

Population (2006)
  - Total: 29
- Time zone: UTC+3:30 (IRST)
  - Summer (DST): UTC+4:30 (IRDT)

Mobarakeh (Persian: مباركه, also Romanized as Mobārakeh and Mobārekeh) is a village in Barzavand Rural District, in the Central District of Ardestan County, Isfahan Province, Iran. At the 2006 census, its population was 29, in 17 families.
