= Soleymanabad, Isfahan =

Soleymanabad سليمان اباد
- Village
- Location within Iran
- Coordinates: 33°00′30″N 52°27′39″E
- Country: Iran
- Province: Isfahan
- County: Ardestan
- Bakhsh: Central
- Rural District: Barzavand

Population (2006)
  - Total: 22
- Time zone: UTC+3:30 (IRST)
  - Summer (DST): UTC+4:30 (IRDT)

Soleymanabad (Persian: سليمان اباد, also Romanized as Soleymānābād; also known as Sulaimānābād) is a village in Barzavand Rural District, in the Central District of Ardestan County, Isfahan Province, Iran. At the 2006 census, its population was 22, in 11 families.
