= Kebriyai =

Kebriyai كبريائي
- Village
- Country: Iran
- Province: Isfahan
- County: Nain
- Bakhsh: Central
- Rural District: Baharestan

Population (2006)
  - Total: 15
- Time zone: UTC+3:30 (IRST)
  - Summer (DST): UTC+4:30 (IRDT)

Kebriyai (Persian: كبريائي, also Romanized as Kebrīyā’ī) is a village in Baharestan Rural District, in the Central District of Nain County, Isfahan Province, Iran. At the 2006 census, its population was 15, in 5 families.
