= Mar, Isfahan =

Mar مار
- Village
- Location within Iran
- Coordinates: 33°02′24″N 52°25′46″E
- Country: Iran
- Province: Isfahan
- County: Ardestan
- Bakhsh: Central
- Rural District: Barzavand

Population (2006)
  - Total: 61
- Time zone: UTC+3:30 (IRST)
  - Summer (DST): UTC+4:30 (IRDT)

Mar (Persian: مار, also Romanized as Mār) is a village in Barzavand Rural District, in the Central District of Ardestan County, Isfahan Province, Iran. In the 2006 census, its population was 61, in 26 families.
