= Zaghel =

Zaghel زاغل
- Village
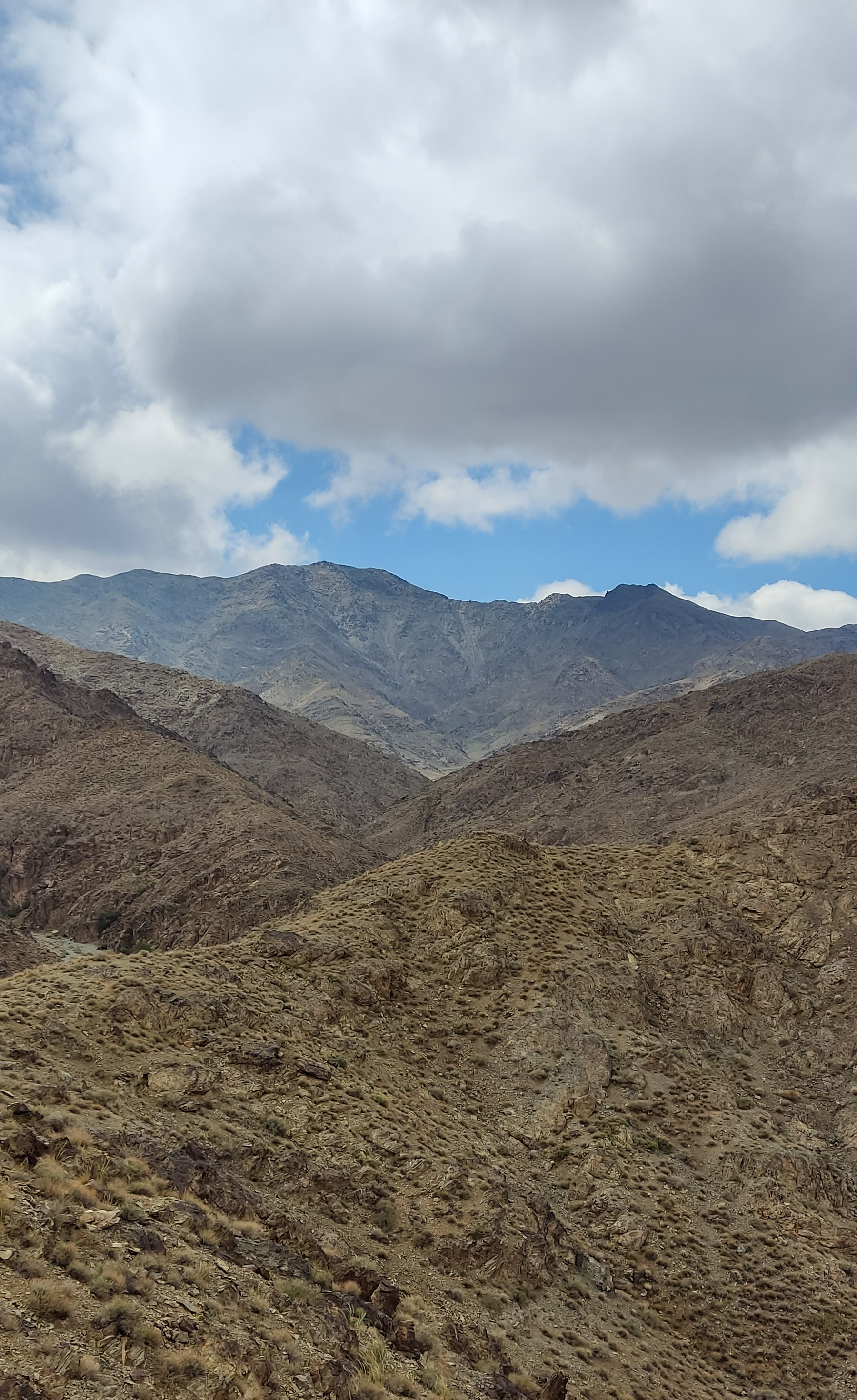
- Zaghel Village, Ardestan County, Iran

- Location within Iran
- Coordinates: 33°14′55″N 52°36′08″E
- Country: Iran
- Province: Isfahan
- County: Ardestan
- Bakhsh: Central
- Rural District: Kachu

Population (2006)
  - Total: 24
- Time zone: UTC+3:30 (IRST)
  - Summer (DST): UTC+4:30 (IRDT)

Zaghel (Persian: زاغل, also Romanized as Zāghel, Zāghal, and Z̄āghel) is a village in Kachu Rural District, in the Central District of Ardestan County, Isfahan Province, Iran. At the 2006 census, its population was 24, in 9 families.
