= Ashineh =

Ashineh اشينه
- Village
- Location within Iran
- Coordinates: 32°58′15″N 52°34′04″E
- Country: Iran
- Province: Isfahan
- County: Ardestan
- Bakhsh: Central
- Rural District: Barzavand

Population (2006)
  - Total: 42
- Time zone: UTC+3:30 (IRST)
  - Summer (DST): UTC+4:30 (IRDT)

Ashineh (Persian: اشينه, also Romanized as ‘Ashīneh and ‘Ashīneh; also known as Ashnīyeh) is a village in Barzavand Rural District, in the Central District of Ardestan County, Isfahan Province, Iran. At the 2006 census, its population was 42, in 17 families.
