= Chah Riseh =

Chah Riseh چاه ريسه
- Village
- Location within Iran
- Coordinates: 32°59′42″N 52°05′53″E
- Country: Iran
- Province: Isfahan
- County: Ardestan
- Bakhsh: Central
- Rural District: Olya

Population (2006)
  - Total: 94
- Time zone: UTC+3:30 (IRST)
  - Summer (DST): UTC+4:30 (IRDT)

Chah Riseh (Persian: چاه ريسه, also Romanized as Chāh Rīseh and Chāharīseh; also known as Chārsen) is a village in Olya Rural District, in the Central District of Ardestan County, Isfahan Province, Iran. At the 2006 census, its population was 94, in 33 families.
