= Faskhvod =

Faskhvod فسخود
- Village
- Location within Iran
- Coordinates: 33°15′06″N 52°00′51″E
- Country: Iran
- Province: Isfahan
- County: Ardestan
- Bakhsh: Central
- Rural District: Olya

Population (2006)
  - Total: 89
- Time zone: UTC+3:30 (IRST)
  - Summer (DST): UTC+4:30 (IRDT)

Faskhvod (Persian: فسخود, also Romanized as Fasakhowd, Fasakhūd, Faskhowd, and Faskhūd; also known as Fassakhod) is a village in Olya Rural District, in the Central District of Ardestan County, Isfahan Province, Iran. At the 2006 census, its population was 89, in 40 families.
