= Balaabad =

Balaabad بلااباد
- Village
- Location within Iran
- Coordinates: 32°44′32″N 52°54′14″E
- Country: Iran
- Province: Isfahan
- County: Nain
- Bakhsh: Central
- Rural District: Lay Siyah

Population (2006)
  - Total: 36
- Time zone: UTC+3:30 (IRST)
  - Summer (DST): UTC+4:30 (IRDT)

Balaabad (Persian: بلااباد, also Romanized as Balāābād; also known as Balā Bād) is a village in Lay Siyah Rural District, in the Central District of Nain County, Isfahan Province, Iran. At the 2006 census, its population was 36, in 14 families.
