= Jamkan =

Jamkan جامكان
- Village
- Location within Iran
- Coordinates: 32°53′10″N 52°45′24″E
- Country: Iran
- Province: Isfahan
- County: Nain
- Bakhsh: Central
- Rural District: Kuhestan

Population (2006)
  - Total: 15
- Time zone: UTC+3:30 (IRST)
  - Summer (DST): UTC+4:30 (IRDT)

Jamkan (Persian: جامكان, also Romanized as Jāmkān) is a village in Kuhestan Rural District, in the Central District of Nain County, Isfahan Province, Iran. At the 2006 census, its population was 15, in 8 families.
