= Zuruki =

Zuruki زوروكي
- Village
- Location within Iran
- Coordinates: 32°52′13″N 52°39′08″E
- Country: Iran
- Province: Isfahan
- County: Nain
- Bakhsh: Central
- Rural District: Baharestan

Population (2006)
  - Total: 8
- Time zone: UTC+3:30 (IRST)
  - Summer (DST): UTC+4:30 (IRDT)

Zuruki (Persian: زوروكي, also Romanized as Zūrūkī; also known as Zūrūgī) is a village in Baharestan Rural District, in the Central District of Nain County, Isfahan Province, Iran. At the 2006 census, its population was 8, in 4 families.
