= Margh Chuiyeh =

Margh Chuiyeh مرغ چوييه
- Village
- Location within Iran
- Coordinates: 32°47′53″N 52°52′47″E
- Country: Iran
- Province: Isfahan
- County: Nain
- Bakhsh: Central
- Rural District: Lay Siyah

Population (2006)
  - Total: 21
- Time zone: UTC+3:30 (IRST)
  - Summer (DST): UTC+4:30 (IRDT)

Margh Chuiyeh (Persian: مرغ چوييه, also Romanized as Margh Chūīyeh; also known as Mārchū and Mārchū’īyeh) is a village in Lay Siyah Rural District, in the Central District of Nain County, Isfahan Province, Iran. At the 2006 census, its population was 21, in 8 families.
