= Muneyeh, Isfahan =

Muneyeh مونيه
- Village
- Location within Iran
- Coordinates: 33°12′00″N 52°16′00″E
- Country: Iran
- Province: Isfahan
- County: Ardestan
- Bakhsh: Central
- Rural District: Olya

Population (2006)
  - Total: 15
- Time zone: UTC+3:30 (IRST)
  - Summer (DST): UTC+4:30 (IRDT)

Muneyeh (Persian: مونيه, also Romanized as Mūneyeh; also known as Mūneyeh Soflá) is a village in Olya Rural District, in the Central District of Ardestan County, Isfahan Province, Iran. At the 2006 census, its population was 15, in 6 families.
