= Gazla =

Gazla گزلا
- Village
- Location within Iran
- Coordinates: 33°29′31″N 52°40′57″E
- Country: Iran
- Province: Isfahan
- County: Ardestan
- Bakhsh: Central
- Rural District: Kachu

Population (2006)
  - Total: 14
- Time zone: UTC+3:30 (IRST)
  - Summer (DST): UTC+4:30 (IRDT)

Gazla (Persian: گزلا, also Romanized as Gazlā; also known as Gazlā Pā’īn) is a village in Kachu Rural District, in the Central District of Ardestan County, Isfahan Province, Iran. At the 2006 census, its population was 14, in 4 families.
