= Khaseh Tarash =

Khaseh Tarash خاصه تراش
- Village
- Location within Iran
- Coordinates: 33°01′16″N 52°00′29″E
- Country: Iran
- Province: Isfahan
- County: Ardestan
- Bakhsh: Central
- Rural District: Olya

Population (2006)
  - Total: 35
- Time zone: UTC+3:30 (IRST)
  - Summer (DST): UTC+4:30 (IRDT)

Khaseh Tarash (Persian: خاصه تراش, also Romanized as Khāşeh Tarāsh; also known as Khavāş Tarāsh) is a village in Olya Rural District, in the Central District of Ardestan County, Isfahan Province, Iran. At the 2006 census, its population was 35, in 9 families.
