= Kodunuiyeh =

Kodunuiyeh كدونوئيه
- Village
- Location within Iran
- Coordinates: 32°43′14″N 53°01′45″E
- Country: Iran
- Province: Isfahan
- County: Nain
- Bakhsh: Central
- Rural District: Lay Siyah

Population (2006)
  - Total: 110
- Time zone: UTC+3:30 (IRST)
  - Summer (DST): UTC+4:30 (IRDT)

Kodunuiyeh (Persian: كدونوئيه, also Romanized as Kodūnū’īyeh and Kedūnū’īyeh; also known as Kadnoo’iyeh, Kodnū’īyeh, Kodonūīyeh, and Kudnuyeh) is a village in Lay Siyah Rural District, in the Central District of Nain County, Isfahan Province, Iran. At the 2006 census, its population was 110, in 40 families.
