= Maz Mehrabad =

Maz Mehrabad مازمهراباد
- Village
- Location within Iran
- Coordinates: 32°48′37″N 52°49′47″E
- Country: Iran
- Province: Isfahan
- County: Nain
- Bakhsh: Central
- Rural District: Kuhestan

Population (2006)
  - Total: 16
- Time zone: UTC+3:30 (IRST)
  - Summer (DST): UTC+4:30 (IRDT)

Maz Mehrabad (Persian: مازمهراباد, also Romanized as Māz Mehrābād; also known as Mazmeh Abad and Mazmirābād) is a village in Kuhestan Rural District, in the Central District of Nain County, Isfahan Province, Iran. At the 2006 census, its population was 16, in 6 families.
