= Golshekanan Castle =

Castle in Isfahan Province, Iran

Golshekanan castle
- قلعه گل شکنان

General information
- Type: Castle
- Location: Ardestan County, Iran

Golshekanan castle (Persian: قلعه گل شکنان) is a historical castle located in Isfahan Province in Ardestan County, The longevity of this fortress dates back to the Safavid dynasty.
