= Now Bahar, Isfahan =

Now Bahar نوبهار
- Village
- Location within Iran
- Coordinates: 32°55′59″N 52°45′30″E
- Country: Iran
- Province: Isfahan
- County: Nain
- Bakhsh: Central
- Rural District: Baharestan

Population (2006)
  - Total: 21
- Time zone: UTC+3:30 (IRST)
  - Summer (DST): UTC+4:30 (IRDT)

Now Bahar (Persian: نوبهار, also Romanized as Now Bahār) is a village in Baharestan Rural District, in the Central District of Nain County, Isfahan Province, Iran. At the 2006 census, its population was 21, in 7 families.
