= Turan, Isfahan =

Turan طوران
- Village
- Location within Iran
- Coordinates: 32°59′25″N 52°38′55″E
- Country: Iran
- Province: Isfahan
- County: Ardestan
- Bakhsh: Central
- Rural District: Barzavand

Population (2006)
  - Total: 21
- Time zone: UTC+3:30 (IRST)
  - Summer (DST): UTC+4:30 (IRDT)

Turan (Persian: طوران, also Romanized as Ţūrān and Tūrān) is a village in Barzavand Rural District, in the Central District of Ardestan County, Isfahan Province, Iran. At the 2006 census, its population was 21, in 14 families.
