= Balaabadcheh =

Balaabadcheh بلاابادچه
- Village
- Location within Iran
- Coordinates: 32°44′23″N 52°53′43″E
- Country: Iran
- Province: Isfahan
- County: Nain
- Bakhsh: Central
- Rural District: Lay Siyah

Population (2006)
  - Total: 31
- Time zone: UTC+3:30 (IRST)
  - Summer (DST): UTC+4:30 (IRDT)

Balaabadcheh (Persian: بلاابادچه, also Romanized as Balāābādcheh; also known as Balā Bādcheh and Balābādcheh) is a village in Lay Siyah Rural District, in the Central District of Nain County, Isfahan Province, Iran. At the 2006 census, its population was 31, in 12 families.
