= Najafabad, Nain =

Najafabad نجف آباد
- Village
- Location within Iran
- Coordinates: 32°55′14″N 52°43′43″E
- Country: Iran
- Province: Isfahan
- County: Nain
- Bakhsh: Central
- Rural District: Baharestan

Population (2006)
  - Total: 12
- Time zone: UTC+3:30 (IRST)
  - Summer (DST): UTC+4:30 (IRDT)

Najafabad (Persian: نجف آباد, also Romanized as Najafābād) is a village in Baharestan Rural District, in the Central District of Nain County, Isfahan Province, Iran. At the 2006 census, its population was 12, in 5 families.
