= Fahiyeh =

Fahiyeh فهيه
- Village
- Location within Iran
- Coordinates: 32°41′08″N 52°56′57″E
- Country: Iran
- Province: Isfahan
- County: Nain
- Bakhsh: Central
- Rural District: Lay Siyah

Population (2006)
  - Total: 20
- Time zone: UTC+3:30 (IRST)
  - Summer (DST): UTC+4:30 (IRDT)

Fahiyeh (Persian: فهيه, also Romanized as Fahīyeh and Fahyeh; also known as Fīveh) is a village in Lay Siyah Rural District, in the Central District of Nain County, Isfahan Province, Iran. At the 2006 census, its population was 20, in 8 families.
