= Asfejan =

Asfejan اسفجان
- Village
- Location within Iran
- Coordinates: 32°50′38″N 52°46′23″E
- Country: Iran
- Province: Isfahan
- County: Nain
- Bakhsh: Central
- Rural District: Kuhestan

Population (2006)
  - Total: 14
- Time zone: UTC+3:30 (IRST)
  - Summer (DST): UTC+4:30 (IRDT)

Asfejan (Persian: اسفجان, also Romanized as Asfejān; also known as Asfenjān, Asfenjan, and Asfijān) is a village in Kuhestan Rural District, in the Central District of Nain County, Isfahan Province, Iran. At the 2006 census, its population was 14, in 6 families.
