= Rafiabad, Isfahan =

Rafiabad رفيع اباد
- Village
- Location within Iran
- Coordinates: 32°57′18″N 52°36′46″E
- Country: Iran
- Province: Isfahan
- County: Ardestan
- Bakhsh: Central
- Rural District: Barzavand

Population (2006)
  - Total: 18
- Time zone: UTC+3:30 (IRST)
  - Summer (DST): UTC+4:30 (IRDT)

Rafiabad (Persian: رفيع اباد, also Romanized as Rafī‘ābād) is a village in Barzavand Rural District, in the Central District of Ardestan County, Isfahan Province, Iran. At the 2006 census, its population was 18, in 4 families.
