= Mazikcheh =

Mazikcheh مزيكچه
- Village
- Location within Iran
- Coordinates: 32°52′17″N 52°47′01″E
- Country: Iran
- Province: Isfahan
- County: Nain
- Bakhsh: Central
- Rural District: Kuhestan

Population (2006)
  - Total: 19
- Time zone: UTC+3:30 (IRST)
  - Summer (DST): UTC+4:30 (IRDT)

Mazikcheh (Persian: مزيكچه, also Romanized as Mazīkcheh; also known as Mazīyeh Kacheh) is a village in Kuhestan Rural District, in the Central District of Nain County, Isfahan Province, Iran. At the 2006 census, its population was 19, in 8 families.
