= Zamanabad, Nain =

Zamanabad زمان اباد
- Village
- Location within Iran
- Coordinates: 32°43′02″N 52°53′48″E
- Country: Iran
- Province: Isfahan
- County: Nain
- Bakhsh: Central
- Rural District: Lay Siyah

Population (2006)
  - Total: 39
- Time zone: UTC+3:30 (IRST)
  - Summer (DST): UTC+4:30 (IRDT)

Zamanabad (Persian: زمان اباد, also Romanized as Zamānābād) is a village in Lay Siyah Rural District, in the Central District of Nain County, Isfahan Province, Iran. At the 2006 census, its population was 39, in 15 families.
