= Bidun, Iran =

Bidun بيدون
- Village
- Location within Iran
- Coordinates: 33°16′08″N 52°36′50″E
- Country: Iran
- Province: Isfahan
- County: Ardestan
- Bakhsh: Central
- Rural District: Kachu

Population (2006)
  - Total: 11
- Time zone: UTC+3:30 (IRST)
  - Summer (DST): UTC+4:30 (IRDT)

Bidun (Persian: بيدون, also Romanized as Bīdūn; also known as Dīdūn) is a village in Kachu Rural District, in the Central District of Ardestan County, Isfahan Province, Iran. At the 2006 census, its population was 11, in 4 families.
