= Musaabad, Nain =

Musaabad موسي اباد
- Village
- Location within Iran
- Coordinates: 32°40′52″N 52°51′04″E
- Country: Iran
- Province: Isfahan
- County: Nain
- Bakhsh: Central
- Rural District: Lay Siyah

Population (2006)
  - Total: 41
- Time zone: UTC+3:30 (IRST)
  - Summer (DST): UTC+4:30 (IRDT)

Musaabad (Persian: موسي اباد, also Romanized as Mūsáābād) is a village in Lay Siyah Rural District, in the Central District of Nain County, Isfahan Province, Iran. At the 2006 census, its population was 41, in 15 families.
