= Sergey Kovalev (historian) =

Soviet scholar of classical antiquity (1886–1960)

Sergey Ivanovich Kovalev (Russian: Сергей Иванович Ковалёв; 25 September [O.S. 13 September] 1886 – 12 November 1960) was a Soviet scholar of classical antiquity. He was interested particularly in the Hellenistic period, the origins of Christianity, Roman history and ancient historiography.

== Life ==
Kovalev was born in the village of Kuganak, then in Ufa Governorate of the Russian Empire.

Being a high school student Kovalev joined the Ufa organization of the RSDLP (b). He was engaged in circles, carrying out party assignments, printed and pasted proclamations. For participation in the May Day demonstration of 1905 he was arrested and expelled from the 8th grade of the gymnasium. At the end of May, he was sent under police supervision to his uncle in Samara. There he continued to work in the Samara organization of the RSDLP (b). Kovalev later mostly withdrew from political activity.

In 1910, he entered the History and Philology Department of the Saint Petersburg University, before being drafted into the military in 1915. In 1922, Kovalev graduated from the Department of Social Sciences of the Saint Petersburg University. He attained the professorship and became the Head of Department of the Ancient World in the Saint Petersburg University. He also worked in the Petersburg (then Leningrad) branch of the History Institute of the Soviet Academy of Sciences. In Greek history, Kovalev denied the concept of Dorian invasion. In 1930, Kovalev published an article on the formation of ancient Macedonian state under Philip and Alexander the Great. In 1936, Kovalev published the first comprehensive Soviet textbook on ancient history for high school. He became one of the editors of the three-volume Soviet book The History of Ancient World. There he authored two chapters, "The rise of Macedonia and the conquest of Asia" and "The philosophy and art of Greece during its heyday". In 1945–48, Kovalev published his seminal work, The History of Rome. In 1956–60, Kovalev was the director of the Museum of the History of Religion and Atheism.

=== Historicity of Jesus ===
In 1956–59, Kovalev polemicized with British scholar Archibald Robertson about the historicity of Jesus. The polemic was spurred by the Russian translation of Robertson's publication The Origins of Christianity. Kovalev, who held atheistic views, clung to the Christ myth theory. In the foreword for the Russian translation Kovalev called Robertson's recognition of Jesus' historicity "a serious flaw" and argued to the contrary. Robertson replied to Kovalev in the second edition of The Origins of Christianity. At the same time Kovalev acknowledged the historicity of John the Baptist, Paul the Apostle and apostle James.
