= Hamunabad =

Hamunabad هامون اباد
- Village
- Location within Iran
- Coordinates: 32°50′18″N 52°44′39″E
- Country: Iran
- Province: Isfahan
- County: Nain
- Bakhsh: Central
- Rural District: Kuhestan

Population (2006)
  - Total: 9
- Time zone: UTC+3:30 (IRST)
  - Summer (DST): UTC+4:30 (IRDT)

Hamunabad (Persian: هامون اباد, Romanized as Hāmūnābād) is a village in Kuhestan Rural District, Central District, Nain County, Isfahan Province, Iran. At the 2006 census, its population was 9, in 5 families.
