= Mandegi-ye Olya =

Mandegi-ye Olya ماندگي عليا
- Village
- Location within Iran
- Coordinates: 32°42′04″N 52°55′00″E
- Country: Iran
- Province: Isfahan
- County: Nain
- Bakhsh: Central
- Rural District: Lay Siyah

Population (2006)
  - Total: 28
- Time zone: UTC+3:30 (IRST)
  - Summer (DST): UTC+4:30 (IRDT)

Mandegi-ye Olya (Persian: ماندگي عليا, also Romanized as Māndegī-ye ‘Olyā; also known as Māndegī-ye Bālā and Māngī-ye Bālā) is a village in Lay Siyah Rural District, in the Central District of Nain County, Isfahan Province, Iran. At the 2006 census, its population was 28, in 9 families.
