= Ziaratgah, Ardestan =

Ziaratgah زيارتگاه
- Village
- Location within Iran
- Coordinates: 33°09′16″N 52°35′41″E
- Country: Iran
- Province: Isfahan
- County: Ardestan
- Bakhsh: Central
- Rural District: Kachu

Population (2006)
  - Total: 29
- Time zone: UTC+3:30 (IRST)
  - Summer (DST): UTC+4:30 (IRDT)

Ziaratgah (Persian: زيارتگاه, also Romanized as Zīāratgāh and Zeyāratgāh) is a village in Kachu Rural District, in the Central District of Ardestan County, Isfahan Province, Iran. At the 2006 census, its population was 29, in 8 families.
