= Dizicheh, Ardestan =

Dizicheh ديزيچه
- Village
- Location within Iran
- Coordinates: 32°55′48″N 52°36′17″E
- Country: Iran
- Province: Isfahan
- County: Ardestan
- Bakhsh: Central
- Rural District: Barzavand

Population (2006)
  - Total: 66
- Time zone: UTC+3:30 (IRST)
  - Summer (DST): UTC+4:30 (IRDT)

Dizicheh (Persian: ديزيچه, also Romanized as Dīzīcheh; also known as Dīzechī, Dīzehcheh, and Dīzejī) is a village in Barzavand Rural District, in the Central District of Ardestan County, Isfahan Province, Iran. At the 2006 census, its population was 66, in 20 families.
