= Padandestan =

Padandestan پدندستان
- Village
- Location within Iran
- Coordinates: 32°50′08″N 52°51′22″E
- Country: Iran
- Province: Isfahan
- County: Nain
- Bakhsh: Central
- Rural District: Kuhestan

Population (2006)
  - Total: 14
- Time zone: UTC+3:30 (IRST)
  - Summer (DST): UTC+4:30 (IRDT)

Padandestan (Persian: پدندستان, also Romanized as Padandestān, Padandastan, and Pedandestān; also known as Bulandistān, Pandandestān, and Pandestān) is a village in Kuhestan Rural District, in the Central District of Nain County, Isfahan Province, Iran. At the 2006 census, its population was 14, in 8 families.
