= Arjak =

Arjak ارجك
- Village
- Location within Iran
- Coordinates: 32°53′01″N 52°54′45″E
- Country: Iran
- Province: Isfahan
- County: Nain
- Bakhsh: Central
- Rural District: Kuhestan

Population (2006)
  - Total: 13
- Time zone: UTC+3:30 (IRST)
  - Summer (DST): UTC+4:30 (IRDT)

Arjak (Persian: ارجك, also Romanized as Erjak) is a village in Kuhestan Rural District, in the Central District of Nain County, Isfahan Province, Iran. At the 2006 census, its population was 13, in 6 families.
