= Rahmatabad, Zavareh =

Rahmatabad رحمت آباد
- Village
- Location within Iran
- Coordinates: 33°21′27″N 52°46′29″E
- Country: Iran
- Province: Isfahan
- County: Ardestan
- Bakhsh: Zavareh
- Rural District: Sofla

Population (2006)
  - Total: 10
- Time zone: UTC+3:30 (IRST)
  - Summer (DST): UTC+4:30 (IRDT)

Rahmatabad (Persian: رحمت آباد, also Romanized as Raḩmatābād) is a village in Sofla Rural District, Zavareh District, Ardestan County, Isfahan Province, Iran. At the 2006 census, its population was 10, in 5 families.
