= Chahar Mil =

Chahar Mil چهارميل
- Village
- Location within Iran
- Coordinates: 33°28′42″N 52°21′33″E
- Country: Iran
- Province: Isfahan
- County: Ardestan
- Bakhsh: Zavareh
- Rural District: Rigestan

Population (2006)
  - Total: 124
- Time zone: UTC+3:30 (IRST)
  - Summer (DST): UTC+4:30 (IRDT)

Chahar Mil (Persian: چهارميل, also Romanized as Chahār Mīl; also known as Chahār Mīl-e Ardestān, Chehāmīn, and Chehān) is a village in Rigestan Rural District, Zavareh District, Ardestan County, Isfahan Province, Iran. At the 2006 census, its population was 124, in 30 families.
