= Moinabad, Ardestan =

Moinabad معين اباد
- Village
- Location within Iran
- Coordinates: 33°33′49″N 52°27′53″E
- Country: Iran
- Province: Isfahan
- County: Ardestan
- Bakhsh: Zavareh
- Rural District: Rigestan

Population (2006)
  - Total: 90
- Time zone: UTC+3:30 (IRST)
  - Summer (DST): UTC+4:30 (IRDT)

Moinabad (Persian: معين اباد, also Romanized as Mo‘īnābād) is a village in Rigestan Rural District, Zavareh District, Ardestan County, Isfahan Province, Iran. According to a census recorded in 2006, its population is 90, in 26 families.
