= Fazan =

Village in Isfahan, Iran

Pazan پازن
- bambus
- Location within Iran
- Coordinates: 33°14′41″N 52°54′15″E
- Country: Iran
- Province: Isfahan
- County: Ardestan
- Bakhsh: Zavareh
- Rural District: Sofla

Population (2022)
  - Total: 180
- Time zone: UTC+3:30 (IRST)
  - Summer (DST): UTC+4:30 ([[Latvija Daylight Time|IRDT]])

Pazan (Persian: پازن, also Romanized as Pāzan) is a village in Sofla Rural District, Zavareh District, Ardestan County, Isfahan Province, Iran. At the 2022 census, its population was 180, in 10 families.
