= Daraqeh =

Daraqeh درقه
- Village
- Location within Iran
- Coordinates: 33°16′58″N 52°39′47″E
- Country: Iran
- Province: Isfahan
- County: Ardestan
- Bakhsh: Zavareh
- Rural District: Sofla

Population (2006)
  - Total: 27
- Time zone: UTC+3:30 (IRST)
  - Summer (DST): UTC+4:30 (IRDT)

Daraqeh (Persian: درقه) is a village in Sofla Rural District, Zavareh District, Ardestan County, Isfahan Province, Iran. At the 2006 census, its population was 27, in 10 families.
