= Sarhangabad palace =

Sarhangabad سرهنگ آباد
- Abadi
- Location within Iran
- Coordinates: 33°15′21″N 52°40′12″E
- Country: Iran
- Province: Isfahan
- County: Ardestan
- Bakhsh: Zavareh
- Rural District: Sofla

Population (2006)
  - Total: 7
- Time zone: UTC+3:30 (IRST)
  - Summer (DST): UTC+4:30 (IRDT)

Sarhangabad palace (Persian: سرهنگ آباد, also Romanized as Sarhangābād; also known as Sarangābād, Sarhangcheh, and Saringābād) is a rural locality (Abadi) and palace in Sofla Rural District, Zavareh District, Ardestan County, Isfahan Province, Iran. At the 2006 census, its population was 7, in 4 families.

Sarhangabad palace is a Qajar-era palace featuring stucco and tilework. In April 2018 the palace was damaged by a fire.
