= Aliabad, Rigestan =

Aliabad علی‌آباد
- Village
- Location within Iran
- Coordinates: 33°34′08″N 52°27′13″E
- Country: Iran
- Province: Isfahan
- County: Ardestan
- Bakhsh: Zavareh
- Rural District: Rigestan

Population (2006)
  - Total: 53
- Time zone: UTC+3:30 (IRST)
  - Summer (DST): UTC+4:30 (IRDT)

Aliabad (Persian: علی‌آباد, also Romanized as ‘Alīābād; also known as ‘Alīābād-e ‘Abd ol Karīm) is a village in Rigestan Rural District, Zavareh District, Ardestan County, Isfahan Province, Iran. At the 2006 census, its population was 53, in 13 families.
