= Bacheh =

Bacheh باچه
- Village
- Location within Iran
- Coordinates: 32°32′51″N 51°52′32″E
- Country: Iran
- Province: Isfahan
- County: Isfahan
- Bakhsh: Central
- Rural District: Baraan-e Shomali

Population (2006)
  - Total: 477
- Time zone: UTC+3:30 (IRST)
  - Summer (DST): UTC+4:30 (IRDT)

Bacheh (Persian: باچه, also Romanized as Bācheh; also known as Bārcheh) is a village in Baraan-e Shomali Rural District, in the Central District of Isfahan County, Isfahan Province, Iran. At the 2006 census, its population was 477, in 128 families.
