= Kotiabad =

Kotiabad كتي اباد
- Village
- Location within Iran
- Coordinates: 32°38′46″N 51°04′05″E
- Country: Iran
- Province: Isfahan
- County: Tiran and Karvan
- Bakhsh: Central
- Rural District: Rezvaniyeh

Population (2006)
  - Total: 13
- Time zone: UTC+3:30 (IRST)
  - Summer (DST): UTC+4:30 (IRDT)

Kotiabad (Persian: كتي اباد, also Romanized as Kotīābād; also known as Kalīābād) is a village in Rezvaniyeh Rural District, in the Central District of Tiran and Karvan County, Isfahan Province, Iran. At the 2006 census, its population was 13, in 6 families.
