= Qaleh-ye Sorkh, Falavarjan =

Qaleh-ye Sorkh قلعه سرخ
- Village
- Location within Iran
- Coordinates: 32°29′19″N 51°35′59″E
- Country: Iran
- Province: Isfahan
- County: Falavarjan
- Bakhsh: Pir Bakran
- Rural District: Garkan-e Shomali

Population (2006)
  - Total: 408
- Time zone: UTC+3:30 (IRST)
  - Summer (DST): UTC+4:30 (IRDT)

Qaleh-ye Sorkh (Persian: قلعه سرخ, also Romanized as Qal‘eh-ye Sorkh and Qal‘eh-e Sorkh) is a village in Garkan-e Shomali Rural District, Pir Bakran District, Falavarjan County, Isfahan Province, Iran. At the 2006 census, its population was 408, in 112 families.
