= Mirabad, Shahreza =

Mirabad ميراباد
- Village
- Location within Iran
- Coordinates: 31°48′27″N 52°00′54″E
- Country: Iran
- Province: Isfahan
- County: Shahreza
- Bakhsh: Central
- Rural District: Manzariyeh
- Established: 1900

Area
  - Total: 1 km^{2} (0.39 sq mi)

Population (2006)
  - Total: 159
  - Density: 160/km^{2} (410/sq mi)
- Time zone: UTC+3:30 (IRST)
  - Summer (DST): UTC+4:30 (IRDT)

Mirabad (Persian: ميراباد, also Romanized as Mīrābād) is a village in Manzariyeh Rural District, in the Central District of Shahreza County, Isfahan Province, Iran. At the 2006 census, its population was 159, in 54 families The above village is one of the functions of Shahreza city and operates under the supervision of Shahreza center district. This village is located between the two lanes of Shahreza-Abadeh road, so that you can enter the village from both sides of the road. This village has an aqueduct whose gardens and agricultural lands are irrigated with the help of this aqueduct. Fruits and products of this village: grapes, almonds, apricots, cherries, pomegranates, wheat, barley, alfalfa, lettuce. Tomatoes are cucumbers and .... The water of the aqueduct of this village is directed to the village with the help of underground canals. .
