= Makuleh =

Makuleh ماكوله
- Village
- Location within Iran
- Coordinates: 33°23′45″N 50°12′52″E
- Country: Iran
- Province: Isfahan
- County: Golpayegan
- Bakhsh: Central
- Rural District: Kenarrudkhaneh

Population (2006)
  - Total: 88
- Time zone: UTC+3:30 (IRST)
  - Summer (DST): UTC+4:30 (IRDT)

Makuleh (Persian: ماكوله, also Romanized as Mākūleh and Makooleh) is a village in Kenarrudkhaneh Rural District, in the Central District of Golpayegan County, Isfahan Province, Iran. At the 2006 census, its population was 88, in 26 families.
