= Namzad =

Namzad نامزاد
- Village
- Location within Iran
- Coordinates: 32°33′41″N 51°53′12″E
- Country: Iran
- Province: Isfahan
- County: Isfahan
- Bakhsh: Central
- Rural District: Baraan-e Shomali

Population (2006)
  - Total: 85
- Time zone: UTC+3:30 (IRST)
  - Summer (DST): UTC+4:30 (IRDT)

Namzad (Persian: نامزاد, also Romanized as Nāmzād; also known as Nānzā) is a village in Baraan-e Shomali Rural District, in the Central District of Isfahan County, Isfahan Province, Iran. At the 2006 census, its population was 85, in 24 families.
