= Masineh =

Masineh مسينه
- Village
- Location within Iran
- Coordinates: 31°51′28″N 51°56′09″E
- Country: Iran
- Province: Isfahan
- County: Shahreza
- Bakhsh: Central
- Rural District: Manzariyeh

Population (2006)
  - Total: 192
- Time zone: UTC+3:30 (IRST)
  - Summer (DST): UTC+4:30 (IRDT)

Masineh (Persian: مسينه, also Romanized as Masīneh and Mesīneh; also known as Masin and Māsīnī) is a village in Manzariyeh Rural District, in the Central District of Shahreza County, Isfahan Province, Iran. At the 2006 census, its population was 192, in 55 families.
