= Lagaleh =

Lagaleh لگاله
- Village
- Location within Iran
- Coordinates: 32°37′58″N 50°23′17″E
- Country: Iran
- Province: Isfahan
- County: Chadegan
- Bakhsh: Chenarud
- Rural District: Chenarud-e Shomali

Population (2006)
  - Total: 123
- Time zone: UTC+3:30 (IRST)
  - Summer (DST): UTC+4:30 (IRDT)

Lagaleh (Persian: لگاله, also Romanized as Lagāleh and Legāleh; also known as Lekāleh) is a village in Chenarud-e Shomali Rural District, Chenarud District, Chadegan County, Isfahan Province, Iran. At the 2006 census, its population was 123, in 32 families.
