= Shurghestan =

Shurghestan شورغستان
- Village
- Location within Iran
- Coordinates: 33°16′38″N 52°05′10″E
- Country: Iran
- Province: Isfahan
- County: Natanz
- Bakhsh: Central
- Rural District: Karkas

Population (2006)
  - Total: 15
- Time zone: UTC+3:30 (IRST)
  - Summer (DST): UTC+4:30 (IRDT)

Shurghestan (Persian: شورغستان, also Romanized as Shūrghestān and Shūreghestān; also known as Shūreqestān and Shūrgistān) is a village in Karkas Rural District, in the Central District of Natanz County, Isfahan Province, Iran. At the 2006 census, its population was 15, in 4 families.
