= Surabad, Isfahan =

Surabad صوراباد
- Village
- Location within Iran
- Coordinates: 33°59′48″N 51°11′08″E
- Country: Iran
- Province: Isfahan
- County: Kashan
- Bakhsh: Neyasar
- Rural District: Neyasar

Population (2006)
  - Total: 28
- Time zone: UTC+3:30 (IRST)
  - Summer (DST): UTC+4:30 (IRDT)

Surabad (Persian: صوراباد, also Romanized as Şūrābād and Sūrābād) is a village in Neyasar Rural District, Neyasar District, Kashan County, Isfahan Province, Iran. At the 2006 census, its population was 28, in 8 families.
