= Gharqab, Isfahan =

Ghargab غرقاب
- Village
- Location within Iran
- Coordinates: 33°34′09″N 50°19′39″E
- Country: Iran
- Province: Isfahan
- County: Golpayegan
- Bakhsh: Central
- Rural District: Kenarrudkhaneh

Population (2006)
  - Total: 50
- Time zone: UTC+3:30 (IRST)
  - Summer (DST): UTC+4:30 (IRDT)

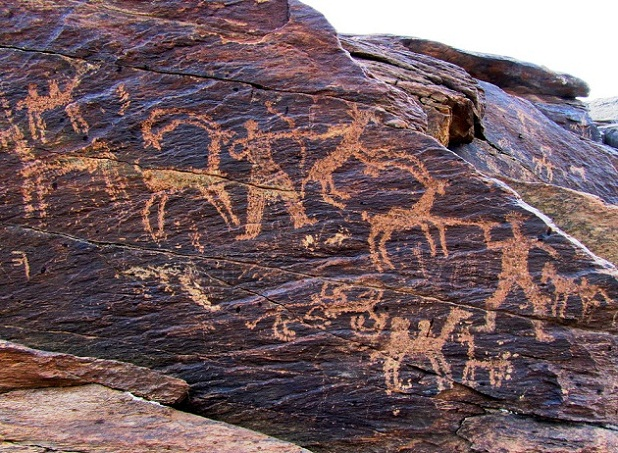
Golpayegan rockart

Gharqab (Persian: غرقاب, also Romanized as Gharqāb and Gharqeb; also known as Gharghab and Qarqāb) is a village in Kenarrudkhaneh Rural District, in the Central District of Golpayegan County, Isfahan Province, Iran. At the 2006 census, its population was 50, in 20 families.
