= Zanjanbar =

Zanjanbar زنجان بر
- Village
- Location within Iran
- Coordinates: 33°42′54″N 51°33′14″E
- Country: Iran
- Province: Isfahan
- County: Kashan
- Bakhsh: Central
- Rural District: Khorram Dasht

Population (2006)
  - Total: 28
- Time zone: UTC+3:30 (IRST)
  - Summer (DST): UTC+4:30 (IRDT)

Zanjanbar (Persian: زنجان بر, also Romanized as Zanjānbar and Zanjānebar; also known as Jehaq-e Pā’īn) is a village in Khorram Dasht Rural District, in the Central District of Kashan County, Isfahan Province, Iran. At the 2006 census, its population was 28, in 20 families.
