= Now Dar Amad =

Now Dar Amad نودرامد
- Village
- Location within Iran
- Coordinates: 32°27′31″N 51°35′27″E
- Country: Iran
- Province: Isfahan
- County: Falavarjan
- Bakhsh: Pir Bakran
- Rural District: Garkan-e Shomali

Population (2006)
  - Total: 643
- Time zone: UTC+3:30 (IRST)
  - Summer (DST): UTC+4:30 (IRDT)

Now Dar Amad (Persian: نودرامد, also Romanized as Now Dar Āmad and Now Darāmad) is a village in Garkan-e Shomali Rural District, Pir Bakran District, Falavarjan County, Isfahan Province, Iran. At the 2006 census, its population was 643, in 153 families.
