= Bagh-e Sorkh =

Bagh-e Sorkh باغ سرخ
- Village
- Location within Iran
- Coordinates: 31°48′18″N 52°00′07″E
- Country: Iran
- Province: Isfahan
- County: Shahreza
- Bakhsh: Central
- Rural District: Manzariyeh

Population (2006)
  - Total: 265
- Time zone: UTC+3:30 (IRST)
  - Summer (DST): UTC+4:30 (IRDT)

Bagh-e Sorkh (Persian: باغ سرخ, also Romanized as Bāgh-e Sorkh and Bāghsorkh; also known as Bāgh-i-Surkh) is a village in Manzariyeh Rural District, in the Central District of Shahreza County, Isfahan Province, Iran. At the 2006 census, its population was 265, in 43 families.
