= Sadat, Isfahan =

Sadat سادات
- Village
- Country: Iran
- Province: Isfahan
- County: Kashan
- Bakhsh: Central
- Rural District: Khorram Dasht

Population (2006)
  - Total: 19
- Time zone: UTC+3:30 (IRST)
  - Summer (DST): UTC+4:30 (IRDT)

Sadat (Persian: سادات, also Romanized as Sādāt) is a village in Khorram Dasht Rural District, in the Central District of Kashan County, Isfahan Province, Iran. At the 2006 census, its population was 19, in 5 families.
