= Karkhaneh-ye Derin =

Karkhaneh-ye Derin كارخانه درين
- Village
- Country: Iran
- Province: Isfahan
- County: Kashan
- Bakhsh: Central
- Rural District: Kuhpayeh

Population (2006)
  - Total: 36
- Time zone: UTC+3:30 (IRST)
  - Summer (DST): UTC+4:30 (IRDT)

Karkhaneh-ye Derin (Persian: كارخانه درين, also Romanized as Kārkhāneh-ye Derīn) is a village in Kuhpayeh Rural District, in the Central District of Kashan County, Isfahan Province, Iran. At the 2006 census, its population was 36, in 9 families.
