= Tajabad, Natanz =

Tajabad تاج اباد
- Village
- Location within Iran
- Coordinates: 33°22′48″N 51°58′48″E
- Country: Iran
- Province: Isfahan
- County: Natanz
- Bakhsh: Central
- Rural District: Karkas

Population (2006)
  - Total: 20
- Time zone: UTC+3:30 (IRST)
  - Summer (DST): UTC+4:30 (IRDT)

Tajabad (Persian: تاج اباد, also Romanized as Tājābād) is a village in Karkas Rural District, in the Central District of Natanz County, Isfahan Province, Iran. At the 2006 census, its population was 20, in 5 families.
