= Natanz Steel Plant =

Steel mill in Iran

Natanz Steel Plant (Persian: مجتمع کارخانه هاي فولاد نطنز – Mojtame`-ye Kārkhāneh Hāy Fūlād-e Naţanz) is a steel plant in Karkas Rural District, in the Central District of Natanz County, Isfahan Province, Iran. It was started in 1994 and began production in 2002.

== Steelworkers strikes ==
Steelworkers in Natanz held several protests inside the company in 2018 after they did not receive 10 months of salary before the Iranian New Year in March 2018. This resulted in steelworkers gathering at the factory ground and holding a demonstration. The governor of Natanz, Yusef Baferani held mediation between steelworkers and NSC. In 2018 the steelworkers' insurance was cut after payments from NSC to the insurance provider was halted. This issue received local coverage, with the Isfahan Municipality, the governor of Natanz and the parliamentary representative of Natanz expressing public sympathy for steelworkers.

== Debt scandal ==
In 2019 Tejarat Bank publicized a debt report in which it released the names its debtors, among which several steel companies stood out. In this report, the person of Javad Tavakoli holds first place on the list with an outstanding debt of 18.07 trillion rials, or 150 million dollars. The Mobarakeh Steel Company also held debts to Tejarat Bank. MSC debts stood at 6.3 million dollars in pure debt and 17.8 million dollars in non-pure/mutual debts at a total of 24.1 million dollars.
