= Shojaabad, Kashan =

Shojaabad شجاع‌آباد
- Village
- Location within Iran
- Coordinates: 33°46′07″N 51°42′42″E
- Country: Iran
- Province: Isfahan
- County: Kashan
- Bakhsh: Central
- Rural District: Khorram Dasht

Population (2006)
  - Total: 68
- Time zone: UTC+3:30 (IRST)
  - Summer (DST): UTC+4:30 (IRDT)

Shojaabad (Persian: شجاع‌آباد, also Romanized as Shojā‘ābād; also known as Shuja‘ābād) is a village in Khorram Dasht Rural District, in the Central District of Kashan County, Isfahan Province, Iran. At the 2006 census, its population was 68, in 25 families.
