= Yarand =

Yarand يارند
- Village
- Location within Iran
- Coordinates: 33°35′32″N 51°41′00″E
- Country: Iran
- Province: Isfahan
- County: Natanz
- Bakhsh: Central
- Rural District: Barzrud

Population (2006)
  - Total: 130
- Time zone: UTC+3:30 (IRST)
  - Summer (DST): UTC+4:30 (IRDT)

Yarand (Persian: يارند, also Romanized as Yārand) is a village in Barzrud Rural District, in the Central District of Natanz County, Isfahan Province, Iran. At the time of the 2006 census, its population was 130, in 52 families.
