= Qaleh-ye Arab =

Qaleh-ye Arab قلعه عرب
- Village
- Location within Iran
- Coordinates: 32°37′22″N 50°58′52″E
- Country: Iran
- Province: Isfahan
- County: Tiran and Karvan
- Bakhsh: Central
- Rural District: Rezvaniyeh

Population (2006)
  - Total: 25
- Time zone: UTC+3:30 (IRST)
  - Summer (DST): UTC+4:30 (IRDT)

Qaleh-ye Arab (Persian: قلعه عرب, also Romanized as Qal‘eh-ye ‘Arab and Qal‘eh ‘Arab) is a village in Rezvaniyeh Rural District, in the Central District of Tiran and Karvan County, Isfahan Province, Iran. At the 2006 census, its population was 25, in 12 families.
