= Salkh-e Now =

Salkh-e Now سلخنو
- Village
- Location within Iran
- Coordinates: 33°58′48″N 51°10′04″E
- Country: Iran
- Province: Isfahan
- County: Kashan
- Bakhsh: Neyasar
- Rural District: Neyasar

Population (2006)
  - Total: 36
- Time zone: UTC+3:30 (IRST)
  - Summer (DST): UTC+4:30 (IRDT)

Salkh-e Now (Persian: سلخنو) is a village in Neyasar Rural District, Neyasar District, Kashan County, Isfahan Province, Iran. At the 2006 census, its population was 36, in 11 families.
