= Rekabdar =

Rekabdar ركابدار
- Village
- Location within Iran
- Coordinates: 33°25′59″N 50°13′53″E
- Country: Iran
- Province: Isfahan
- County: Golpayegan
- Bakhsh: Central
- Rural District: Kenarrudkhaneh

Population (2006)
  - Total: 306
- Time zone: UTC+3:30 (IRST)
  - Summer (DST): UTC+4:30 (IRDT)

Rekabdar (Persian: ركابدار, also Romanized as Rekābdār) is a village in Kenarrudkhaneh Rural District, in the Central District of Golpayegan County, Isfahan Province, Iran. At the 2006 census, its population was 306, in 95 families.
