= Parzegan-e Sofla =

Parzegan-e Sofla پرزگان سفلي
- Village
- Location within Iran
- Coordinates: 32°41′45″N 50°20′41″E
- Country: Iran
- Province: Isfahan
- County: Chadegan
- Bakhsh: Chenarud
- Rural District: Chenarud-e Shomali

Population (2006)
  - Total: 187
- Time zone: UTC+3:30 (IRST)
  - Summer (DST): UTC+4:30 (IRDT)

Parzegan-e Sofla (Persian: پرزگان سفلي, also Romanized as Parzegān-e Soflá) is a village in Chenarud-e Shomali Rural District, Chenarud District, Chadegan County, Isfahan Province, Iran. At the 2006 census, its population was 187, in 45 families.
