= Maqsud Beyk =

Maqsud Beyk مقصودبيك
- Village
- Location within Iran
- Coordinates: 31°49′17″N 51°59′54″E
- Country: Iran
- Province: Isfahan
- County: Shahreza
- Bakhsh: Central
- Rural District: Manzariyeh

Population (2006)
  - Total: 139
- Time zone: UTC+3:30 (IRST)
  - Summer (DST): UTC+4:30 (IRDT)

Maqsud Beyk (Persian: مقصودبيك, also Romanized as Maqşūd Beyk; also known as Magşūd Beyk and Maqsūd Begi) is a village in Manzariyeh Rural District, in the Central District of Shahreza County, Isfahan Province, Iran. At the 2006 census, its population was 139, in 46 families.
