= Qand-e Nur-e Sepahan =

Village in Isfahan province, Iran

Qand-e Nur-e Sepahan Persian: قندنورسپاهان
- Village
- Location within Iran
- Country: Iran
- Province: Isfahan
- County: Shahinshahr
- District: Central
- Rural District: Borkhar-e Gharbi

Population (2016)
  - Total: Below reporting threshold
- Time zone: UTC+3:30 (IRST)

Qand-e Nur-e Sepahan (Persian: قندنورسپاهان) (Note: Also romanized as Qand-e Nūr-e Sepāhān) is a village in Borkhar-e Gharbi Rural District of the Central District in Shahinshahr County, (Note: Formerly Borkhar and Meymeh County and then renamed Shahinshahr and Meymeh County) Isfahan province, Iran.

== Demographics ==
=== Population ===
At the time of the 2006 National Census, the village's population was 20 in six households. The following censuses in 2011 and 2016 counted a population below the reporting threshold.
