= Tajareh, Neyasar =

Tajareh تجره
- Village
- Location within Iran
- Coordinates: 33°59′51″N 51°10′34″E
- Country: Iran
- Province: Isfahan
- County: Kashan
- Bakhsh: Neyasar
- Rural District: Neyasar

Population (2006)
  - Total: 36
- Time zone: UTC+3:30 (IRST)
  - Summer (DST): UTC+4:30 (IRDT)

Tajareh (Persian: تجره) is a village in Neyasar Rural District, Neyasar District, Kashan County, Isfahan Province, Iran. At the 2006 census, its population was 36, in 13 families.
