= Vazirabad, Isfahan =

Vazirabad وزيراباد
- Village
- Location within Iran
- Coordinates: 32°28′24″N 51°37′28″E
- Country: Iran
- Province: Isfahan
- County: Falavarjan
- Bakhsh: Pir Bakran
- Rural District: Garkan-e Shomali

Population (2006)
  - Total: 201
- Time zone: UTC+3:30 (IRST)
  - Summer (DST): UTC+4:30 (IRDT)

Vazirabad (Persian: وزيراباد, also romanized as Vazīrābād; also known as Yazdābād and Yezdābād) is a village in Garkan-e Shomali Rural District, Pir Bakran District, Falavarjan County, Isfahan Province, Iran. At the 2006 census its population was 201, in 65 families.
