= Valujerd =

Valujerd ولوگرد
- Village
- Location within Iran
- Coordinates: 33°34′54″N 51°44′46″E
- Country: Iran
- Province: Isfahan
- County: Natanz
- Bakhsh: Central
- Rural District: Barzrud

Population (2006)
  - Total: 153
- Time zone: UTC+3:30 (IRST)
  - Summer (DST): UTC+4:30 (IRDT)

Valujerd (Persian: ولوگرد, also Romanized as Valūjerd; also known as Valūgerd, Volūgerd, and Warūjird) is a village in Barzrud Rural District, in the Central District of Natanz County, Isfahan Province, Iran. At the 2006 census, its population was 153, in 86 families.
