= Amadegah Shahid Mohammad Montazeri =

Amadegah Shahid Mohammad Montazeri آمادگاه شهيدمحمدمنتظری
- Village
- Country: Iran
- Province: Isfahan
- County: Shahreza
- Bakhsh: Central
- Rural District: Manzariyeh

Population (2006)
  - Total: 34
- Time zone: UTC+3:30 (IRST)
  - Summer (DST): UTC+4:30 (IRDT)

Amadegah Shahid Mohammad Montazeri (Persian: آمادگاه شهيدمحمدمنتظری, also Romanized as Āmādegāh Shahīd Moḩammad Montaz̧eri) is a village in Manzariyeh Rural District, in the Central District of Shahreza County, Isfahan Province, Iran. At the 2006 census, its population was 34, in 10 families.
