= Sar Cheshmeh-ye Kuganak =

Sar Cheshmeh-ye Kuganak سرچشمه كوگانك
- Village
- Location within Iran
- Coordinates: 32°33′27″N 50°18′44″E
- Country: Iran
- Province: Isfahan
- County: Chadegan
- Bakhsh: Chenarud
- Rural District: Chenarud-e Jonubi

Population (2006)
  - Total: 126
- Time zone: UTC+3:30 (IRST)
  - Summer (DST): UTC+4:30 (IRDT)

Sar Cheshmeh-ye Kuganak (Persian: سرچشمه كوگانك, also Romanized as Sar Cheshmeh-ye Kūgānak; also known as Sar Cheshmeh) is a village in Chenarud-e Jonubi Rural District, Chenarud District, Chadegan County, Isfahan Province, Iran. At the 2006 census, its population was 126, with 21 families.
