= Margh, Golpayegan =

Margh مرغ
- Village
- Location within Iran
- Coordinates: 33°35′08″N 50°14′18″E
- Country: Iran
- Province: Isfahan
- County: Golpayegan
- Bakhsh: Central
- Rural District: Kenarrudkhaneh

Population (2006)
  - Total: 51
- Time zone: UTC+3:30 (IRST)
  - Summer (DST): UTC+4:30 (IRDT)

Margh (Persian: مرغ, also Romanized as Morgh; also known as Marq) is a village in Kenarrudkhaneh Rural District, in the Central District of Golpayegan County, Isfahan Province, Iran. At the 2006 census, its population was 51, in 17 families.
