= Mohammadiyeh, Shahreza =

Mohammadiyeh محمديه
- Village
- Location within Iran
- Coordinates: 31°55′16″N 51°50′16″E
- Country: Iran
- Province: Isfahan
- County: Shahreza
- Bakhsh: Central
- Rural District: Manzariyeh

Population (2006)
  - Total: 34
- Time zone: UTC+3:30 (IRST)
  - Summer (DST): UTC+4:30 (IRDT)

Mohammadiyeh (Persian: محمديه, also Romanized as Moḩammadīyeh; also known as Moḩammadī and Muhammadi) is a village in Manzariyeh Rural District, in the Central District of Shahreza County, Isfahan Province, Iran. At the 2006 census, its population was 34, in 10 families.
