= Kucheri =

Kucheri كوچري
- Village
- Location within Iran
- Coordinates: 33°25′33″N 50°10′18″E
- Country: Iran
- Province: Isfahan
- County: Golpayegan
- Bakhsh: Central
- Rural District: Kenarrudkhaneh

Population (2006)
  - Total: 317
- Time zone: UTC+3:30 (IRST)
  - Summer (DST): UTC+4:30 (IRDT)

Kucheri (Persian: كوچري, also Romanized as Kūcherī, Koochari, and Kūcharī; also known as Kocherī) is a village in Kenarrudkhaneh Rural District, in the Central District of Golpayegan County, Isfahan Province, Iran. At the 2006 census, its population was 317, in 124 families.
