= Mahdiyeh, Chadegan =

Mahdiyeh مهديه
- Village
- Country: Iran
- Province: Isfahan
- County: Chadegan
- Bakhsh: Chenarud
- Rural District: Chenarud-e Shomali

Population (2006)
  - Total: 81
- Time zone: UTC+3:30 (IRST)
  - Summer (DST): UTC+4:30 (IRDT)

Mahdiyeh (Persian: مهديه, also Romanized as Mahdīyeh) is a village in Chenarud-e Shomali Rural District, Chenarud District, Chadegan County, Isfahan Province, Iran. At the 2006 census, its population was 81, in 16 families.
