= Darreh-ye Alucheh =

Darreh-ye Alucheh دره آلوچه
- Village
- Location within Iran
- Coordinates: 32°36′28″N 50°16′49″E
- Country: Iran
- Province: Isfahan
- County: Chadegan
- Bakhsh: Chenarud
- Rural District: Chenarud-e Jonubi

Population (2006)
  - Total: 37
- Time zone: UTC+3:30 (IRST)
  - Summer (DST): UTC+4:30 (IRDT)

Darreh-ye Alucheh (Persian: دره آلوچه, also Romanized as Darreh-ye Ālūcheh; also known as Darreh Ālīcheh) is a village in Chenarud-e Jonubi Rural District, Chenarud District, Chadegan County, Isfahan Province, Iran. At the 2006 census, its population was 37, in 7 families.
