= Esfajerd =

Village in Isfahan Province, Iran

Esfajerd اسفاجرد
- village
- Location within Iran
- Coordinates: 33°33′43″N 50°20′51″E
- Country: Iran
- Provinces of Iran: Province
- County: Golpayegan
- Bakhsh: Central
- Rural District: Kenarrudkhaneh

Population (2006)
  - Total: 233
- Time zone: UTC+3:30 (IRST)
  - Summer (DST): UTC+4:30 (IRDT)

Esfajerd (Persian: اسفاجرد, also Romanized as Esfājerd; also known as Isfajird and Safājerd) is a village in Kenarrudkhaneh Rural District, in the Central District of Golpayegan County, Isfahan Province, Iran. At the 2006 census, 8 families.
