= Agarijeh =

Agarijeh اگريجه
- Village
- Location within Iran
- Coordinates: 32°35′55″N 50°24′10″E
- Country: Iran
- Province: Isfahan
- County: Chadegan
- Bakhsh: Chenarud
- Rural District: Chenarud-e Jonubi

Population (2006)
  - Total: 34
- Time zone: UTC+3:30 (IRST)
  - Summer (DST): UTC+4:30 (IRDT)

Agarijeh (Persian: اگريجه, also Romanized as Agarījeh; also known as Agarjeh, Akarcheh, and Akrīcheh) is a village in Chenarud-e Jonubi Rural District, Chenarud District, Chadegan County, Isfahan Province, Iran. At the 2006 census, its population was 34, in 9 families.
