= Abyazan =

Abyazan ابيازن
- Village
- Location within Iran
- Coordinates: 33°24′54″N 51°59′59″E
- Country: Iran
- Province: Isfahan
- County: Natanz
- Bakhsh: Central
- Rural District: Karkas

Population (2006)
  - Total: 94
- Time zone: UTC+3:30 (IRST)
  - Summer (DST): UTC+4:30 (IRDT)

Abyazan (Persian: ابيازن, also Romanized as Abyāzan and Abīāzān; also known as Āb-e Azān and Āb-i-Azān) is a village in Karkas Rural District, in the Central District of Natanz County, Isfahan Province, Iran. At the 2006 census, its population was 94, in 36 families.
