= Taqiabad, Chadegan =

Taqiabad تقی‌آباد
- Village
- Location within Iran
- Coordinates: 32°44′47″N 50°20′02″E
- Country: Iran
- Province: Isfahan
- County: Chadegan
- Bakhsh: Chenarud
- Rural District: Chenarud-e Shomali

Population (2006)
  - Total: 26
- Time zone: UTC+3:30 (IRST)
  - Summer (DST): UTC+4:30 (IRDT)

Taqiabad (Persian: تقی‌آباد, also Romanized as Taqīābād) is a village in Chenarud-e Shomali Rural District, Chenarud District, Chadegan County, Isfahan Province, Iran. At the 2006 census, its population was 26, in 5 families.
