= Sibeh =

Village in Isfahan province, Iran

Sibeh Persian: سيبه
- Village
- Location within Iran
- Coordinates: 32°16′51″N 51°18′52″E
- Country: Iran
- Province: Isfahan
- County: Lenjan
- District: Central
- Rural District: Kariz

Population (2016)
  - Total: 95
- Time zone: UTC+3:30 (IRST)

Sibeh (Persian: سيبه) (Note: Also romanized as Sībeh) is a village in Kariz Rural District of the Central District in Lenjan County, Isfahan province, Iran.

== Demographics ==
=== Population ===
At the time of the 2006 National Census, the village's population was 112 in 29 households, when it was in Ashiyan Rural District. (Note: Renamed Ashiyan-e Shomali Rural District) The following census in 2011 counted 105 people in 30 households. The 2016 census measured the population of the village as 95 people in 29 households.

In 2012, the rural district was transferred to the new Fuladshahr District and renamed Ashiyan-e Shomali Rural District. Sibeh was transferred to Kariz Rural District created in the Central District.
