= Barownaq =

Barownaq بارونق
- Village
- Location within Iran
- Coordinates: 33°59′28″N 51°14′23″E
- Country: Iran
- Province: Isfahan
- County: Kashan
- Bakhsh: Central
- Rural District: Kuhpayeh

Population (2006)
  - Total: 60
- Time zone: UTC+3:30 (IRST)
  - Summer (DST): UTC+4:30 (IRDT)

Barownaq (Persian: بارونق, also Romanized as Bārownaq) is a village in Kuhpayeh Rural District, in the Central District of Kashan County, Isfahan Province, Iran. At the 2006 census, its population was 60, in 23 families.
