= Shurab, Isfahan =

Shurab شوراب
- Village
- Location within Iran
- Coordinates: 33°44′55″N 51°46′06″E
- Country: Iran
- Province: Isfahan
- County: Kashan
- Bakhsh: Central
- Rural District: Khorram Dasht

Population (2006)
  - Total: 14
- Time zone: UTC+3:30 (IRST)
  - Summer (DST): UTC+4:30 (IRDT)

Shurab (Persian: شوراب, also Romanized as Shūrāb) is a village in Khorram Dasht Rural District, in the Central District of Kashan County, Isfahan Province, Iran. At the 2006 census, its population was 14, in 6 families.
