= Kahriz-e Lotfi =

Kahriz-e Lotfi كهريزلطفي
- Village
- Location within Iran
- Coordinates: 32°32′37″N 51°06′16″E
- Country: Iran
- Province: Isfahan
- County: Tiran and Karvan
- Bakhsh: Central
- Rural District: Rezvaniyeh

Population (2006)
  - Total: 36
- Time zone: UTC+3:30 (IRST)
  - Summer (DST): UTC+4:30 (IRDT)

Kahriz-e Lotfi (Persian: كهريزلطفي, also Romanized as Kahrīz-e Loţfī; also known as Loţfī and Lutfi) is a village in Rezvaniyeh Rural District, in the Central District of Tiran and Karvan County, Isfahan Province, Iran. At the 2006 census, its population was 36, in 12 families.
