= Horestaneh-ye Olya =

Horestaneh-ye Olya هرستانه عليا
- Village
- Location within Iran
- Coordinates: 33°26′30″N 50°00′56″E
- Country: Iran
- Province: Isfahan
- County: Golpayegan
- Bakhsh: Central
- Rural District: Kenarrudkhaneh

Population (2006)
  - Total: 81
- Time zone: UTC+3:30 (IRST)
  - Summer (DST): UTC+4:30 (IRDT)

Horestaneh-ye Olya (Persian: هرستانه عليا, also Romanized as Horestāneh-ye ‘Olyā and Harestaneh Olya; also known as Horestāneh Bālā, Horestāneh-ye Bālā, Horistāneh, and Howrestāneh-ye Bālā) is a village in Kenarrudkhaneh Rural District, in the Central District of Golpayegan County, Isfahan Province, Iran. At the 2006 census, its population was 81, in 23 families.
