= Vanak-e Sofla =

Vanak-e Sofla ونك سفلي
- Village
- Location within Iran
- Coordinates: 32°38′50″N 50°24′49″E
- Country: Iran
- Province: Isfahan
- County: Chadegan
- Bakhsh: Chenarud
- Rural District: Chenarud-e Shomali

Population (2006)
  - Total: 105
- Time zone: UTC+3:30 (IRST)
  - Summer (DST): UTC+4:30 (IRDT)

Vanak-e Sofla (Persian: ونك سفلي, also Romanized as Vanak-e Soflá; also known as Vanak-e Pā’īn) is a village in Chenarud-e Shomali Rural District, Chenarud District, Chadegan County, Isfahan Province, Iran. At the 2006 census, its population was 105, in 23 families.
