= Vanak-e Olya =

Vanak-e Olya ونك عليا
- Village
- Location within Iran
- Coordinates: 32°39′48″N 50°23′07″E
- Country: Iran
- Province: Isfahan
- County: Chadegan
- Bakhsh: Chenarud
- Rural District: Chenarud-e Shomali

Population (2006)
  - Total: 63
- Time zone: UTC+3:30 (IRST)
  - Summer (DST): UTC+4:30 (IRDT)

Vanak-e Olya (Persian: ونك عليا, also Romanized as Vanak-e ‘Olyā; also known as Vanak-e Bālā) is a village in Chenarud-e Shomali Rural District, Chenarud District, Chadegan County, Isfahan Province, Iran. At the 2006 census, its population was 63, in 13 families.
