= Kuganak =

Kuganak كوگانك
- Village
- Location within Iran
- Coordinates: 32°33′04″N 50°20′11″E
- Country: Iran
- Province: Isfahan
- County: Chadegan
- Bakhsh: Chenarud
- Rural District: Chenarud-e Jonubi

Population (2006)
  - Total: 25
- Time zone: UTC+3:30 (IRST)
  - Summer (DST): UTC+4:30 (IRDT)

Kuganak (Persian: كوگانك, also Romanized as Kūgānak, Kowgānak, and Kowgonak; also known as Darreh-ye Gūgānak, Darreh-ye Kowgānak, Gūgānak-e ‘Olyā, Kaugunak, Kogānak, Kowkānak, and Kowkūnak) is a village in Chenarud-e Jonubi Rural District, Chenarud District, Chadegan County, Isfahan Province, Iran. At the 2006 census, its population was 25, in 5 families.
