= Central District (Ardestan County) =

District in Isfahan province, Iran

Central District (Ardestan County) Persian: بخش مرکزی شهرستان اردستان
- District
- Location within Iran
- Coordinates: 33°09′N 52°30′E
- Country: Iran
- Province: Isfahan
- County: Ardestan
- Capital: Ardestan

Population (2016)
  - Total: 29,427
- Time zone: UTC+3:30 (IRST)

The Central District of Ardestan County (Persian: بخش مرکزی شهرستان اردستان) is in Isfahan province, Iran. Its capital is the city of Ardestan.

== History ==
In 2019, Garmsir and Hombarat Rural Districts, and the city of Mahabad, were separated from the district in the formation of Mahabad District.

== Demographics ==
=== Population ===
At the time of the 2006 National Census, the district's population was 30,838 in 8,958 households. The following census in 2011 counted 29,011 people in 9,169 households. The 2016 census counted the population of the district as 29,427 inhabitants in 9,960 households.

=== Administrative divisions ===
Central District (Ardestan County) Population
Administrative Divisions	2006	2011	2016
Barzavand RD	3,943	2,937	2,972
Garmsir RD (Note: Transferred to Mahabad District after the 2016 census)	3,781	3,388	3,218
Hombarat RD	728	554	830
Kachu RD	1,771	1,295	1,483
Olya RD	1,836	1,480	1,453
Ardestan (city)	14,698	15,701	15,744
Mahabad (city)	4,081	3,656	3,727
Total	30,838	29,011	29,427
RD = Rural District
