= Ardestan County =

County in Isfahan province, Iran

Ardestan County Persian: شهرستان اردستان
- County
- Location of Ardestan County in Isfahan province (top right, yellow)

- Location of Isfahan province in Iran
- Coordinates: 33°38′N 52°21′E
- Country: Iran
- Province: Isfahan
- Capital: Ardestan
- Districts: Central, Mahabad, Zavareh

Population (2016)
  - Total: 42,105
- Time zone: UTC+3:30 (IRST)

Ardestan County (Persian: شهرستان اردستان) is in Isfahan province, Iran. Its capital is the city of Ardestan.

== History ==
In 2019, Garmsir and Hombarat Rural Districts, and the city of Mahabad, were separated from the Central District in the formation of Mahabad District.

== Demographics ==
=== Population ===
At the time of the 2006 National Census, the county's population was 43,585 in 12,587 households. The following census in 2011 counted 41,405 people in 12,930 households. The 2016 census measured the population of the county as 42,105 in 14,140 households.

=== Administrative divisions ===
Ardestan County's population history and administrative structure over three consecutive censuses are shown in the following table.

Ardestan County Population
Administrative Divisions	2006	2011	2016
Central District	30,838	29,011	29,427
Barzavand RD	3,943	2,937	2,972
Garmsir RD	3,781	3,388	3,218
Hombarat RD	728	554	830
Kachu RD	1,771	1,295	1,483
Olya RD	1,836	1,480	1,453
Ardestan (city)	14,698	15,701	15,744
Mahabad (city)	4,081	3,656	3,727
Mahabad District (Note: Established after the 2016 census)			
Garmsir RD			
Hombarat RD			
Mahabad (city)			
Zavareh District	12,747	12,394	12,678
Rigestan RD	4,157	4,040	3,953
Sofla RD	784	540	405
Zavareh (city)	7,806	7,814	8,320
Total	43,585	41,405	42,105
RD = Rural District

== See also ==
Media related to Ardestan County at Wikimedia Commons
