= Central District (Nain County) =

District in Isfahan province, Iran

Central District (Nain County) Persian: بخش مرکزی شهرستان نائین
- District
- Location within Iran
- Coordinates: 32°56′N 53°09′E
- Country: Iran
- Province: Isfahan
- County: Nain
- Capital: Nain

Population (2016)
  - Total: 35,440
- Time zone: UTC+3:30 (IRST)

The Central District of Nain County (Persian: بخش مرکزی شهرستان نائین) is in Isfahan province, Iran. Its capital is the city of Nain.

== History ==
The village of Bafran was converted to a city in 2008.

== Demographics ==
=== Population ===
At the time of the 2006 National Census, the district's population was 33,906 in 10,025 households. The following census in 2011 counted 34,177 people in 10,943 households. The 2016 census measured the population of the district as 35,440 inhabitants in 12,048 households.

=== Administrative divisions ===
Central District (Nain County) Population
Administrative Divisions	2006	2011	2016
Bafran RD	3,603	1,782	1,483
Baharestan RD	1,603	1,444	1,302
Kuhestan RD	1,735	992	996
Lay Siyah RD	2,541	2,553	2,302
Bafran (city)		2,027	1,978
Nain (city)	24,424	25,379	27,379
Total	33,906	34,177	35,440
RD = Rural District
