= Nain County =

County in Isfahan province, Iran

Nain County Persian: شهرستان نائین
- County
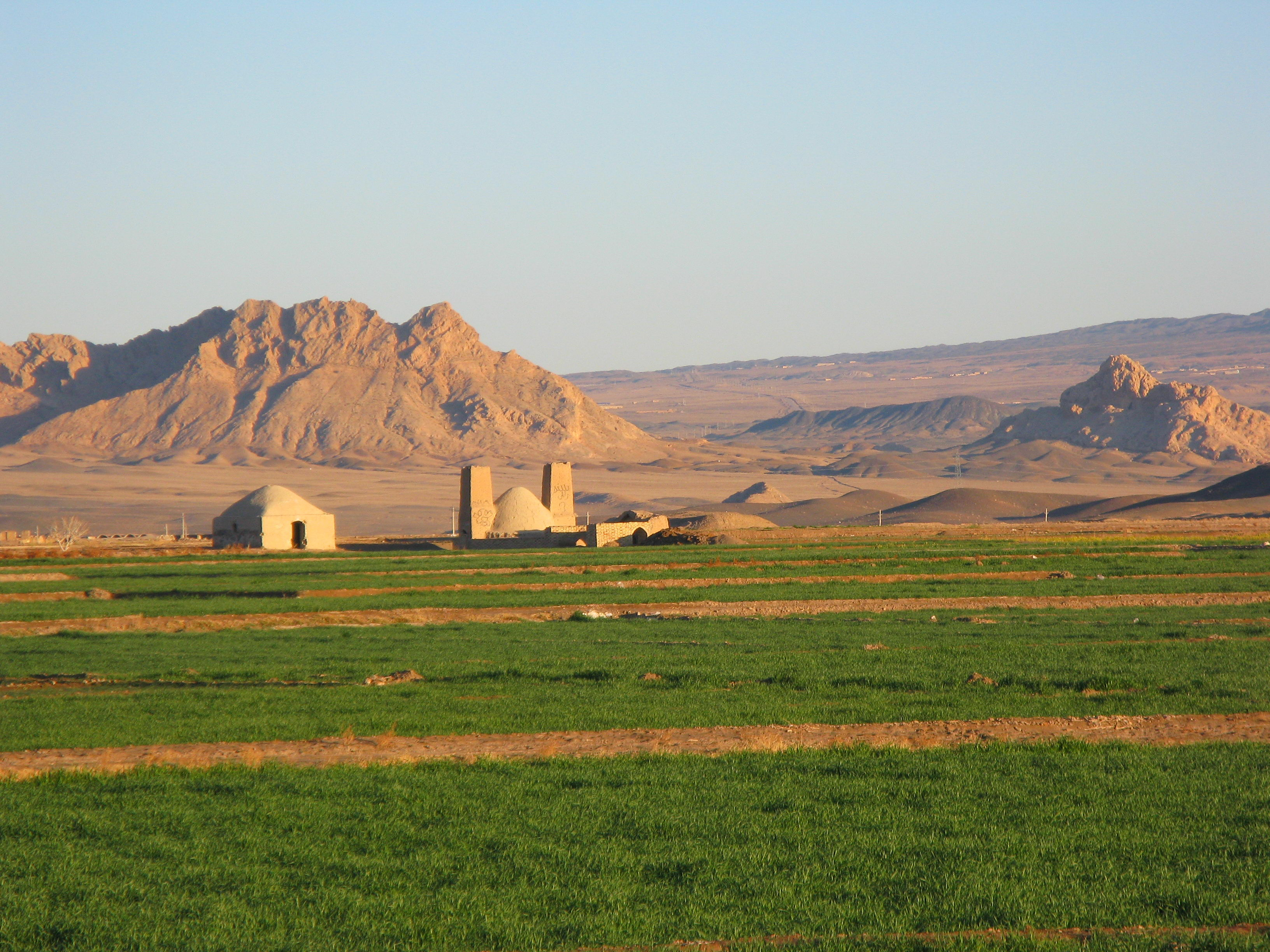
- Agricultural landscape in Nain County

- Location of Nain County in Isfahan province (right, green)

- Location of Isfahan province in Iran
- Coordinates: 33°22′N 53°29′E
- Country: Iran
- Province: Isfahan
- Capital: Nain
- Districts: Central, Anarak

Population (2016)
  - Total: 39,261
- Time zone: UTC+3:30 (IRST)

Nain County (Persian: شهرستان نائین) is in Isfahan province, Iran. Its capital is the city of Nain.

== History ==
The village of Bafran was converted to a city in 2008. In 2009, Khur and Biabanak District was separated from the county in the establishment of Khur and Biabanak County.

== Demographics ==
=== Population ===
At the time of the 2006 National Census, the county's population was 54,298 in 15,919 households. The following census in 2011 counted 38,077 people in 12,123 households. The 2016 census measured the population of the county as 39,261 in 13,378 households.

=== Administrative divisions ===
Nain County's population history and administrative structure over three consecutive censuses are shown in the following table.

Nain County Population
Administrative Divisions	2006	2011	2016
Central District	33,906	34,177	35,440
Bafran RD	3,603	1,782	1,483
Baharestan RD	1,603	1,444	1,302
Kuhestan RD	1,735	992	996
Lay Siyah RD	2,541	2,553	2,302
Bafran (city)		2,027	1,978
Nain (city)	24,424	25,379	27,379
Anarak District	2,904	3,900	3,820
Chupanan RD	1,619	2,423	1,917
Anarak (city)	1,285	1,477	1,903
Khur and Biabanak District (Note: Transferred to Khur and Biabanak County)	17,488		
Biabanak RD	4,710		
Jandaq RD	208		
Nakhlestan RD	2,396		
Jandaq (city)	3,958		
Khur (city)	6,216		
Total	54,298	38,077	39,261
RD = Rural District

== See also ==
Media related to Nain County at Wikimedia Commons
