= Azaran =

Azaran or Azeran or Azran (Persian: آذَران) may refer to:

== Places ==
- Azaran, Isfahan, Iran
- Eziran, or Azrān, Isfahan Province, Iran
- Azaran, Mazandaran, Iran
- Hashtrud, also known as Āz̄arān, East Azerbaijan Province, Iran

== Other uses ==
- Azaran, a fictional country in TV series The Andromeda Breakthrough
- The Azran Civilisation in Professor Layton and the Azran Legacy
