= Pileh (disambiguation) =

Pileh (Persian: پيله) may refer to several places in Iran:

- Pileh Daraq, a village in Germi County, Ardabil province
- Pileh Sehran, a village in Nir County, Ardabil province
- Pileh Jin, a village in Razan County, Hamadan province
- Pileh Mahalleh, a village in Langarud County, Gilan province
- Pileh Darbon, a village in Rasht County, Gilan province
- Pileh Varan, a village in Isfahan County, Isfahan province
- Pilehgah, a village in Khorramabad County, Lorestan province
- Pileh Kuh, a village in Miandorud County, Mazandaran province
- Pileh Savar, a village in Poldasht County, West Azerbaijan province
