= Shahshahan Mausoleum =

Islamic mausoleum in Isfahan, Iran

- آرامگاه شهشهان
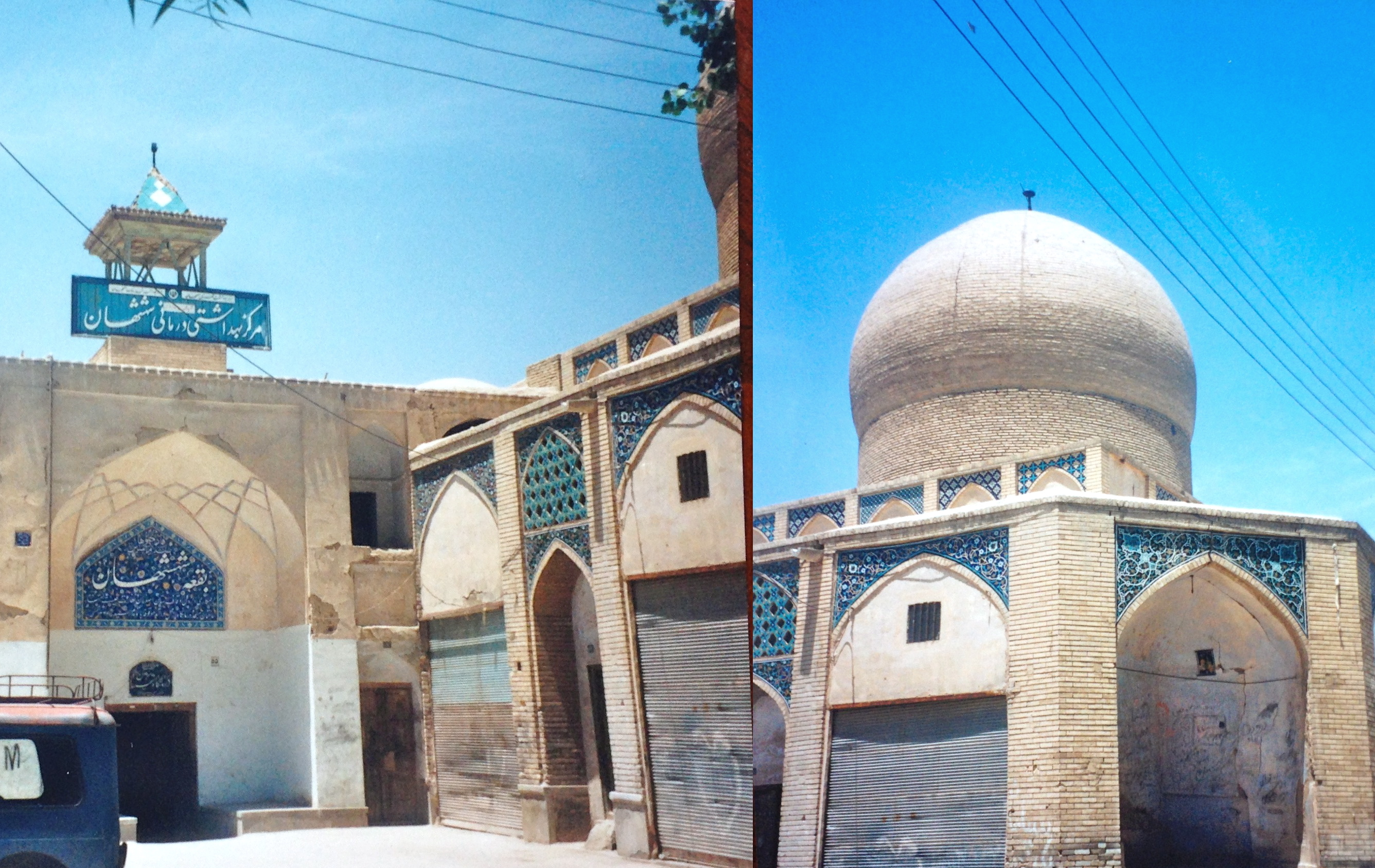
- A composite image; gateway of the mausoleum (left); mausoleum (right)

- Location of the complex in Iran

Religion
- Affiliation: Islam
- Ecclesiastical or organisational status: Mausoleum
- Status: Active

Location
- Location: Ebn-e Sina, Isfahan, Isfahan province
- Country: Iran
- Interactive map of Shahshahan Mausoleum
- Coordinates: 32°40′26″N 51°41′3″E

Architecture
- Type: Islamic architecture
- Style: Timurid architecture
- Completed: c.852 AH (1448/1449 CE)

Specifications
- Dome: One
- Shrine: One: Shah Alaeddin
- Materials: Bricks; plaster; tiles

Website
- shahshahani.info/monument

Iran National Heritage List
- Official name: Shahshahan Mausoleum
- Type: Mausoleum
- Designated: 1949
- Reference no.: 368
- Conservation organization: Cultural Heritage, Handicrafts and Tourism Organization of Iran

The Shahshahan Mausoleum (Persian: آرامگاه شهشهان), officially known as the Buq'ah-i Shah 'Ala al-Din Muhammad, is a mausoleum and hussainiya, located in the Ebn-e Sina district of Isfahan, Isfahan province, Iran. The mausoleum contains the tomb of Shah Ala al-Din Muhammad, or known simply as Shah Alaeddin. It was built in c.852 AH (1448/1449 CE), during the Timurid era.

The complex was listed on the Iran National Heritage List on 21 February 1949; and is administered by the Cultural Heritage, Handicrafts and Tourism Organization of Iran.

== History ==
Shah Alaeddin was executed by hanging in 1446 CE on the orders of Timurid ruler Shah Rukh for being a close associate of his rival, Sultan Muhammad ibn Baysunghur. His body was dumped in the town of Saveh. A year later, Shah Rukh died, and so Sultan Muhammad came to power. Sultan Muhammad moved the body of Shah Alaeddin from Saveh to Isfahan, and buried him in the old neighbourhood of Hosseiniyeh, where his khanqah was, adjacent to the Jameh Mosque of Isfahan. The Sultan also built a domed mausoleum for him over his new grave.

During the Safavid era and the reign of Abbas the Great, the mausoleum was repaired by a woman named Khanum Sultan, also known as Banoo Sultan. She was not buried there, however, and was moved to Mashhad instead.

The mausoleum received a revival in 1950, when a descendant of Shah Alaeddin, Hossein Shahshahani, repaired and rebuilt the mausoleum. He also constructed a madrasah and a health centre beside it. His work was assisted by his younger brother Morteza Shahshahani. He was buried in the mausoleum in 1962.

== Architecture ==
The Shahshahan Mausoleum is decorated both inside and outside with intricate plasterwork and tiling. All around the inside of the dome, there are calligraphy of fourteen poems in Arabic which describe the execution of Shah Alaeddin in the 15th century. These calligraphy works were done by Seyyed Mahmood Naghash.

The lower section of the walls of the mausoleum are decorated with tile works that are hexagonal in shape. On the top of the entrance door, on the east side, there are three lines of poem from Saadi Shirazi, which are now barely visible and have nearly faded.

== Endowments and related documents ==
As part his respect to Shah Alaeddin Mohammad, after the construction of the mausoleum, Sultan Muhammad made several major endowments for the Shahshahan Mausoleum. They included, among others, the village of Esfehanak, (Note: Esfahanak, meaning small Isfahan, is an agricultural area with a population of more than 4,000 households.) the village of Valasan in Freidan and Darzian in the district of Kararag, or Keraj Rural District located mostly about few miles south on the road from Isfahan to Shiraz. These properties were primarily cultivated farms and orchards. The intention was to use the income, generated by these endowments, to pay for the upkeep and expenses of the restoration and rehabilitation of the mausoleum and the adjacent Hosseiniyeh. (Note: The Hosseiniyeh is a building that dates back to Shah Alaeddin's ancestors. It does not refer to a Hussainiyah, but it refers to a structure known as "House of Sayyids" (Dar al-Sadat) which is attached to the mausoleum.)

The scroll documenting the endowment of the aforementioned properties has been certified by several prominent scholars, including Sheikh Baha al-Din Muhammad al-'Amili during the Safavid period.

== Gallery ==
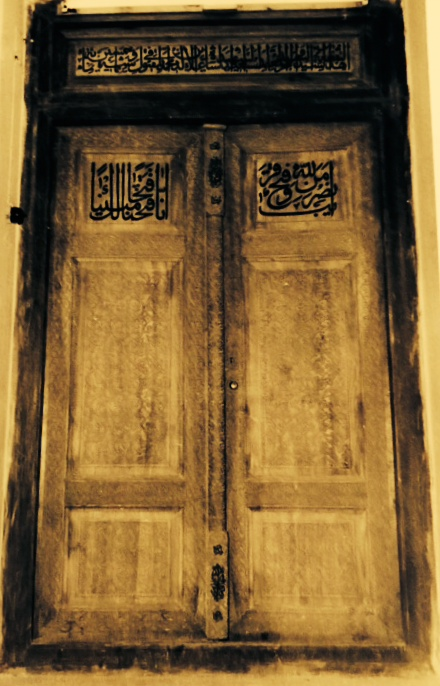
Main door of the mausoleum

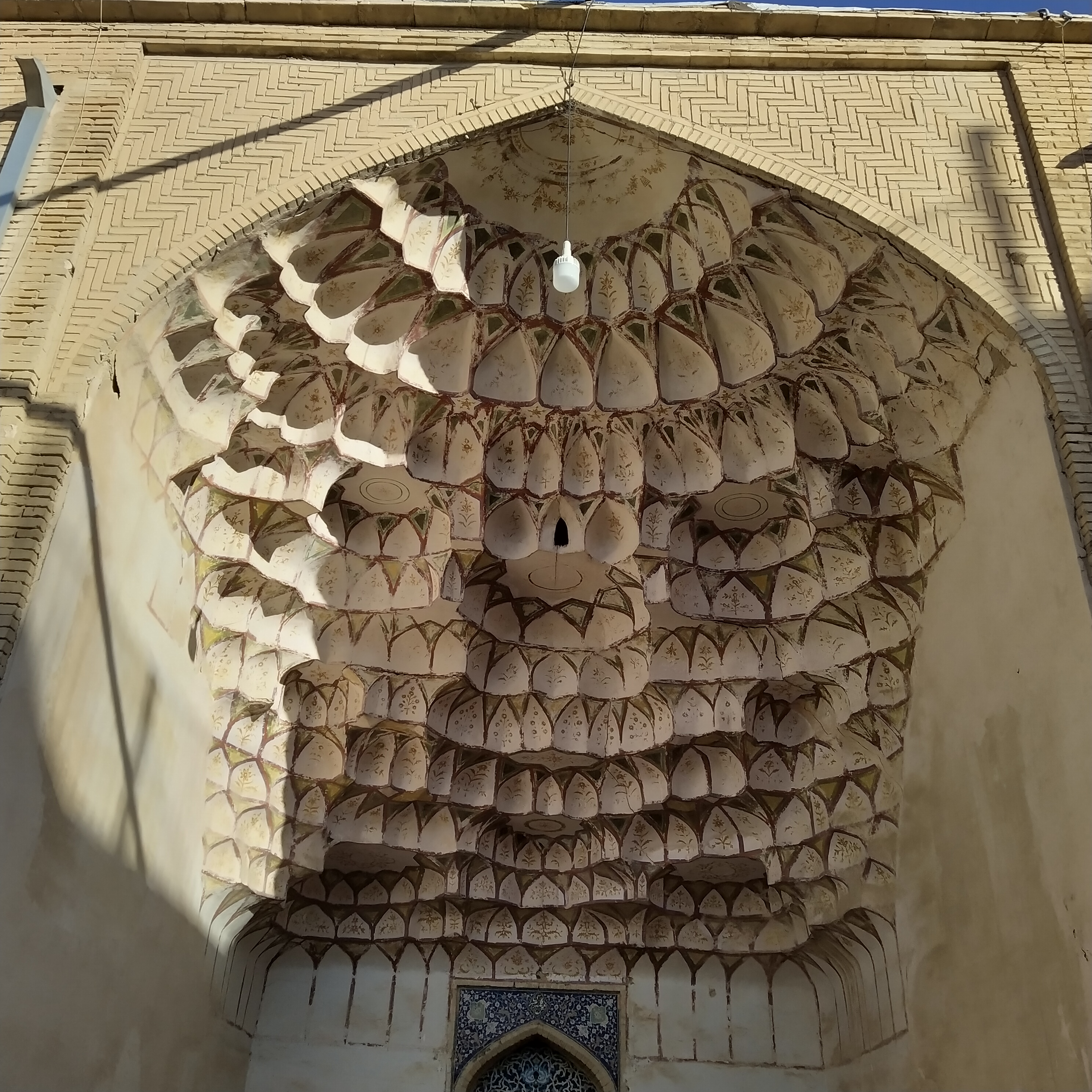
Muqarnas plasterwork visible on the upper part of the entrance

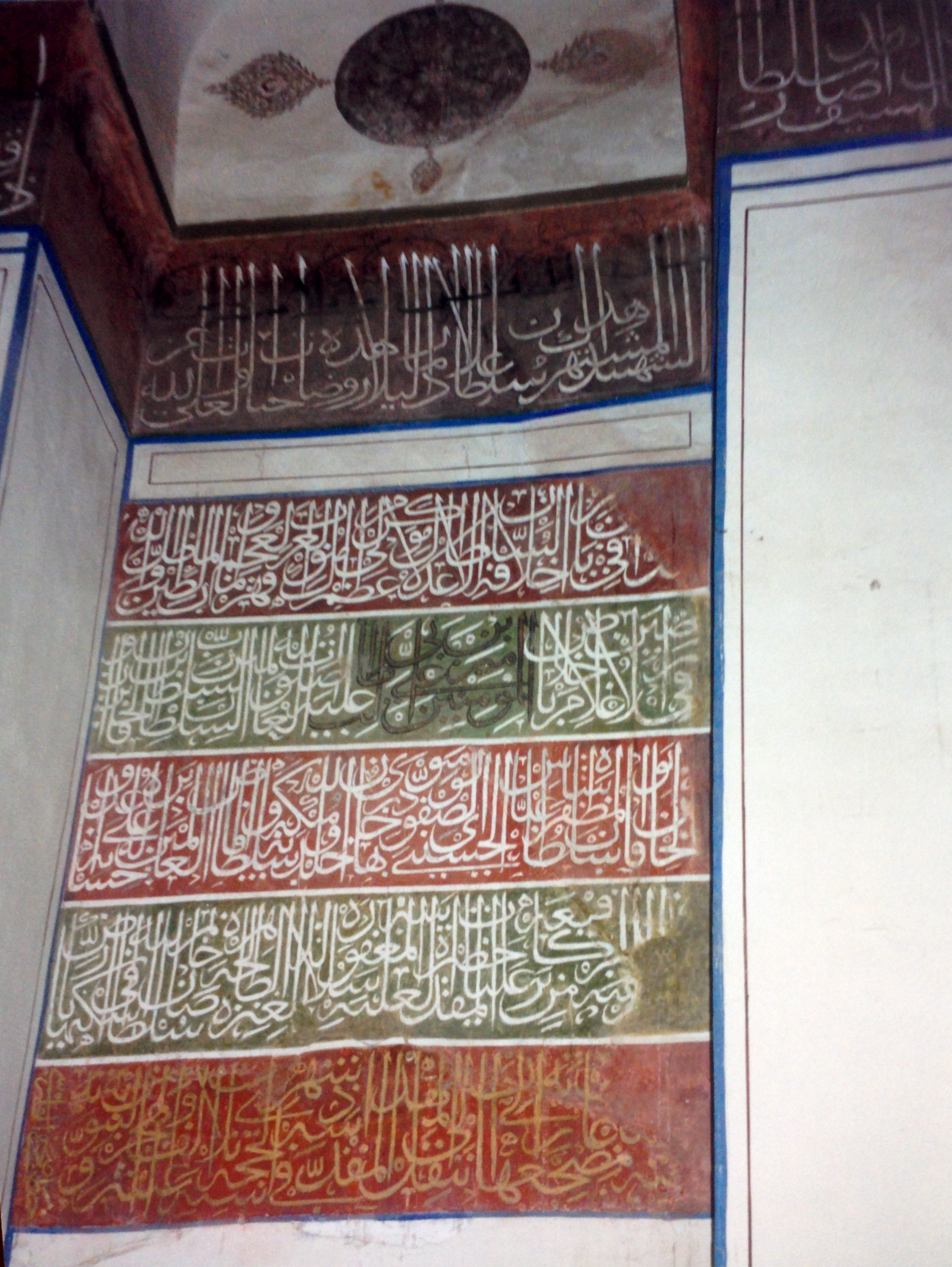
Calligraphy of Seyyed Mahmood Naghash

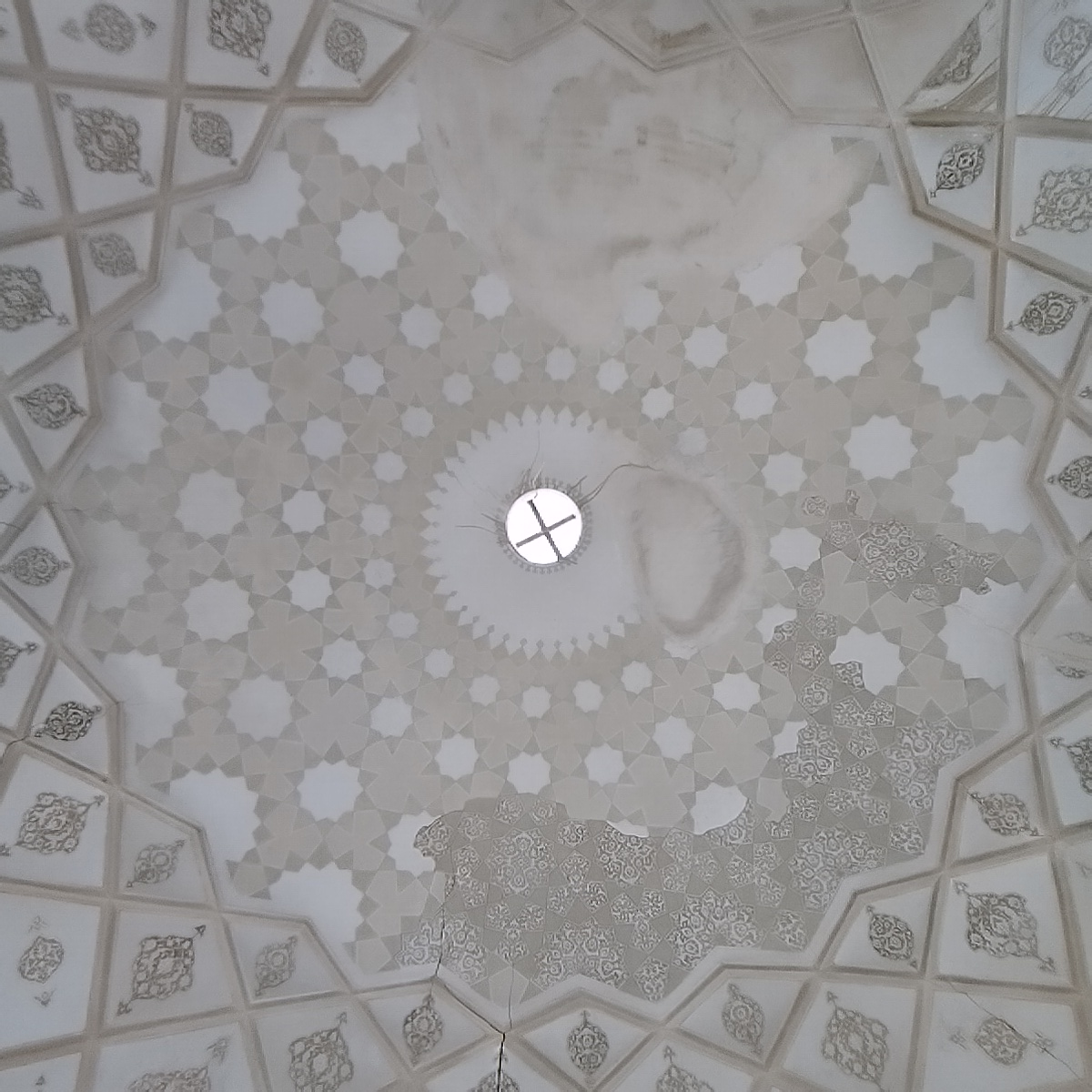
The interior of the dome

== See also ==
- List of historical structures in Isfahan
- List of mausoleums in Iran
- Hussainiyas
