= Baraan =

Baraan (Persian: براآن) may refer to:

- Baraan-e Jonubi Rural District
- Baraan-e Shomali Rural District
