= Andevan =

Neighborhood in Isfahan province, Iran

Andevan Persian: اندوان
- Neighborhood
- Location within Iran
- Coordinates: 32°41′48″N 51°46′06″E
- Country: Iran
- Province: Isfahan
- County: Isfahan
- District: Central
- City: Isfahan

Population (2011)
  - Total: 914
- Time zone: UTC+3:30 (IRST)

Andevan (Persian: اندوان) (Note: Also romanized as Andevān) is a neighborhood in the city of Isfahan in the Central District of Isfahan County, Isfahan province, Iran.

== Demographics ==
=== Population ===
At the time of the 2006 National Census, Andevan's population was 849 in 219 households, when it was a village in Qahab-e Shomali Rural District. The following census in 2011 counted 914 people in 267 households. After the census, the village was annexed by the city of Isfahan.
