= Susart =

Village in Isfahan province, Iran

Susart Persian: سوسارت
- Village
- Location within Iran
- Coordinates: 32°38′55″N 51°53′25″E
- Country: Iran
- Province: Isfahan
- County: Isfahan
- District: Central
- Rural District: Qahab-e Jonubi

Population (2016)
  - Total: 281
- Time zone: UTC+3:30 (IRST)

Susart (Persian: سوسارت) (Note: Also romanized as Sūsārt; also known as Sāsūrt, Sūsārd, and Sūsāt) is a village in Qahab-e Jonubi Rural District of the Central District in Isfahan County, Isfahan province, Iran.

== Demographics ==
=== Population ===
At the time of the 2006 National Census, the village's population was 285 in 74 households. The following census in 2011 counted 284 people in 85 households. The 2016 census measured the population of the village as 281 people in 92 households.
