= Sadeqabad, Isfahan =

Village in Isfahan province, Iran

Sadeqabad Persian: صادق اباد
- Village
- Location within Iran
- Country: Iran
- Province: Isfahan
- County: Isfahan
- District: Central
- Rural District: Keraraj

Population (2016)
  - Total: 0
- Time zone: UTC+3:30 (IRST)

Sadeqabad (Persian: صادق اباد) (Note: Also romanized as Şādeqābād) is a village in Keraraj Rural District of the Central District in Isfahan County, Isfahan province, Iran.

== Demographics ==
=== Population ===
At the time of the 2006 National Census, the village's population was 22 in four households. The following census in 2011 again counted 22 people in four households. The 2016 census measured the population of the village as zero.
