= Ichi, Iran =

Village in Isfahan province, Iran

Ichi Persian: ايچي
- Village
- Location within Iran
- Coordinates: 32°31′57″N 51°51′36″E
- Country: Iran
- Province: Isfahan
- County: Isfahan
- District: Central
- Rural District: Keraraj

Population (2016)
  - Total: 1,793
- Time zone: UTC+3:30 (IRST)

Ichi (Persian: ايچي) (Note: Also romanized as Īchī) is a village in Keraraj Rural District of the Central District in Isfahan County, Isfahan province, Iran.

== Demographics ==
=== Population ===
At the time of the 2006 National Census, the village's population was 1,446 in 363 households. The following census in 2011 counted 1,745 people in 493 households. The 2016 census measured the population of the village as 1,793 people in 507 households.
