= Hermedan =

Village in Isfahan province, Iran

Hermedan Persian: هرمدان
- Village
- Location within Iran
- Coordinates: 32°30′32″N 51°52′48″E
- Country: Iran
- Province: Isfahan
- County: Isfahan
- District: Central
- Rural District: Baraan-e Jonubi

Population (2016)
  - Total: 776
- Time zone: UTC+3:30 (IRST)

Hermedan (Persian: هرمدان) (Note: Also romanized as Hermedān) is a village in Baraan-e Jonubi Rural District of the Central District in Isfahan County, Isfahan province, Iran.

== Demographics ==
=== Population ===
At the time of the 2006 National Census, the village's population was 680 in 175 households. The following census in 2011 counted 709 people in 208 households. The 2016 census measured the population of the village as 776 people in 233 households.
