= Mohammadabad, Qahab-e Jonubi (West) =

Neighborhood in Isfahan province, Iran

Mohammadabad Persian: محمداباد
- Neighborhood
- Location within Iran
- Coordinates: 32°40′00″N 51°46′55″E
- Country: Iran
- Province: Isfahan
- County: Isfahan
- District: Central
- City: Isfahan

Population (2011)
  - Total: 972
- Time zone: UTC+3:30 (IRST)

Mohammadabad (Persian: محمداباد) (Note: Also romanized as Moḩammadābād; also known as Mohammadabad-e Deh Now (محمداباد ده نو)) is a neighborhood in the city of Isfahan in the Central District of Isfahan County, Isfahan province, Iran.

== Demographics ==
=== Population ===
At the time of the 2006 National Census, Mohammadabad's population was 796 in 225 households, when it was a village in Qahab-e Jonubi Rural District. The following census in 2011 counted 972 people in 298 households. After the census, the village was annexed by the city of Isfahan.
