= Jaladeran =

Village in Isfahan province, Iran

Jaladeran Persian: جلادران
- Village
- Location within Iran
- Coordinates: 32°41′10″N 51°53′27″E
- Country: Iran
- Province: Isfahan
- County: Isfahan
- District: Central
- Rural District: Qahab-e Jonubi

Population (2016)
  - Total: 383
- Time zone: UTC+3:30 (IRST)

Jaladeran (Persian: جلادران) (Note: Also romanized as Jalādarān and Jalāderān; also known as Jalālābād) is a village in Qahab-e Jonubi Rural District of the Central District in Isfahan County, Isfahan province, Iran.

== Demographics ==
=== Population ===
At the time of the 2006 National Census, the village's population was 301 in 75 households. The following census in 2011 counted 215 people in 61 households. The 2016 census measured the population of the village as 383 people in 96 households.
