= Timyart =

Village in Isfahan province, Iran

Timyart Persian: تيميارت
- Village
- Location within Iran
- Coordinates: 32°32′46″N 52°01′10″E
- Country: Iran
- Province: Isfahan
- County: Isfahan
- District: Central
- Rural District: Baraan-e Shomali

Population (2016)
  - Total: 1,457
- Time zone: UTC+3:30 (IRST)

Timyart (Persian: تيميارت) (Note: Also romanized as Tīmyārt) is a village in Baraan-e Shomali Rural District of the Central District in Isfahan County, Isfahan province, Iran.

== Demographics ==
=== Population ===
At the time of the 2006 National Census, the village's population was 1,520 in 361 households. The following census in 2011 counted 1,328 people in 388 households. The 2016 census measured the population of the village as 1,457 people in 453 households.
