= Gavart =

Neighborhood in Isfahan province, Iran

Gavart Persian: گورت
- Neighborhood
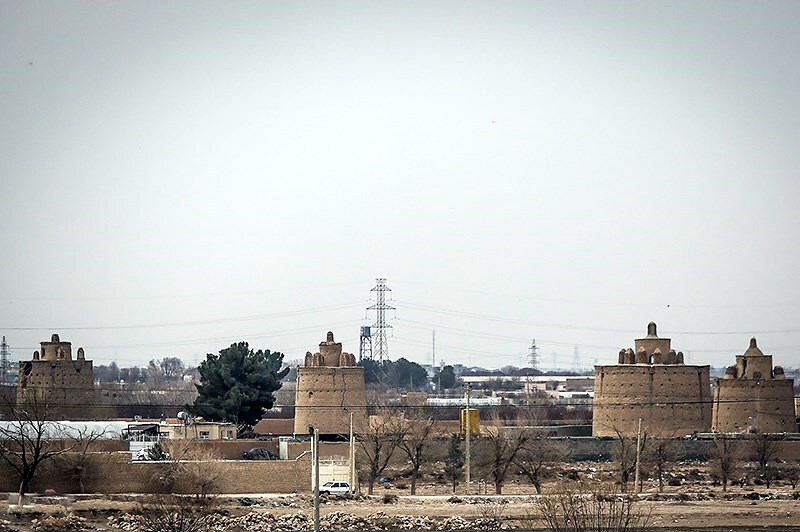
- Dovecotes in the Isfahan neighborhood of Gavart

- Location within Iran
- Coordinates: 32°39′27″N 51°49′04″E
- Country: Iran
- Province: Isfahan
- County: Isfahan
- District: Central
- City: Isfahan

Population (2011)
  - Total: 4,810
- Time zone: UTC+3:30 (IRST)

Gavart (Persian: گورت) (Note: Also known as Qasr Gāvart and Qaşr-e Gavart) is a neighborhood in the city of Isfahan in the Central District of Isfahan County, Isfahan province, Iran.

== Demographics ==
=== Population ===
At the time of the 2006 National Census, Gavart's population was 4,612 in 1,181 households, when it was a village in, and the capital of, Qahab-e Jonubi Rural District. The following census in 2011 counted 4,810 people in 1,317 households. After the census, the village was annexed by the city of Isfahan.
