= Jilanabad =

Village in Isfahan province, Iran

Jilanabad Persian: جیلان‌آباد
- Village
- Location within Iran
- Coordinates: 32°39′54″N 51°53′57″E
- Country: Iran
- Province: Isfahan
- County: Isfahan
- District: Central
- Rural District: Qahab-e Jonubi

Population (2016)
  - Total: 1,471
- Time zone: UTC+3:30 (IRST)

Jilanabad (Persian: جیلان‌آباد) (Note: Also romanized as Jīlānābād; also known as Golonābād (گلنادباد), Golūnābād (گلون‌آباد), Gulnābād, and Qal‘eh-ye Golnābād) is a village in Qahab-e Jonubi Rural District of the Central District in Isfahan County, Isfahan province, Iran.

== Demographics ==
=== Population ===
At the time of the 2006 National Census, the village's population was 1,459 in 351 households. The following census in 2011 counted 1,503 people in 446 households. The 2016 census measured the population of the village as 1,471 people in 449 households, the most populous in its rural district.
