= Eshkavand =

Village in Isfahan province, Iran

Eshkavand Persian: اشكاوند
- Village
- Location within Iran
- Coordinates: 32°34′43″N 51°45′23″E
- Country: Iran
- Province: Isfahan
- County: Isfahan
- District: Central
- Rural District: Keraraj

Population (2016)
  - Total: 3,049
- Time zone: UTC+3:30 (IRST)

Eshkavand (Persian: اشكاوند) (Note: Also romanized as Ashkāvand and Eshkāvand; also known as ‘Āsheqvān, ‘Ishqwān, and Qal‘eh-ye Mardān) is a village in Keraraj Rural District of the Central District in Isfahan County, Isfahan province, Iran.

== Demographics ==
=== Population ===
At the time of the 2006 National Census, the village's population was 2,557 in 699 households. The following census in 2011 counted 3,925 people in 1,084 households. The 2016 census measured the population of the village as 3,049 people in 956 households.
