= Keychi, Isfahan =

Village in Isfahan province, Iran

Keychi Persian: كيچي
- Village
- Location within Iran
- Coordinates: 32°30′05″N 51°46′46″E
- Country: Iran
- Province: Isfahan
- County: Isfahan
- District: Central
- Rural District: Keraraj

Population (2016)
  - Total: 960
- Time zone: UTC+3:30 (IRST)

Keychi (Persian: كيچي) (Note: Also romanized as Keychī and Kī Chī; also known as Gachī, Kachī, Kechī, Qeychī, and Qīchi) is a village in Keraraj Rural District of the Central District in Isfahan County, Isfahan province, Iran.

== Demographics ==
=== Population ===
At the time of the 2006 National Census, the village's population was 264 in 67 households. The following census in 2011 counted 727 people in 184 households. The 2016 census measured the population of the village as 960 people in 249 households.
