= Shahrak-e Vali-ye Asr, Isfahan =

Neighborhood in Isfahan province, Iran

Shahrak-e Vali-ye Asr Persian: شهرك ولي عصر
- Neighborhood
- Location within Iran
- Coordinates: 32°44′17″N 51°39′41″E
- Country: Iran
- Province: Isfahan
- County: Isfahan
- District: Central
- City: Isfahan

Population (2011)
  - Total: 5,499
- Time zone: UTC+3:30 (IRST)

Shahrak-e Vali-ye Asr (Persian: شهرك ولي عصر) (Note: Also romanized as Shahrak-e Valī‘aşr and Shahrak-e Valī-ye ‘Aşr) is a neighborhood in the city of Isfahan in the Central District of Isfahan County, Isfahan province, Iran.

== Demographics ==
=== Population ===
At the time of the 2006 National Census, Shahrak-e Vali-ye Asr's population was 4,689 in 1,151 households, when it was a village in Mahmudabad Rural District. The following census in 2011 counted 5,499 people in 1,542 households. After the census, the village was annexed by the city of Isfahan.
