= Khatunabad, Isfahan =

Neighborhood in Isfahan province, Iran

Khatunabad Persian: خاتون اباد
- Neighborhood
- Location within Iran
- Coordinates: 32°39′37″N 51°47′20″E
- Country: Iran
- Province: Isfahan
- County: Isfahan
- District: Central
- City: Isfahan

Population (2011)
  - Total: 1,714
- Time zone: UTC+3:30 (IRST)

Khatunabad (Persian: خاتون اباد) (Note: Also romanized as Khātūnābād) is a neighborhood in the city of Isfahan in the Central District of Isfahan County, Isfahan province, Iran.

== Demographics ==
=== Population ===
At the time of the 2006 National Census, Khatunabad's population was 2,039 in 547 households, when it was a village in Qahab-e Jonubi Rural District. The following census in 2011 counted 1,714 people in 516 households. After the census, the village was annexed by the city of Isfahan.
