= Qaleh-ye Shur =

Village in Isfahan province, Iran

Qaleh-ye Shur Persian: قلعه شور
- Village
- Location within Iran
- Coordinates: 32°30′10″N 51°45′14″E
- Country: Iran
- Province: Isfahan
- County: Isfahan
- District: Central
- Rural District: Keraraj

Population (2016)
  - Total: 451
- Time zone: UTC+3:30 (IRST)

Qaleh-ye Shur (Persian: قلعه شور) (Note: Also romanized as Qal‘eh Shūr, Qal‘eh-e Shūr, and Qal‘eh-ye Shūr; also known as Qal‘eh-ye Shūr Zar) is a village in Keraraj Rural District of the Central District in Isfahan County, Isfahan province, Iran.

== Demographics ==
=== Population ===
At the time of the 2006 National Census, the village's population was 242 in 71 households. The following census in 2011 counted 658 people in 195 households. The 2016 census measured the population of the village as 451 people in 138 households.
