= Mulenjan =

Village in Isfahan province, Iran

Mulenjan Persian: مولنجان
- Village
- Location within Iran
- Coordinates: 32°43′07″N 51°47′49″E
- Country: Iran
- Province: Isfahan
- County: Isfahan
- District: Central
- Rural District: Qahab-e Shomali

Population (2016)
  - Total: 550
- Time zone: UTC+3:30 (IRST)

Mulenjan (Persian: مولنجان) (Note: Also romanized as Mūlenjān) is a village in Qahab-e Shomali Rural District of the Central District in Isfahan County, Isfahan province, Iran.

== Demographics ==
=== Population ===
At the time of the 2006 National Census, the village's population was 557 in 161 households. The following census in 2011 counted 461 people in 149 households. The 2016 census measured the population of the village as 550 people in 174 households.
