= Fasaran =

Village in Isfahan province, Iran

Fasaran Persian: فساران
- Village
- Location within Iran
- Coordinates: 32°33′42″N 51°59′56″E
- Country: Iran
- Province: Isfahan
- County: Isfahan
- District: Central
- Rural District: Baraan-e Shomali

Population (2016)
  - Total: 1,139
- Time zone: UTC+3:30 (IRST)

Fasaran (Persian: فساران) (Note: Also romanized as Fasārān and Fesārān; also known as Feysārū and Fīsāru) is a village in Baraan-e Shomali Rural District of the Central District in Isfahan County, Isfahan province, Iran.

== Demographics ==
=== Population ===
At the time of the 2006 National Census, the village's population was 1,560 in 375 households. The following census in 2011 counted 1,347 people in 396 households. The 2016 census measured the population of the village as 1,139 people in 342 households.
