= Aminabad, Mahmudabad =

Neighborhood in Isfahan province, Iran

Aminabad Persian: امين اباد
- Neighborhood
- Location within Iran
- Coordinates: 32°45′03″N 51°33′54″E
- Country: Iran
- Province: Isfahan
- County: Isfahan
- District: Central
- City: Isfahan

Population (2011)
  - Total: 1,284
- Time zone: UTC+3:30 (IRST)

Aminabad (Persian: امين اباد) (Note: Also romanized as Amīnābād) is a neighborhood in the city of Isfahan in the Central District of Isfahan County, Isfahan province, Iran.

== Demographics ==
=== Population ===
At the time of the 2006 National Census, Aminabad's population was 876 in 255 households, when it was a village in Mahmudabad Rural District. The following census in 2011 counted 1,284 people in 313 households. After the census, the village was annexed by the city of Isfahan.
