= Kolartan =

Village in Isfahan province, Iran

Kolartan Persian: كلارتان
- Village
- Location within Iran
- Coordinates: 32°30′12″N 51°55′03″E
- Country: Iran
- Province: Isfahan
- County: Isfahan
- District: Central
- Rural District: Baraan-e Jonubi

Population (2016)
  - Total: 537
- Time zone: UTC+3:30 (IRST)

Kolartan (Persian: كلارتان) (Note: Also romanized as Kalārtān and Kolārtān; also known as Kolortān) is a village in Baraan-e Jonubi Rural District of the Central District in Isfahan County, Isfahan province, Iran.

== Demographics ==
=== Population ===
At the time of the 2006 National Census, the village's population was 506 in 133 households. The following census in 2011 counted 612 people in 178 households. The 2016 census measured the population of the village as 537 people in 166 households.
