= Heydarabad, Isfahan =

Village in Isfahan province, Iran

Heydarabad Persian: حيدراباد
- Village
- Location within Iran
- Coordinates: 32°32′52″N 51°46′26″E
- Country: Iran
- Province: Isfahan
- County: Isfahan
- District: Central
- Rural District: Keraraj

Population (2016)
  - Total: 689
- Time zone: UTC+3:30 (IRST)

Heydarabad (Persian: حيدراباد) (Note: Also romanized as Ḩeydarābād) is a village in Keraraj Rural District of the Central District in Isfahan County, Isfahan province, Iran.

== Demographics ==
=== Population ===
At the time of the 2006 National Census, the village's population was 973 in 240 households. The following census in 2011 counted 735 people in 200 households. The 2016 census measured the population of the village as 689 people in 198 households.
