= Jowzdan, Isfahan =

Village in Isfahan province, Iran

Jowzdan Persian: جوزدان
- Village
- Location within Iran
- Coordinates: 32°34′07″N 51°50′45″E
- Country: Iran
- Province: Isfahan
- County: Isfahan
- District: Central
- Rural District: Baraan-e Shomali

Population (2016)
  - Total: 891
- Time zone: UTC+3:30 (IRST)

Jowzdan (Persian: جوزدان) (Note: Also romanized as Jowzdān and Jowzedān; also known as Jowzevān and Jūzūn) is a village in Baraan-e Shomali Rural District of the Central District in Isfahan County, Isfahan province, Iran.

== Demographics ==
=== Population ===
At the time of the 2006 National Census, the village's population was 933 in 226 households. The following census in 2011 counted 913 people in 265 households. The 2016 census measured the population of the village as 891 people in 290 households.
