= Dinan, Iran =

Dinan (Persian: دينان), in Iran, may refer to:

- Dinan, Isfahan
- Dinan, Mazandaran
