= Bastanabad =

Village in Isfahan province, Iran

Bastanabad Persian: باستان اباد
- Village
- Location within Iran
- Coordinates: 32°31′16″N 51°41′48″E
- Country: Iran
- Province: Isfahan
- County: Isfahan
- District: Central
- Rural District: Keraraj

Population (2016)
  - Total: 56
- Time zone: UTC+3:30 (IRST)

Bastanabad (Persian: باستان اباد) (Note: Also romanized as Bāstānābād) is a village in Keraraj Rural District of the Central District in Isfahan County, Isfahan province, Iran.

== Demographics ==
=== Population ===
At the time of the 2006 National Census, the village's population was 404 in 114 households. The following census in 2011 counted 288 people in 86 households. The 2016 census measured the population of the village as 56 people in 17 households.
