= Golestaneh, Keraraj =

Village in Isfahan province, Iran

Golestaneh Persian: گلستانه
- Village
- Location within Iran
- Coordinates: 32°31′26″N 51°49′32″E
- Country: Iran
- Province: Isfahan
- County: Isfahan
- District: Central
- Rural District: Keraraj

Population (2016)
  - Total: 88
- Time zone: UTC+3:30 (IRST)

Golestaneh (Persian: گلستانه) (Note: Also romanized as Golestāneh; also known as Golastān) is a village in Keraraj Rural District of the Central District in Isfahan County, Isfahan province, Iran.

== Demographics ==
=== Population ===
At the time of the 2006 National Census, the village's population was 88 in 27 households. The following census in 2011 counted 82 people in 28 households. The 2016 census measured the population of the village as 88 people in 30 households.
