= Murnan =

Village in Isfahan province, Iran

Murnan Persian: مورنان
- Village
- Location within Iran
- Coordinates: 32°41′28″N 51°47′10″E
- Country: Iran
- Province: Isfahan
- County: Isfahan
- District: Central
- Rural District: Qahab-e Shomali

Population (2016)
  - Total: 540
- Time zone: UTC+3:30 (IRST)

Murnan (Persian: مورنان) (Note: Also romanized as Mūrnān; also known as Mūrānī) is a village in Qahab-e Shomali Rural District of the Central District in Isfahan County, Isfahan province, Iran.

== Demographics ==
=== Population ===
At the time of the 2006 National Census, the village's population was 413 in 105 households. The following census in 2011 counted 579 people in 163 households. The 2016 census measured the population of the village as 540 people in 162 households.
