= Kondelan, Isfahan =

Village in Isfahan province, Iran

Kondelan Persian: كندلان
- Village
- Location within Iran
- Coordinates: 32°31′36″N 51°56′23″E
- Country: Iran
- Province: Isfahan
- County: Isfahan
- District: Central
- Rural District: Baraan-e Shomali

Population (2016)
  - Total: 924
- Time zone: UTC+3:30 (IRST)

Kondelan (Persian: كندلان) (Note: Also romanized as Kondelān; also known as Kondūlān and Ondelān) is a village in Baraan-e Shomali Rural District of the Central District in Isfahan County, Isfahan province, Iran.

== Demographics ==
=== Population ===
At the time of the 2006 National Census, the village's population was 881 in 231 households. The following census in 2011 counted 853 people in 259 households. The 2016 census measured the population of the village as 924 people in 294 households.
