= Kuy-e Rah-e Haq =

Village in Isfahan province, Iran

Kuy-e Rah-e Haq Persian: كوي راه حق
- Village
- Location within Iran
- Coordinates: 32°32′09″N 51°42′12″E
- Country: Iran
- Province: Isfahan
- County: Isfahan
- District: Central
- Rural District: Keraraj

Population (2016)
  - Total: 1,882
- Time zone: UTC+3:30 (IRST)

Kuy-e Rah-e Haq (Persian: كوي راه حق) (Note: Also romanized as Kūy-e Rāh-e Ḩaq) is a village in Keraraj Rural District of the Central District in Isfahan County, Isfahan province, Iran.

== Demographics ==
=== Population ===
At the time of the 2006 National Census, the village's population was 1,248 in 330 households. The following census in 2011 counted 1,613 people in 453 households. The 2016 census measured the population of the village as 1,882 people in 583 households.
