= Cheryan =

Village in Isfahan province, Iran

Cheryan Persian: چريان
- Village
- Location within Iran
- Coordinates: 32°34′05″N 51°45′12″E
- Country: Iran
- Province: Isfahan
- County: Isfahan
- District: Central
- Rural District: Keraraj

Population (2016)
  - Total: 2,272
- Time zone: UTC+3:30 (IRST)

Cheryan (Persian: چريان) (Note: Also romanized as Charīān, Charyān, and Cheryān; also known as Chīreyān) is a village in Keraraj Rural District of the Central District in Isfahan County, Isfahan province, Iran.

== Demographics ==
=== Population ===
At the time of the 2006 National Census, the village's population was 2,474 in 637 households. The following census in 2011 counted 2,788 people in 809 households. The 2016 census measured the population of the village as 2,272 people in 699 households.
