= Aminabad, Qahab-e Jonubi =

Village in Isfahan province, Iran

Aminabad Persian: امين اباد
- Village
- Location within Iran
- Coordinates: 32°37′51″N 51°52′42″E
- Country: Iran
- Province: Isfahan
- County: Isfahan
- District: Central
- Rural District: Qahab-e Jonubi

Population (2016)
  - Total: 252
- Time zone: UTC+3:30 (IRST)

Aminabad (Persian: امين اباد) (Note: Also romanized as Amīnābād; also known as Amīnābād-e Dovvom) is a village in Qahab-e Jonubi Rural District of the Central District in Isfahan County, Isfahan province, Iran.

== Demographics ==
=== Population ===
At the time of the 2006 National Census, the village's population was 437 in 108 households. The following census in 2011 counted 336 people in 96 households. The 2016 census measured the population of the village as 252 people in 79 households.
