= Hafshuye Mosque =

Former Shia mosque in Isfahan, Iran

- مسجد جامع هفت شویه
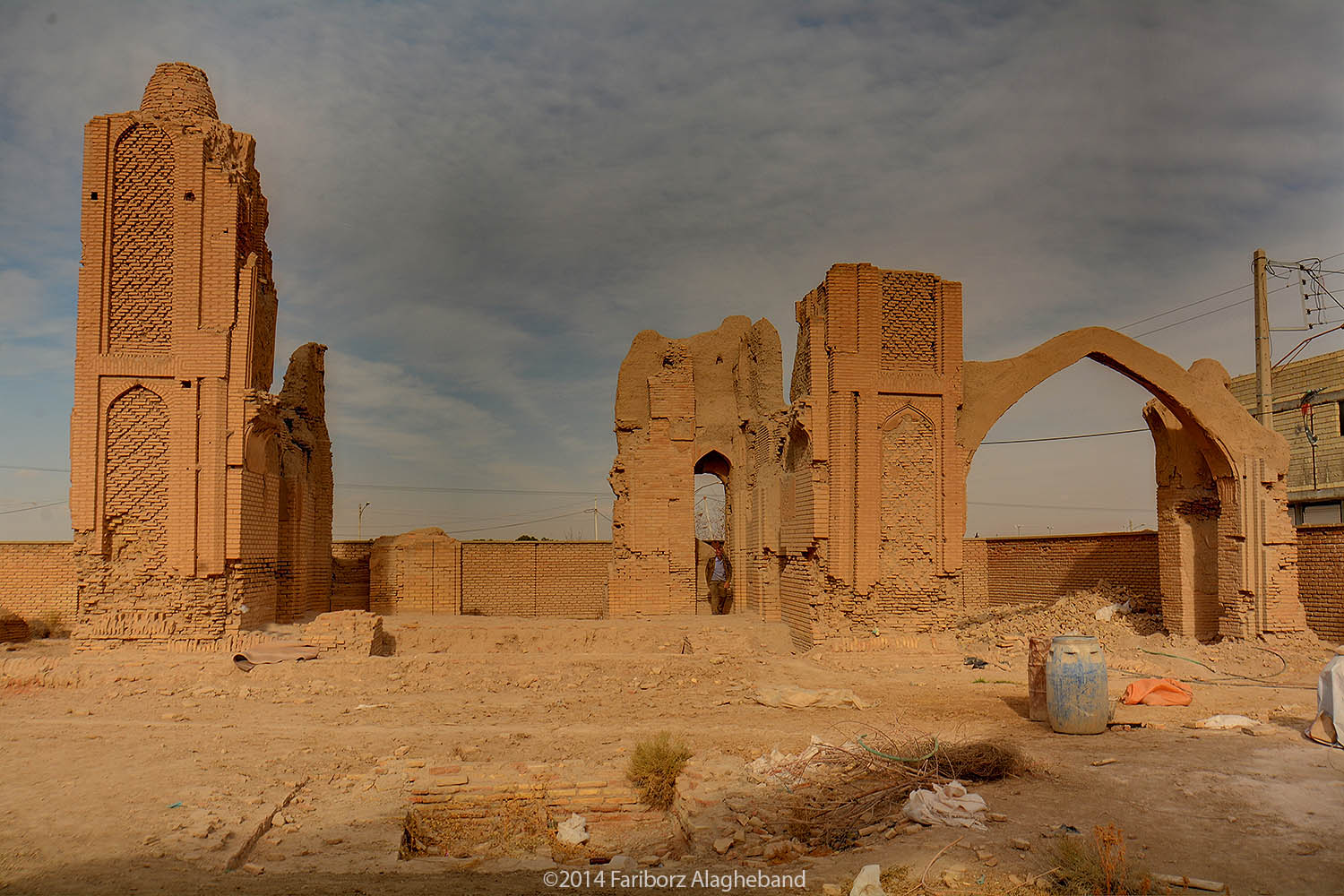
- The mosque ruins in 2014

- Location of the mosque ruins in Iran

Religion
- Affiliation: Shia Islam (former)
- Ecclesiastical or organisational status: Friday mosque (former)
- Status: Inactive (ruinous state)

Location
- Location: Haftshuyeh, Isfahan County, Isfahan province
- Country: Iran
- Coordinates: 32°42′13″N 51°47′14″E

Architecture
- Type: Mosque architecture
- Style: Seljuk (original structure); Ilkhanid (renovations)
- Completed: 11th century (original structure); 13th century (renovations)

Specifications
- Dome: One (since destroyed)
- Materials: Bricks; adobe

Iran National Heritage List
- Official name: Friday Mosque of Haftshuyeh
- Type: Friday Mosque
- Designated: 1963
- Reference no.: 430
- Conservation organization: Cultural Heritage, Handicrafts and Tourism Organization of Iran

The Hafshuye Mosque (Persian: مسجد جامع هفت شویه), also known as the Jameh Mosque of Haftshuyeh, is a former Shi'ite Friday mosque, in a ruinous condition, located in Haftshuyeh, in the province of Isfahan, Iran.

The mosque was added to the Iran National Heritage List on 6 March 1963, administered by the Cultural Heritage, Handicrafts and Tourism Organization of Iran.

The mosque was completed in the 11th century, during the Seljukid era, and was renovated, including the addition of the mihrab in the 13th century, during the Ilkhanid era. The structure has been built mainly with adobes, but its façade has been worked with bricks. The main part of the mosque, especially its dome, was destroyed and its wall was damaged.

== See also ==
- Shia Islam in Iran
- List of mosques in Iran
- List of historical structures in Isfahan
