= Jolmarz =

Village in Isfahan province, Iran

Jolmarz Persian: جلمرز
- Village
- Location within Iran
- Coordinates: 32°41′17″N 51°48′24″E
- Country: Iran
- Province: Isfahan
- County: Isfahan
- District: Central
- Rural District: Qahab-e Shomali

Population (2016)
  - Total: 452
- Time zone: UTC+3:30 (IRST)

Jolmarz (Persian: جلمرز) (Note: Also known as Jowl Marz) is a village in Qahab-e Shomali Rural District of the Central District in Isfahan County, Isfahan province, Iran.

== Demographics ==
=== Population ===
At the time of the 2006 National Census, the village's population was 407 in 112 households. The following census in 2011 counted 447 people in 135 households. The 2016 census measured the population of the village as 452 people in 139 households.
