= Jelvan =

Neighborhood in Isfahan province, Iran

Jelvan Persian: جلوان
- Neighborhood
- Location within Iran
- Coordinates: 32°42′45″N 51°45′09″E
- Country: Iran
- Province: Isfahan
- County: Isfahan
- District: Central
- City: Isfahan

Population (2011)
  - Total: 1,132
- Time zone: UTC+3:30 (IRST)

Jelvan (Persian: جلوان) (Note: Also romanized as Jelvān) is a neighborhood in the city of Isfahan in the Central District of Isfahan County, Isfahan province, Iran.

== Demographics ==
=== Population ===
At the time of the 2006 National Census, Jelvan's population was 1,083 in 286 households, when it was a village in Qahab-e Shomali Rural District. The following census in 2011 counted 1,132 people in 329 households. After the census, the village was annexed by the city of Isfahan.
