= Hasanabad, Qahab-e Jonubi =

Village in Isfahan province, Iran

Hasanabad Persian: حسن اباد
- Village
- Location within Iran
- Coordinates: 32°37′45″N 51°55′56″E
- Country: Iran
- Province: Isfahan
- County: Isfahan
- District: Central
- Rural District: Qahab-e Jonubi

Population (2016)
  - Total: 372
- Time zone: UTC+3:30 (IRST)

Hasanabad (Persian: حسن اباد) (Note: Also romanized as Ḩasanābād; also known as Ḩasanābād-e Qahāb and Ḩoseynābād-e Qohāb) is a village in Qahab-e Jonubi Rural District of the Central District in Isfahan County, Isfahan province, Iran.

== Demographics ==
=== Population ===
At the time of the 2006 National Census, the village's population was 600 in 146 households. The following census in 2011 counted 545 people in 156 households. The 2016 census measured the population of the village as 372 people in 121 households.
