= Kian, Isfahan =

Neighborhood in Isfahan province, Iran

Kian Persian: كيان
- Neighborhood
- Location within Iran
- Coordinates: 32°41′26″N 51°46′16″E
- Country: Iran
- Province: Isfahan
- County: Isfahan
- District: Central
- City: Isfahan

Population (2011)
  - Total: 450
- Time zone: UTC+3:30 (IRST)

Kian (Persian: كيان) (Note: Also romanized as Kīān) is a neighborhood in the city of Isfahan in the Central District of Isfahan County, Isfahan province, Iran.

== Demographics ==
=== Population ===
At the time of the 2006 National Census, Kian's population was 424 in 103 households, when it was a village in Qahab-e Shomali Rural District. The following census in 2011 counted 450 people in 117 households. After the census, the village was annexed by the city of Isfahan.
