= Rashenan =

Village in Isfahan province, Iran

Rashenan Persian: راشنان
- Village
- Location within Iran
- Coordinates: 32°33′54″N 51°46′14″E
- Country: Iran
- Province: Isfahan
- County: Isfahan
- District: Central
- Rural District: Keraraj

Population (2016)
  - Total: 1,759
- Time zone: UTC+3:30 (IRST)

Rashenan (Persian: راشنان) (Note: Also romanized as Rāshenān and Rāshnān) is a village in Keraraj Rural District of the Central District in Isfahan County, Isfahan province, Iran.

== Demographics ==
=== Population ===
At the time of the 2006 National Census, the village's population was 1,772 in 426 households. The following census in 2011 counted 1,879 people in 536 households. The 2016 census measured the population of the village as 1,759 people in 534 households.
