= Mahmudabad, Isfahan =

Neighborhood in Isfahan province, Iran

Mahmudabad Persian: محموداباد
- Neighborhood
- Location within Iran
- Coordinates: 32°46′29″N 51°34′30″E
- Country: Iran
- Province: Isfahan
- County: Isfahan
- District: Central
- City: Isfahan

Population (2011)
  - Total: 5,105
- Time zone: UTC+3:30 (IRST)

Mahmudabad (Persian: محموداباد) (Note: Also romanized as Maḩmūdābād) is a neighborhood in the city of Isfahan in the Central District of Isfahan County, Isfahan province, Iran. As a village, it was the capital of Mahmudabad Rural District.

== Demographics ==
=== Population ===
At the time of the 2006 National Census, Mahmudabad's population was 4,811 in 5,105 households, when it was a village in Mahmudabad Rural District. The following census in 2011 counted 5,105 people in 1,470 households. After the census, the village was annexed by the city of Isfahan.
