= Isfahan Babai Air Zone =

Village in Isfahan province, Iran

Isfahan Babai Air Zone Persian: منطقه هوایی بابایی اصفهان
- Village
- Location within Iran
- Coordinates: 32°46′36″N 51°50′41″E
- Country: Iran
- Province: Isfahan
- County: Isfahan
- District: Central
- Rural District: Qahab-e Shomali

Population (2016)
  - Total: 8,664
- Time zone: UTC+3:30 (IRST)

Isfahan Babai Air Zone (Persian: منطقه هوایی بابایی اصفهان) is a village in Qahab-e Shomali Rural District of the Central District in Isfahan County, Isfahan province, Iran.

== Demographics ==
=== Population ===
At the time of the 2006 National Census, the village's population was 9,236 in 2,819 households. The following census in 2011 counted 10,086 people in 2,636 households. The 2016 census measured the population of the locality as 8,664 people in 2,647 households, the most populous in its rural district.
