= Shahabad, Isfahan =

Village in Isfahan province, Iran

Shahabad Persian: شاه‌آباد
- Village
- Location within Iran
- Country: Iran
- Province: Isfahan
- County: Isfahan
- District: Central
- Rural District: Qahab-e Jonubi

Population (2016)
  - Total: 0
- Time zone: UTC+3:30 (IRST)

Shahabad (Persian: شاه‌آباد) (Note: Also romanized as Shāhābād) is a village in Qahab-e Jonubi Rural District of the Central District in Isfahan County, Isfahan province, Iran.

== Demographics ==
=== Population ===
At the time of the 2006 National Census, the village's population was 20 in four households. The following census in 2011 counted a population below the reporting threshold. The 2016 census measured the population of the village as zero.
