= Amorzeydabad =

Village in Isfahan province, Iran

Amorzeydabad Persian: امرزيداباد
- Village
- Location within Iran
- Coordinates: 32°42′21″N 51°52′13″E
- Country: Iran
- Province: Isfahan
- County: Isfahan
- District: Central
- Rural District: Qahab-e Shomali

Population (2016)
  - Total: 53
- Time zone: UTC+3:30 (IRST)

Amorzeydabad (Persian: امرزيداباد) (Note: Also romanized as Amorzeydābād, Āmorzeydābād, and Amr Zeydābād; also known as 'Āmarzābād, Āmorzābād, Amorzidehabad, Āmorzīdehābād, and Marzīdehābād) is a village in Qahab-e Shomali Rural District of the Central District in Isfahan County, Isfahan province, Iran.

== Demographics ==
=== Population ===
At the time of the 2006 National Census, the village's population was 96 in 22 households. The following census in 2011 counted 110 people in 39 households. The 2016 census measured the population of the village as 53 people in 22 households.
