= Yafran, Iran =

Village in Isfahan province, Iran

Yafran Persian: يفران
- Village
- Location within Iran
- Coordinates: 32°31′28″N 51°50′40″E
- Country: Iran
- Province: Isfahan
- County: Isfahan
- District: Central
- Rural District: Keraraj

Population (2016)
  - Total: 429
- Time zone: UTC+3:30 (IRST)

Yafran (Persian: يفران) (Note: Also romanized as Yafrān; also known as Yafrūn) is a village in Keraraj Rural District of the Central District in Isfahan County, Isfahan province, Iran.

== Demographics ==
=== Population ===
At the time of the 2006 National Census, the village's population was 540 in 143 households. The following census in 2011 counted 556 people in 160 households. The 2016 census measured the population of the village as 429 people in 133 households.
