= Qaleh-ye Torkan =

Village in Isfahan province, Iran

Qaleh-ye Torkan Persian: قلعه تركان
- Village
- Location within Iran
- Coordinates: 32°38′26″N 51°56′41″E
- Country: Iran
- Province: Isfahan
- County: Isfahan
- District: Central
- Rural District: Qahab-e Jonubi

Population (2016)
  - Total: 0
- Time zone: UTC+3:30 (IRST)

Qaleh-ye Torkan (Persian: قلعه تركان) (Note: Also romanized as Qal‘eh-ye Torkān) is a village in Qahab-e Jonubi Rural District of the Central District in Isfahan County, Isfahan province, Iran.

== Demographics ==
=== Population ===
At the time of the 2006 National Census, the village's population was 151 in 30 households. The following census in 2011 counted 46 people in 10 households. The 2016 census measured the population of the village as zero.
