= Kuhan, Isfahan =

Village in Isfahan province, Iran

Kuhan Persian: كوهان
- Village
- Location within Iran
- Coordinates: 32°33′24″N 51°56′28″E
- Country: Iran
- Province: Isfahan
- County: Isfahan
- District: Central
- Rural District: Baraan-e Shomali

Population (2016)
  - Total: 1,351
- Time zone: UTC+3:30 (IRST)

Kuhan (Persian: كوهان) (Note: Also romanized as Kūhān; also known as Kūhānestān) is a village in Baraan-e Shomali of the Central District in Isfahan County, Isfahan province, Iran.

== Demographics ==
=== Population ===
At the time of the 2006 National Census, the village's population was 1,617 in 409 households. The following census in 2011 counted 1,294 people in 391 households. The 2016 census measured the population of the village as 1,351 people in 411 households.
