= Kabutarabad =

Village in Isfahan province, Iran

Kabutarabad Persian: كبوتراباد
- Village
- Location within Iran
- Coordinates: 32°29′52″N 51°49′35″E
- Country: Iran
- Province: Isfahan
- County: Isfahan
- District: Central
- Rural District: Keraraj

Population (2016)
  - Total: 1,414
- Time zone: UTC+3:30 (IRST)

Kabutarabad (Persian: كبوتراباد) (Note: Also romanized as Kabūtarābād) is a village in Keraraj Rural District of the Central District in Isfahan County, Isfahan province, Iran.

The Iranian comedy film, Jafar Khan Is Back from the West (1985), was partially filmed in this village.

== Demographics ==
=== Population ===
At the time of the 2006 National Census, the village's population was 1,233 in 342 households. The following census in 2011 counted 1,271 people in 396 households. The 2016 census measured the population of the village as 1,414 people in 434 households.
