= Gar mosque and minaret =

Former Shia mosque and minaret in Isfahan, Iran

Mosque and Minaret of Gar مسجد و منر گار
- Location of the monument in Iran

Religion
- Affiliation: Shia Islam (former)
- Ecclesiastical or organisational status: Friday mosque and minaret
- Status: Inactive (mosque in partial ruins); Active (minaret)

Location
- Location: Gar, Isfahan province
- Country: Iran
- Coordinates: 32°31′17″N 51°50′25″E

Architecture
- Architect: Abolghassem Ahmad Banna (minaret)
- Type: Persian architecture
- Style: Seljuk; Ilkhanid
- Completed: 1121 CE (minaret)

Specifications
- Minaret: One
- Materials: Bricks; stucco; tiles

Iran National Heritage List
- Official name: Mosque and Minaret of Gar
- Type: Mosque/Minaret
- Designated: 1937
- Reference no.: 270
- Conservation organization: Cultural Heritage, Handicrafts and Tourism Organization of Iran

The Gar mosque and minaret, also known as the Monar-e-Ghar, comprise the remnants of a former Shi'ite Friday mosque, in a partial ruinous state, and an intact minaret, located in the village of Gar, in the province of Isfahan, Iran.

== Overview ==
=== Mosque ===
The former mosque was completed during the Ilkhanid age, and its remnants comprise the former mihrab, which was decorated with stuccoes. The former mosque building is in ruins, with remnants of a wall around the mosque, which probably belongs to a structure built prior to the mosque. There does not appear to be a natural connection between the former mosque building in the north and the section to the south. For this reason, the part with the minaret on the northern side probably existed before the construction of the mosque.

The building's mihrab has suffered significant damage. Although a part of the inscription is legible, it is not possible to draw any conclusions from it. There is a name, Rashideddin Muhammad Kamil Ahmed bin lsmail, written on a destroyed panel on the wall inside the room, and a date that includes the number 6.

The south section consists of a domed bay with a square plan. Bricks of varying sizes were used for the section in front of the mihrab. These bricks came from the previous building. Decorative elements consist of cut bricks, interconnecting moldings, brick buttresses, bond courses and elements of high relief with blue and red painted glaze.

By analysis of the architectural ornamentation, Wilber dates the building from 1300 CE, at the earliest. He noted a definite similarity between the decorative panels on the mihrab and the walls, and also pointed out the difference in the shapes of some of the letters. He explains this by stating that the decorative panels on the building were placed after the building was constructed. It is most likely that the square plan room was added to the building in the Seljuk period.

The outer part of the wall surface is preserved only at the northern edge. There are small columns with slight angles to the west of the room's partial and laid-up tile surfaces. The surfaces adjacent to the partial have large, detailed bond patterns. The difference between the size of the surfaces and the way they are connected indicates that there was an earlier building.

The pillars are covered with stucco. These include the pillars of the domed bay in front of the mihrab and inner faces of the arches between the pillars. Vegetal and rumi (split-leaf) motifs were preferred.

=== Minaret ===
The minaret is located 3 metres (9.8 ft) north of the former mosque building. According to its inscription at its base, the minaret was built by Abolghassem ebn-e Ahmad and completed in 1121 CE, during the Seljuq era. The minaret is in a relatively good condition and is decorated with square Kufic inscriptions that are carved into the brick shaft.

== See also ==
- Shia Islam in Iran
- List of mosques in Iran
