= Mohammadabad, Qahab-e Jonubi (East) =

Village in Isfahan province, Iran

Mohammadabad Persian: محمداباد
- Village
- Location within Iran
- Coordinates: 32°40′26″N 51°56′31″E
- Country: Iran
- Province: Isfahan
- County: Isfahan
- District: Central
- Rural District: Qahab-e Jonubi

Population (2016)
  - Total: 205
- Time zone: UTC+3:30 (IRST)

Mohammadabad (Persian: محمداباد) (Note: Also romanized as Moḩammadābād) is a village in Qahab-e Jonubi Rural District of the Central District in Isfahan County, Isfahan province, Iran.

== Demographics ==
=== Population ===
At the time of the 2006 National Census, the village's population was 2,169 in 451 households. The following census in 2011 counted 1,186 people in 238 households. The 2016 census measured the population of the village as 205 people in 63 households.
