= Margh-e Gachi =

Village in Isfahan province, Iran

Margh-e Gachi Persian: مرغ گچي
- Village
- Location within Iran
- Coordinates: 32°30′27″N 51°42′48″E
- Country: Iran
- Province: Isfahan
- County: Isfahan
- District: Central
- Rural District: Keraraj

Population (2016)
  - Total: 351
- Time zone: UTC+3:30 (IRST)

Margh-e Gachi (Persian: مرغ گچي) (Note: Also romanized as Margh-e Gachī; also known as Margh, Marq, and Morgh) is a village in Keraraj Rural District of the Central District in Isfahan County, Isfahan province, Iran.

== Demographics ==
=== Population ===
At the time of the 2006 National Census, the village's population was 692 in 193 households. The following census in 2011 counted 749 people in 239 households. The 2016 census measured the population of the village as 351 people in 118 households.
