= Zamanabad, Isfahan =

Village in Isfahan province, Iran

Zamanabad Persian: زمان اباد
- Village
- Location within Iran
- Coordinates: 32°43′04″N 51°48′42″E
- Country: Iran
- Province: Isfahan
- County: Isfahan
- District: Central
- Rural District: Qahab-e Shomali

Population (2016)
  - Total: 126
- Time zone: UTC+3:30 (IRST)

Zamanabad (Persian: زمان اباد) (Note: Also romanized as Zamānābād) is a village in Qahab-e Shomali Rural District of the Central District in Isfahan County, Isfahan province, Iran.

== Demographics ==
=== Population ===
At the time of the 2006 National Census, the village's population was 98 in 28 households. The following census in 2011 counted 142 people in 43 households. The 2016 census measured the population of the village as 126 people in 38 households.
