= Dashti, Isfahan =

Village in Isfahan province, Iran

Dashti Persian: دشتي
- Village
- Location within Iran
- Coordinates: 32°31′36″N 51°47′33″E
- Country: Iran
- Province: Isfahan
- County: Isfahan
- District: Central
- Rural District: Keraraj

Population (2016)
  - Total: 2,725
- Time zone: UTC+3:30 (IRST)

Dashti (Persian: دشتي) (Note: Also romanized as Dashtī; also known as Dastī) is a village in, and the capital of, Keraraj Rural District in the Central District of Isfahan County, Isfahan province, Iran.

== Demographics ==
=== Population ===
At the time of the 2006 National Census, the village's population was 2,730 in 686 households. The following census in 2011 counted 3,085 people in 887 households. The 2016 census measured the population of the village as 2,725 people in 815 households.
