= Monshian =

Village in Isfahan province, Iran

Monshian Persian: منشيان
- Village
- Location within Iran
- Coordinates: 32°33′12″N 51°52′12″E
- Country: Iran
- Province: Isfahan
- County: Isfahan
- District: Central
- Rural District: Baraan-e Shomali

Population (2016)
  - Total: 1,814
- Time zone: UTC+3:30 (IRST)

Monshian (Persian: منشيان) (Note: Also romanized as Monshīān; also known as Mīshān, Mīshūn, and Mīsūn) is a village in Baraan-e Shomali Rural District of the Central District in Isfahan County, Isfahan province, Iran.

== Demographics ==
=== Population ===
At the time of the 2006 National Census, the village's population was 1,672 in 411 households. The following census in 2011 counted 1,991 people in 559 households. The 2016 census measured the population of the village as 1,814 people in 560 households.
