= Raddan =

Neighborhood in Isfahan province, Iran

Raddan Persian: ردان
- Neighborhood
- Location within Iran
- Coordinates: 32°35′42″N 51°45′17″E
- Country: Iran
- Province: Isfahan
- County: Isfahan
- District: Central
- City: Isfahan

Population (2011)
  - Total: 1,510
- Time zone: UTC+3:30 (IRST)

Raddan (Persian: ردان) (Note: Also romanized as Radān and Raddān; also known as Rādān) is a neighborhood in the city of Isfahan in the Central District of Isfahan County, Isfahan province, Iran.

== Demographics ==
=== Population ===
At the time of the 2006 National Census, Raddan's population was 1,597 in 425 households, when it was a village in Keraraj Rural District. The following census in 2011 counted 1,510 people in 457 households. After the census, the village was annexed by the city of Isfahan.
