= Kalmanjan =

Village in Isfahan province, Iran

Kalmanjan Persian: كلمنجان
- Village
- Location within Iran
- Coordinates: 32°40′08″N 51°54′56″E
- Country: Iran
- Province: Isfahan
- County: Isfahan
- District: Central
- Rural District: Qahab-e Jonubi

Population (2016)
  - Total: 312
- Time zone: UTC+3:30 (IRST)

Kalmanjan (Persian: كلمنجان) (Note: Also romanized as Kalmanjān) is a village in Qahab-e Jonubi Rural District of the Central District in Isfahan County, Isfahan province, Iran.

== Demographics ==
=== Population ===
At the time of the 2006 National Census, the village's population was 609 in 135 households. The following census in 2011 counted 358 people in 88 households. The 2016 census measured the population of the village as 312 people in 79 households.
