= Dastja =

Village in Isfahan province, Iran

Dastja Persian: دستجا
- Village
- Location within Iran
- Coordinates: 32°32′18″N 51°56′50″E
- Country: Iran
- Province: Isfahan
- County: Isfahan
- District: Central
- Rural District: Baraan-e Shomali

Population (2016)
  - Total: 797
- Time zone: UTC+3:30 (IRST)

Dastja (Persian: دستجا) (Note: Also romanized as Dastejā, Dastjā, and Dastjā’; also known as Dastjāh) is a village in, and the capital of, Baraan-e Shomali Rural District in the Central District of Isfahan County, Isfahan province, Iran.

== Demographics ==
=== Population ===
At the time of the 2006 National Census, the village's population was 1,704 in 374 households. The following census in 2011 counted 1,159 people in 310 households. The 2016 census measured the population of the village as 797 people in 248 households.
