= Shahrak-e Shahid Montazeri =

Neighborhood in Isfahan province, Iran

Shahrak-e Shahid Montazeri Persian: شهرك شهيدمنتظري
- Neighborhood
- Location within Iran
- Coordinates: 32°46′13″N 51°33′13″E
- Country: Iran
- Province: Isfahan
- County: Isfahan
- District: Central
- City: Isfahan

Population (2011)
  - Total: 2,518
- Time zone: UTC+3:30 (IRST)

Shahrak-e Shahid Montazeri (Persian: شهرك شهيدمنتظري) (Note: Also romanized as Shahrak-e Shahīd Montaz̧erī; also known as Shahrak-e Shahīd Moḩammad Montaz̧erī) is a neighborhood in the city of Isfahan in the Central District of Isfahan County, Isfahan province, Iran.

== Demographics ==
=== Population ===
At the time of the 2006 National Census, Shahrak-e Shahid Montazeri's population was 2,993 in 741 households, when it was a village in Mahmudabad Rural District. The following census in 2011 counted 2,518 people in 686 households. After the census, the village was annexed by the city of Isfahan.
