= Fizadan =

Neighborhood in Isfahan province, Iran

Fizadan Persian: فيزادان
- Neighborhood
- Location within Iran
- Coordinates: 32°35′55″N 51°45′28″E
- Country: Iran
- Province: Isfahan
- County: Isfahan
- District: Central
- City: Isfahan

Population (2011)
  - Total: 818
- Time zone: UTC+3:30 (IRST)

Fizadan (Persian: فيزادان) (Note: Also romanized as Fīzādān; also known as Fāzādān, Pazādān, and Pīzādān) is a neighborhood in the city of Isfahan in the Central District of Isfahan County, Isfahan province, Iran.

== Demographics ==
=== Population ===
At the time of the 2006 National Census, Fizadan's population was 792 in 227 households, when it was a village in Keraraj Rural District. The following census in 2011 counted 818 people in 264 households. After the census, the village was annexed by the city of Isfahan.
