= Bersian =

Village in Isfahan province, Iran

Bersian Persian: برسيان
- Village
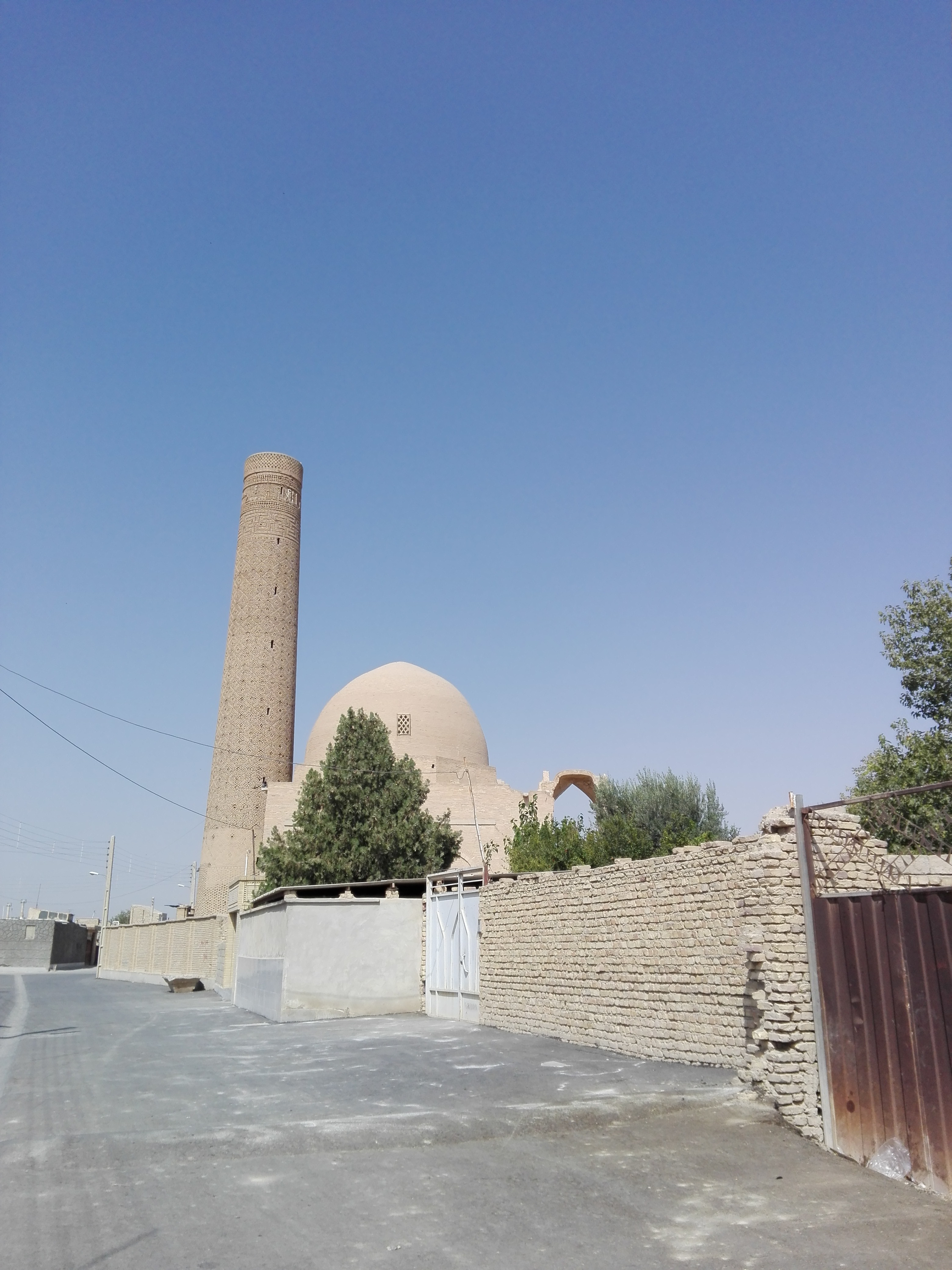
- Bersian mosque in 2018

- Location within Iran
- Coordinates: 32°31′18″N 52°01′50″E
- Country: Iran
- Province: Isfahan
- County: Isfahan
- District: Central
- Rural District: Baraan-e Shomali

Population (2016)
  - Total: 1,955
- Time zone: UTC+3:30 (IRST)

Bersian (Persian: برسيان) (Note: Also romanized as Barsiyān, Berseyān, Bersīān, and Bersīyān; also known as Bisiyūn and Bīzyūn) is a village in Baraan-e Shomali Rural District of the Central District in Isfahan County, Isfahan province, Iran.

== Demographics ==
=== Population ===
At the time of the 2006 National Census, the village's population was 1,750 in 436 households. The following census in 2011 counted 1,813 people in 548 households. The 2016 census measured the population of the village as 1,955 people in 600 households. It was the most populous village in its rural district.
