= Andalan =

Village in Isfahan province, Iran

Andalan Persian: اندلان
- Village
- Location within Iran
- Coordinates: 32°29′48″N 51°56′11″E
- Country: Iran
- Province: Isfahan
- County: Isfahan
- District: Central
- Rural District: Baraan-e Jonubi

Population (2016)
  - Total: 1,215
- Time zone: UTC+3:30 (IRST)

Andalan (Persian: اندلان) (Note: Also romanized as Andalān, Andelān, and ‘Endelān) is a village in Baraan-e Jonubi Rural District of the Central District in Isfahan County, Isfahan province, Iran.

== Demographics ==
=== Population ===
At the time of the 2006 National Census, the village's population was 1,141 in 313 households. The following census in 2011 counted 1,176 people in 354 households. The 2016 census measured the population of the village as 1,215 people in 377 households.
