= Shahshahani =

Shahshahani (Persian: شهشهانی) is a surname. Notable people with the surname include:

- Azadeh N. Shahshahani (born 1979), American human rights attorney
- Hossein Shahshahani (1895–1962), Iranian judge and scholar
- Siavash Shahshahani (born 1942), Iranian mathematician
