= Baharan, Isfahan =

Village in Isfahan province, Iran

Baharan Persian: بهاران
- Village
- Location within Iran
- Coordinates: 32°41′19″N 51°47′21″E
- Country: Iran
- Province: Isfahan
- County: Isfahan
- District: Central
- Rural District: Qahab-e Shomali

Population (2016)
  - Total: 732
- Time zone: UTC+3:30 (IRST)

Baharan (Persian: بهاران) (Note: Also romanized as Bahārān; also known as Parun (‌پارون)) is a village in Qahab-e Shomali Rural District of the Central District in Isfahan County, Isfahan province, Iran.

== Demographics ==
=== Population ===
At the time of the 2006 National Census, the village's population was 676 in 189 households. The following census in 2011 counted 845 people in 264 households. The 2016 census measured the population of the village as 732 people in 225 households.
