= Denarat =

Neighborhood in Isfahan province, Iran

Denarat Persian: دنارت
- Neighborhood
- Location within Iran
- Coordinates: 32°36′45″N 51°44′40″E
- Country: Iran
- Province: Isfahan
- County: Isfahan
- District: Central
- City: Isfahan

Population (2011)
  - Total: 2,120
- Time zone: UTC+3:30 (IRST)

Denarat (Persian: دنارت) (Note: Also romanized as Danārat, Denārat, and Denārt) is a neighborhood in the city of Isfahan in the Central District of Isfahan County, Isfahan province, Iran.

== Demographics ==
=== Population ===
At the time of the 2006 National Census, Denarat's population was 2,243 in 559 households, when it was a village in Keraraj Rural District. The following census in 2011 counted 2,120 people in 596 households. After the census, the village was annexed by the city of Isfahan.
