= Hatmabad =

Village in Isfahan province, Iran

Hatmabad Persian: حتم اباد
- Village
- Location within Iran
- Coordinates: 32°41′08″N 51°52′19″E
- Country: Iran
- Province: Isfahan
- County: Isfahan
- District: Central
- Rural District: Qahab-e Shomali

Population (2016)
  - Total: 476
- Time zone: UTC+3:30 (IRST)

Hatmabad (Persian: حتم اباد) (Note: Also romanized as Ḩatmābād, Hatmābād, and Hotanābād; also known as Khatmābād) is a village in Qahab-e Shomali Rural District of the Central District in Isfahan County, Isfahan province, Iran.

== Demographics ==
=== Population ===
At the time of the 2006 National Census, the village's population was 428 in 119 households. The following census in 2011 counted 535 people in 164 households. The 2016 census measured the population of the village as 476 people in 157 households.
