= Borkan =

Village in Isfahan province, Iran

Borkan Persian: بركان
- Village
- Location within Iran
- Coordinates: 32°30′54″N 51°54′53″E
- Country: Iran
- Province: Isfahan
- County: Isfahan
- District: Central
- Rural District: Baraan-e Jonubi

Population (2016)
  - Total: 1,686
- Time zone: UTC+3:30 (IRST)

Borkan (Persian: بركان) (Note: Also romanized as Borakān and Borkān; also known as Būrkūr) is a village in Baraan-e Jonubi Rural District of the Central District in Isfahan County, Isfahan province, Iran.

== Demographics ==
=== Population ===
At the time of the 2006 National Census, the village's population was 1,477 in 446 households. The following census in 2011 counted 1,504 people in 502 households. The 2016 census measured the population of the village as 1,686 people in 556 households.
