= Kabjavan =

Village in Isfahan province, Iran

Kabjavan Persian: كبجوان
- Village
- Location within Iran
- Coordinates: 32°32′42″N 51°45′49″E
- Country: Iran
- Province: Isfahan
- County: Isfahan
- District: Central
- Rural District: Keraraj

Population (2016)
  - Total: 456
- Time zone: UTC+3:30 (IRST)

Kabjavan (Persian: كبجوان) (Note: Also romanized as Kabjavān) is a village in Keraraj Rural District of the Central District in Isfahan County, Isfahan province, Iran.

== Demographics ==
=== Population ===
At the time of the 2006 National Census, the village's population was 545 in 128 households. The following census in 2011 counted 440 people in 125 households. The 2016 census measured the population of the village as 456 people in 141 households.
