= Mahmudabad Rural District =

Mahmudabad Rural District (Persian: دهستان محمودآباد) may refer to:

- Mahmudabad Rural District (Parsabad County), Ardabil province
- Mahmudabad Rural District (Isfahan Province)
- Mahmudabad Rural District (Shahin Dezh County), West Azerbaijan province
