= Ruran =

Village in Isfahan province, Iran

Ruran Persian: روران
- Village
- Location within Iran
- Coordinates: 32°28′30″N 51°53′37″E
- Country: Iran
- Province: Isfahan
- County: Isfahan
- District: Central
- Rural District: Baraan-e Jonubi

Population (2016)
  - Total: 2,083
- Time zone: UTC+3:30 (IRST)

Ruran (Persian: روران) (Note: Also romanized as Rūrān) is a village in Baraan-e Jonubi Rural District of the Central District in Isfahan County, Isfahan province, Iran.

== Demographics ==
=== Population ===
At the time of the 2006 National Census, the village's population was 1,942 in 547 households. The following census in 2011 counted 1,999 people in 620 households. The 2016 census measured the population of the village as 2,083 people in 642 households, the most village in its rural district.
