= Qaleh-ye Chum =

Village in Isfahan province, Iran

Qaleh-ye Chum Persian: قلعه چوم
- Village
- Location within Iran
- Coordinates: 32°35′00″N 51°45′57″E
- Country: Iran
- Province: Isfahan
- County: Isfahan
- District: Central
- Rural District: Keraraj

Population (2016)
  - Total: 762
- Time zone: UTC+3:30 (IRST)

Qaleh-ye Chum (Persian: قلعه چوم) (Note: Also romanized as Qal‘eh-ye Chūm) is a village in Keraraj Rural District of the Central District in Isfahan County, Isfahan province, Iran.

== Demographics ==
=== Population ===
At the time of the 2006 National Census, the village's population was 737 in 201 households. The following census in 2011 counted 907 people in 280 households. The 2016 census measured the population of the village as 762 people in 251 households.
