= Shahrak-e Bakhtiar Dasht =

Neighborhood in Isfahan province, Iran

Shahrak-e Bakhtiar Dasht Persian: شهرك بختياردشت
- Neighborhood
- Location within Iran
- Coordinates: 32°45′35″N 51°32′23″E
- Country: Iran
- Province: Isfahan
- County: Isfahan
- District: Central
- City: Isfahan

Population (2011)
  - Total: 718
- Time zone: UTC+3:30 (IRST)

Shahrak-e Bakhtiar Dasht (Persian: شهرك بختياردشت) (Note: Also romanized as Shahrak-e Bakhtīār Dasht) is a neighborhood in the city of Isfahan in the Central District of Isfahan County, Isfahan province, Iran.

== Demographics ==
=== Population ===
At the time of the 2006 National Census, Shahrak-e Bakhtiar Dasht's population was 327 in 90 households, when it was a village in Mahmudabad Rural District. The following census in 2011 counted 718 people in 156 households. After the census, the village was annexed by the city of Isfahan.
