= Karchegan =

Village in Isfahan province, Iran

Karchegan Persian: كرچگان
- Village
- Location within Iran
- Coordinates: 32°31′47″N 51°52′09″E
- Country: Iran
- Province: Isfahan
- County: Isfahan
- District: Central
- Rural District: Keraraj

Population (2016)
  - Total: 883
- Time zone: UTC+3:30 (IRST)

Karchegan (Persian: كرچگان) (Note: Also romanized as Karchegān) is a village in Keraraj Rural District of the Central District in Isfahan County, Isfahan province, Iran.

== Demographics ==
=== Population ===
At the time of the 2006 National Census, the village's population was 781 in 179 households. The following census in 2011 counted 918 people in 249 households. The 2016 census measured the population of the village as 883 people in 250 households.
