= Chengan =

Neighborhood in Isfahan province, Iran

Changan Persian: چنگان
- Neighborhood
- Location within Iran
- Coordinates: 32°40′32″N 51°46′25″E
- Country: Iran
- Province: Isfahan
- County: Isfahan
- District: Central
- City: Isfahan

Population (2011)
  - Total: 40
- Time zone: UTC+3:30 (IRST)

Changan (Persian: چنگان) (Note: Also romanized as Changan, Changān, and Changān) is a neighborhood in the city of Isfahan in the Central District of Isfahan County, Isfahan province, Iran.

== Demographics ==
=== Population ===
At the time of the 2006 National Census, Changan's population was 159 in 43 households, when it was a village in Qahab-e Jonubi Rural District. The following census in 2011 counted 40 people in 15 households. After the census, the village was annexed by the city of Isfahan.
