= Pileh Varan =

Village in Isfahan province, Iran

Pileh Varan Persian: پيله وران
- Village
- Location within Iran
- Coordinates: 32°30′30″N 51°54′31″E
- Country: Iran
- Province: Isfahan
- County: Isfahan
- District: Central
- Rural District: Baraan-e Jonubi

Population (2016)
  - Total: 2,065
- Time zone: UTC+3:30 (IRST)

Pileh Varan (Persian: پيله وران) (Note: Also romanized as Pīleh Varān) is a village in Baraan-e Jonubi Rural District of the Central District in Isfahan County, Isfahan province, Iran.

== Demographics ==
=== Population ===
At the time of the 2006 National Census, the village's population was 1,377 in 362 households. The following census in 2011 counted 1,382 people in 417 households. The 2016 census measured the population of the village as 2,065 people in 602 households.
