= Eziran =

Village in Isfahan province, Iran

Eziran Persian: ازيران
- Village
- Location within Iran
- Coordinates: 32°29′42″N 51°54′29″E
- Country: Iran
- Province: Isfahan
- County: Isfahan
- District: Central
- Rural District: Baraan-e Jonubi

Population (2016)
  - Total: 1,032
- Time zone: UTC+3:30 (IRST)

Eziran (Persian: ازيران) (Note: Also romanized as Ezīrān; also known as Azrān) is a village in Baraan-e Jonubi Rural District of the Central District in Isfahan County, Isfahan province, Iran.

== Demographics ==
=== Population ===
At the time of the 2006 National Census, the village's population was 1,170 in 279 households. The following census in 2011 counted 1,187 people in 320 households. The 2016 census measured the population of the village as 1,032 people in 308 households.
