= Maziar Partow =

Iranian cinematographer

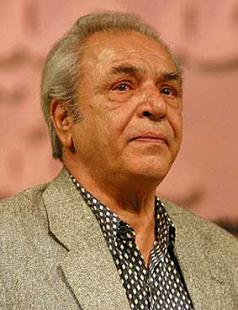
- Maziar Partow honored in the 100th year Iranian Cinematography festival.
- Born: مازیار پرتو; November 13, 1933; Tehran, Iran
- Died: January 22, 2014 (aged 80); California, U.S.
- Occupation: Cinematographer
- Years active: 1960–2014
- Spouse: Ghamar Fakhamy
- Relatives: Vishka Asayesh (niece)

Maziar Partow (Persian: مازیار پرتو; November 13, 1933 – January 22, 2014) was one of the first Iranian cinematographers and had worked as a cameraman on numerous Iranian films. He directed a few movies and edited several more, and was most well known by his title as Director of Photography.

Partow died January 22, 2014, in California.

== Filmography ==
1. Ruz-e vaghe'e (1995)... a.k.a. The Fateful Day
2. Avinar (1991)
3. Bazgasht-e ghahraman (1990)... a.k.a. Return of the Hero
4. Jostejoogar (1989)... a.k.a. The Searcher
5. Jafar Khan az farang bargashte (1985)
6. Kafsh-haye Mirza Norooz (1985)... a.k.a. Mirza Norooz's Shoes
7. Toghian (1985)
8. Barzakhiha (1982)
9. Zemzeme-ye mohabbat (1980)
10. Gorg-e bizar (1973)
11. Baba Shamal (1971)
12. Toughi (1971)
13. Shahr-e hert (1970)
14. Gheisar (1969)
15. Khaneye kenare darya (1969)
16. Zan-e khoon-asham (1967)
17. Hashem khan (1966)
18. The Poppy Is Also a Flower (1966)
