= Haftshuiyeh =

Village in Isfahan province, Iran

Haftshuiyeh Persian: هفت شوئيه
- Village
- Location within Iran
- Coordinates: 32°42′03″N 51°47′20″E
- Country: Iran
- Province: Isfahan
- County: Isfahan
- District: Central
- Rural District: Qahab-e Shomali

Population (2016)
  - Total: 1,336
- Time zone: UTC+3:30 (IRST)

The remains of the mud-brick and fired-brick Haftshuyeh Jameh Mosque, registered as a monument in 1963, feature a 700-year-old stucco mihrab that has survived the decay of the surrounding Seljuk-era structure. Founded in the 11th century and later restored under the Muzaffarid dynasty in the mid-14th century, the two-iwan mosque stands in the village of Haftshuyeh and is characteristic of the Ilkhanid stucco era.

Haftshuiyeh (Persian: هفت شوئيه) (Note: Also romanized as Haft Shū’īyeh, Haft Shūyeh, Haftshū’īyeh, and Haftshūyeh) is a village in Qahab-e Shomali Rural District of the Central District in Isfahan County, Isfahan province, Iran.

== Demographics ==
=== Population ===
At the time of the 2006 National Census, the village's population was 1,248 in 332 households. The following census in 2011 counted 1,282 people in 403 households. The 2016 census measured the population of the village as 1,336 people in 407 households.
