= Esfehanak, Isfahan =

Village in Isfahan province, Iran

Esfehanak Persian: اصفهانک
- Village
- Location within Iran
- Coordinates: 32°33′45″N 51°44′49″E
- Country: Iran
- Province: Isfahan
- County: Isfahan
- District: Central
- Rural District: Keraraj

Population (2016)
  - Total: 4,414
- Time zone: UTC+3:30 (IRST)

Esfehanak (Persian: اصفهانك) (Note: Also romanized as Eşfahānak and Eşfehānak) is a village in Keraraj Rural District of the Central District in Isfahan County, Isfahan province, Iran.

== Demographics ==
=== Population ===
At the time of the 2006 National Census, the village's population was 3,860 in 947 households. The following census in 2011 counted 4,717 people in 1,310 households. The 2016 census measured the population of the village as 4,414 people in 1,318 households, the most populous in its rural district.
