= Khvorasgan =

Neighborhood in Isfahan province, Iran

Khvorasgan Persian: خوراسگان
- Neighborhood
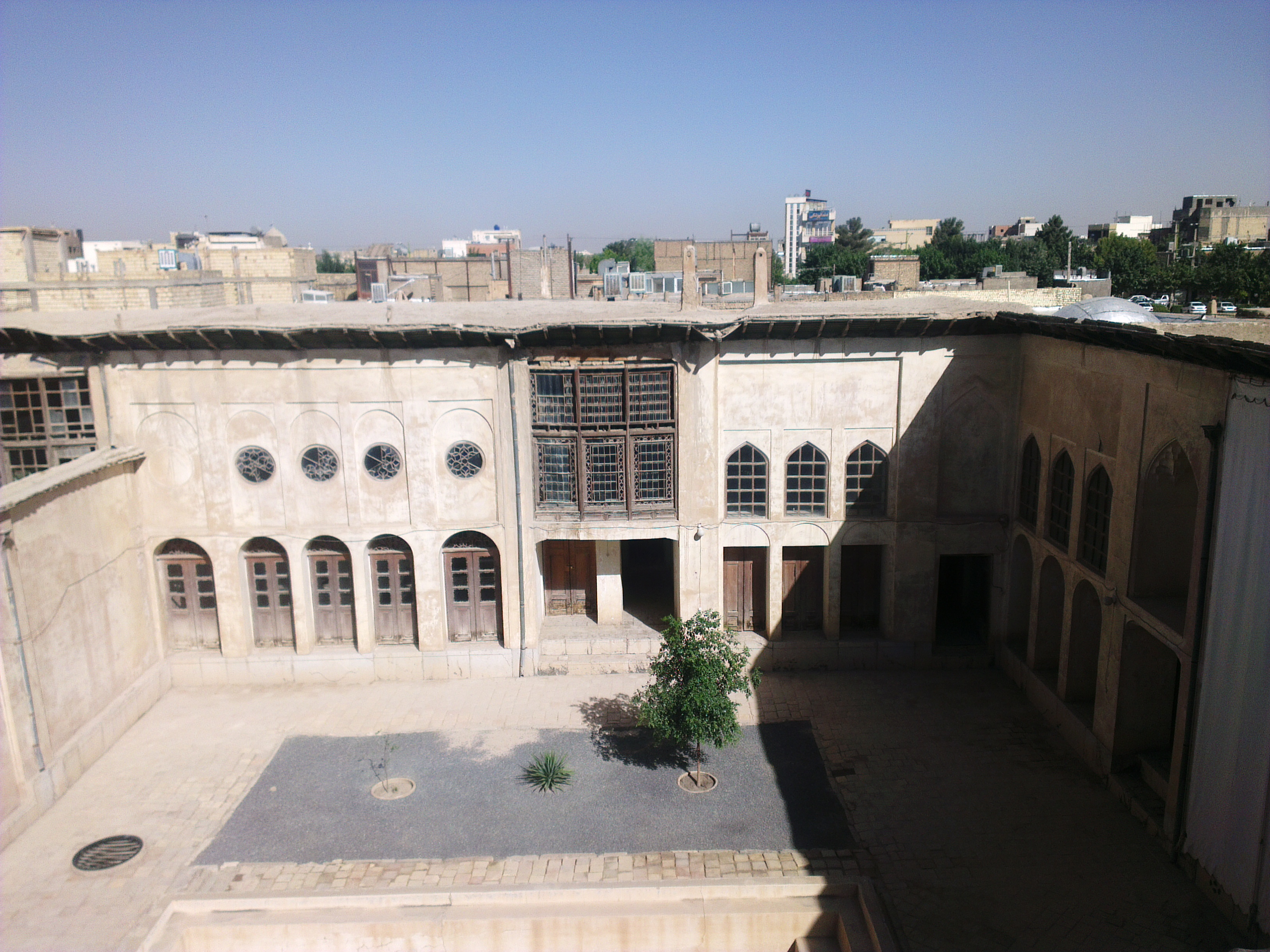
- Emarat Khan in Khvorasgan

- Location within Iran
- Coordinates: 32°39′10″N 51°45′32″E
- Country: Iran
- Province: Isfahan
- County: Isfahan
- City: Isfahan

Population (2011)
  - Total: 97,167
- Time zone: UTC+3:30 (IRST)

Khvorasgan (Persian: خوراسگان) (Note: Also romanized as Khvorāsgān; also known as Khavrāskān, Khorasgun, Khorasqān, and Khurāsqān) is a neighborhood in the city of Isfahan in the Central District of Isfahan County, Isfahan province, Iran.

== Demographics ==
=== Population ===
At the time of the 2006 National Census, Khvorasgan's population was 86,063 in 23,381 households, when it was a city in the Central District. The following census in 2011 counted 97,167 people in 29,340 households.

Khvorasgan was annexed by the city of Isfahan in 2012.

== See also ==
Media related to Khorasgan at Wikimedia Commons
