= Ziar, Isfahan =

City in Isfahan province, Iran

Ziar Persian: زيار
- City
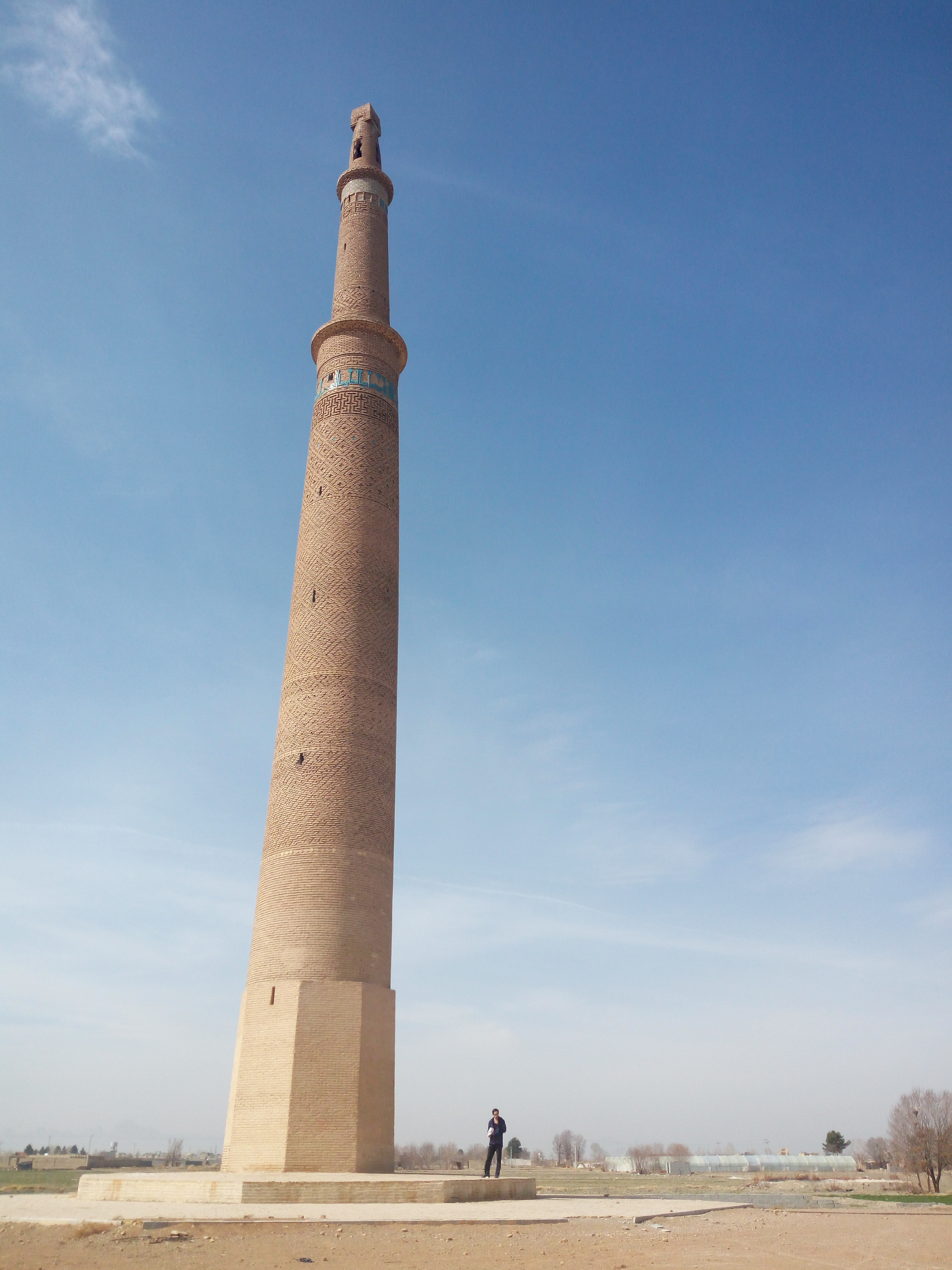
- Ziyar Minaret, a historical landmark in Ziar

- Location within Iran
- Coordinates: 32°30′33″N 51°56′18″E
- Country: Iran
- Province: Isfahan
- County: Isfahan
- District: Central
- Established as a city: 2012

Population (2016)
  - Total: 3,918
- Time zone: UTC+3:30 (IRST)

Ziar (Persian: زيار) (Note: Also romanized as Zeyār, Zīār, and Zīyār) is a city in the Central District of Isfahan County, Isfahan province, Iran, serving as the administrative center for Baraan-e Jonubi Rural District.

== Demographics ==
=== Population ===
At the time of the 2006 National Census, Ziar's population was 3,520 in 927 households, when it was a village in Baraan-e Jonubi Rural District. The following census in 2011 counted 3,593 people in 1,062 households. The 2016 census measured the population as 3,918 people in 1,209 households, by which time the village had been converted to a city.
