= Hossein Sarshar =

Iranian opera singer, actor (1931–1992)

- حسین_سرشار
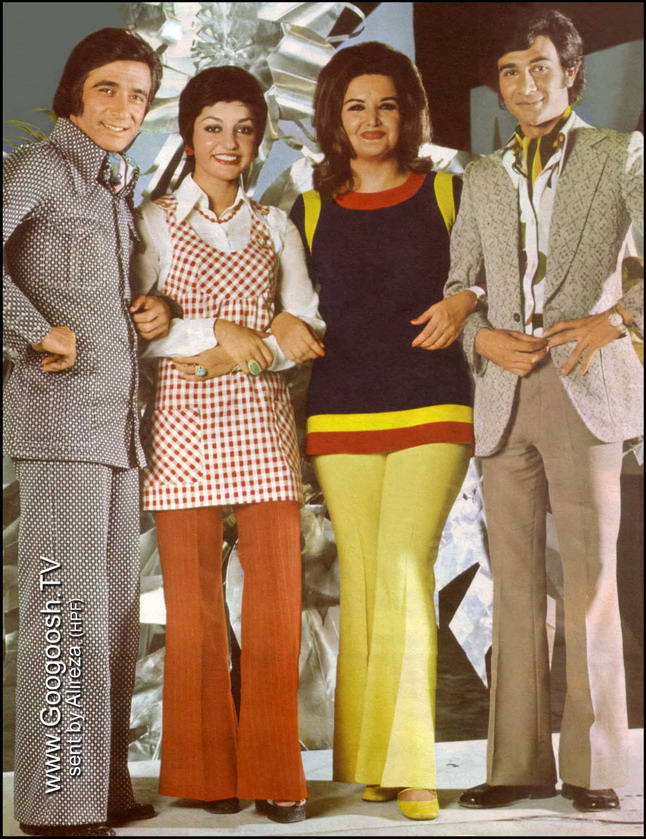
- From left to right: Sarshar, Googoosh, Pouran, and Vafa (singer) in the 1970s
- Born: 1931; Tehran, Pahlavi Iran
- Died: 11 April 1992 (aged 60–61); Abadan, Iran
- Burial place: Behesht-e Zahra
- Occupations: Opera singer, actor

Hossein Sarshar (Persian: حسین_سرشار; 1931 – 11 April 1992) was an Iranian opera singer and film actor. He was in the bass / baritone vocal range.

== Life and career ==
Hossein Sarshar was born in 1931, in Tehran. He took an interest in music at a young age.

He completed his vocal studies at the Higher Conservatory of Music in Tehran (now part of the University of Art), and continued his postgraduate studies with Alba Anzellotti at the Accademia Nazionale di Santa Cecilia in Rome, and with Hélène Bouvier in Paris. While studying in Europe he started working in film dubbing in Italy to help cover his expenses.

After completing his studies, Sarshar worked in Italy in opera for around 2 years. Between 1952 and 1955, Sarshar participated as a solo singer in the concerts at the Tehran Symphony Orchestra conducted by Heshmat Sanjari. He participated in concerts conducted by Farhad Meshkoh in Tehran, and regularly performed in Tehran at Rudaki Hall (now Vahdat Hall). He was a reoccurring guest at the Salzburg Festival in Austria from the mid-1970s until the 1978 at the outbreak of the Iranian Revolution.

Sarshar suffered from Alzheimer's disease in late life. The exact circumstances of his death are unknown. One rumor related to his death is he got confused due to his Alzheimer's and was lost, later he was found dead under a car in Abadan. A second rumor is that his death was due to a serial killer.

== Filmography ==
- Jafar Khan Is Back from the West (1985)
- The Tenants (1987 film)
- Hamoun (1989)
- Ey Iran (film) (1990)
- Renault Tehran 29 (1990)
- The Way and the Wayless (1991)
