= Qahab-e Jonubi Rural District =

Rural district in Isfahan province, Iran

Qahab-e Jonubi Rural District Persian: دهستان قهاب جنوبي
- Rural District
- Location within Iran
- Coordinates: 32°39′N 51°54′E
- Country: Iran
- Province: Isfahan
- County: Isfahan
- District: Central
- Established: 1987

Population (2016)
  - Total: 4,541
- Time zone: UTC+3:30 (IRST)

Qahab-e Jonubi Rural District (Persian: دهستان قهاب جنوبي) is in the Central District of Isfahan County, Isfahan province, Iran. Its capital was the village of Gavart, now a neighborhood in the city of Isfahan.

== Demographics ==
=== Population ===
At the time of the 2006 National Census, the rural district's population was 15,169 in 3,862 households. There were 13,385 inhabitants in 3,733 households at the following census of 2011. The 2016 census measured the population of the rural district as 4,541 in 1,344 households. The most populous of its 23 villages was Jilanabad, with 1,471 people.

=== Other villages in the rural district ===
- Aliabad
- Aminabad
- Firuzabad
- Hasanabad
- Jaladeran
- Kalmanjan
- Mohammadabad
- Qaleh-ye Torkan
- Shahabad
- Susart

=== Former villages now neighborhoods in the city of Isfahan ===
- Chengan
- Khatunabad
- Mohammadabad
