= Qahjavarestan =

City in Isfahan province, Iran

Qahjavarestan Persian: قهجاورستان
- City
- Location within Iran
- Coordinates: 32°42′16″N 51°50′01″E
- Country: Iran
- Province: Isfahan
- County: Isfahan
- District: Central
- Established as a city: 2007

Population (2016)
  - Total: 9,712
- Time zone: UTC+3:30 (IRST)

Qahjavarestan (Persian: قهجاورستان) (Note: Also romanized as Qahjāvarestān and Qahjāverestān; also known as Qahjāvarestāq and Qahjāwaristān) is a city in the Central District of Isfahan County, Isfahan province, Iran, serving as the administrative center for Qahab-e Shomali Rural District.

== Demographics ==
=== Population ===
At the time of the 2006 National Census, Qahjavarestan's population was 6,854 in 1,788 households, when it was a village in Qahab-e Shomali Rural District. The following census in 2011 counted 7,906 people in 2,336 households, by which time the village had been converted to a city. The 2016 census measured the population of the city as 9,712 people in 2,995 households.
