= Dinan, Isfahan =

Village in Isfahan province, Iran

Dinan Persian: دينان
- Village
- Location within Iran
- Coordinates: 32°43′04″N 51°46′40″E
- Country: Iran
- Province: Isfahan
- County: Isfahan
- District: Central
- Rural District: Qahab-e Shomali

Population (2016)
  - Total: 344
- Time zone: UTC+3:30 (IRST)

Dinan (Persian: دينان) (Note: Also romanized as Dīnān; also known as Darīnān and Dīnān Qahāb) is a village in Qahab-e Shomali Rural District of the Central District in Isfahan County, Isfahan province, Iran.

== Demographics ==
=== Population ===
At the time of the 2006 National Census, the village's population was 285 in 87 households. The following census in 2011 counted 235 people in 72 households. The 2016 census measured the population of the village as 344 people in 110 households.
