= Jafar Khan Is Back from the West =

1985 Iranian film

Jafar Khan Is Back from the West Jafar Khan az farang bargashte
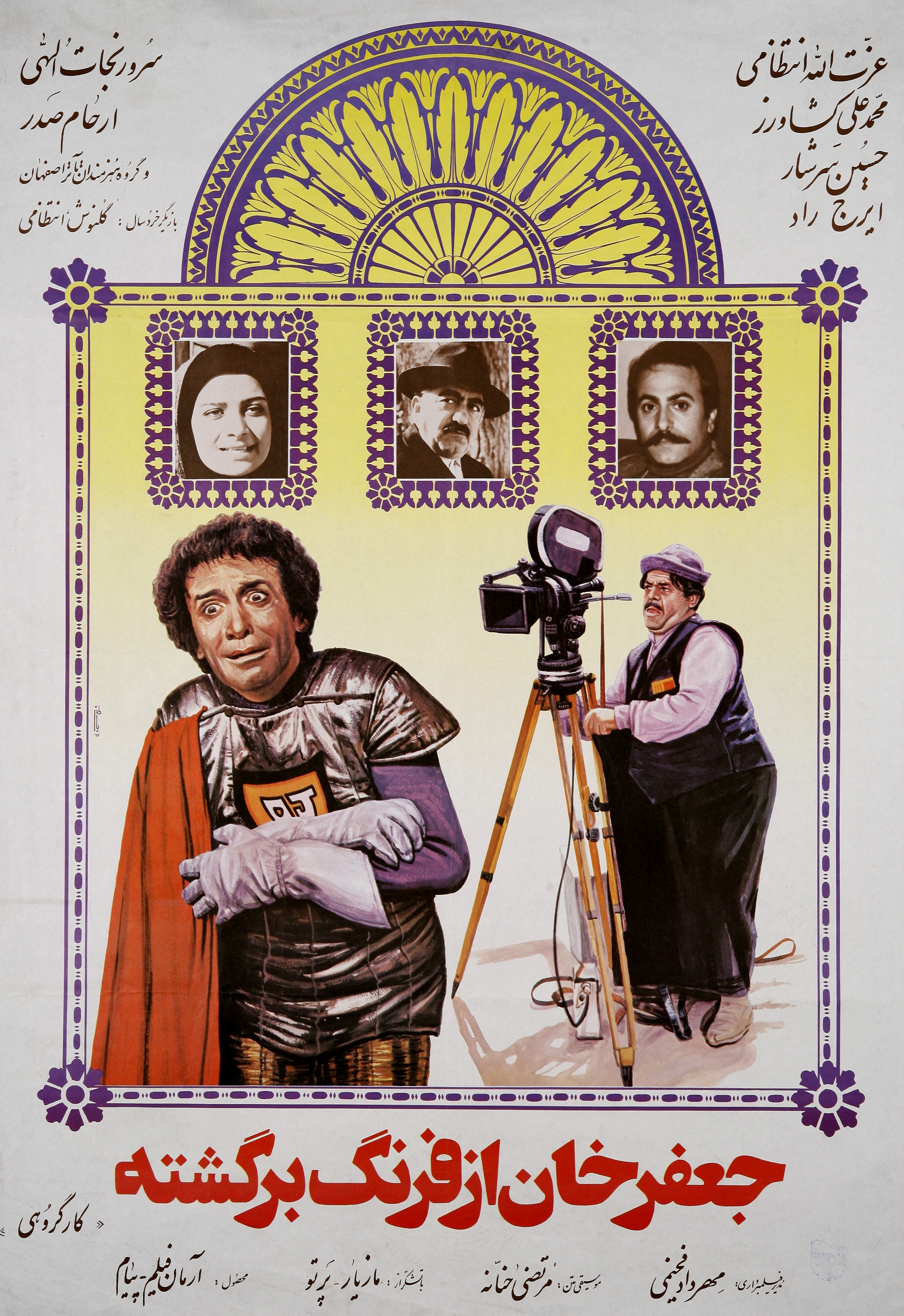
- Film poster
- جعفرخان از فرنگ برگشته
- Directed by: Ali Hatami
- Written by: Hassan Moghadam
- Produced by: Ali Akbar Erfani
- Starring: Ezzatolah Entezami; Hossein Sarshar; Mohammad-Ali Keshavarz; Reza Arham Sadr
- Cinematography: Maziar Partow; Mehrdad Fakhimi
- Edited by: Abbas Ganjavi
- Music by: Morteza Hannaneh
- Production companies: Arman Film; Payam Cinema Organization
- Release date: 1 January 1985 (Iran)
- Running time: 88 minutes
- Country: Iran
- Language: Persian

Jafar Khan Is Back from the West (Persian: جعفرخان از فرنگ برگشته) is a 1985 Iranian comedy-drama film, directed by Ali Hatami. It is based on an original play written in the late Qajar period by Hassan Moghadam. It is about the conflict between tradition and modernity, and Westernization and traditionalism. Part of this film was recorded in the village of Kabutarabad, Isfahan.

== Plot ==
Jafar Khan has been living abroad in a western country and her personality has become emotionless, rootless, unimaginative and ignorant; while his family and those in Iran are acting mostly rooted, emotional and knowledgeable people. Jafar is assigned by the government to build a new city in Jafarabad, Iran which has been renamed New Jaff. The local villagers are employed to help build Jafar's plans to create his ideal society. Jafar tells his father Hajji Akbar that he is marrying a western woman, which sends his father into a rage, and ending with his father having a stroke. His father is rehabilitated, and he continues to build opposition to Jafar. After inciting the villagers to violence, Jafar leaves Iran for the west.

== Cast ==
- Ezzatolah Entezami, as Hajji Akbar
- Hossein Sarshar, as Jafar Khan
- Mohammad-Ali Keshavarz, as Khan Daei
- Reza Arham Sadr, as Dr. Khoshdel
