= Qahab-e Shomali Rural District =

Rural district in Isfahan province, Iran

Qahab-e Shomali Rural District Persian: دهستان قهاب شمالي
- Rural District
- Location within Iran
- Coordinates: 32°44′N 51°50′E
- Country: Iran
- Province: Isfahan
- County: Isfahan
- District: Central
- Established: 1987
- Capital: Qahjavarestan

Population (2016)
  - Total: 13,355
- Time zone: UTC+3:30 (IRST)

Qahab-e Shomali Rural District (Persian: دهستان قهاب شمالي) is in the Central District of Isfahan County, Isfahan province, Iran. It is administered from the city of Qahjavarestan.

== Demographics ==
=== Population ===
At the time of the 2006 National Census, the rural district's population was 33,784 in 9,075 households. There were 28,621 inhabitants in 7,819 households at the following census of 2011. The 2016 census measured the population of the rural district as 13,355 in 4,111 households. The most populous of its 29 villages was Isfahan Babai Air Zone (منطقه هوايي بابائي اصفهان), with 8,664 people.

=== Other villages in the rural district ===
- Amorzeydabad
- Baharan
- Dinan
- Haftshuiyeh
- Hatmabad
- Jolmarz
- Mulenjan
- Murnan
- Zamanabad

=== Former villages now neighborhoods in the city of Isfahan ===
- Andevan
- Hasseh
- Jelvan
- Kian
- Laftun
