= Jar, Iran =

Village in Isfahan province, Iran

Jar Persian: جار
- Village
- Location within Iran
- Coordinates: 32°31′03″N 51°50′17″E
- Country: Iran
- Province: Isfahan
- County: Isfahan
- District: Central
- Rural District: Keraraj

Population (2016)
  - Total: 792
- Time zone: UTC+3:30 (IRST)

Jar (Persian: جار) (Note: Also romanized as Jār; also known as Gar, Jiyār, and Jor) is a village in Keraraj Rural District of the Central District in Isfahan County, Isfahan province, Iran.

== Demographics ==
=== Population ===
At the time of the 2006 National Census, the village's population was 765 in 185 households. The following census in 2011 counted 942 people in 243 households. The 2016 census measured the population of the village as 792 people in 231 households.
