= Keraraj Rural District =

Rural district in Isfahan province, Iran

Keraraj Rural District Persian: دهستان كرارج
- Rural District
- Location within Iran
- Coordinates: 32°31′N 51°45′E
- Country: Iran
- Province: Isfahan
- County: Isfahan
- District: Central
- Established: 1987
- Capital: Dashti

Population (2016)
  - Total: 25,287
- Time zone: UTC+3:30 (IRST)

Keraraj Rural District (Persian: دهستان كرارج) is in the Central District of Isfahan County, Isfahan province, Iran. Its capital is the village of Dashti.

== Demographics ==
=== Population ===
At the time of the 2006 National Census, the rural district's population was 29,032 in 7,453 households. There were 33,809 inhabitants in 9,593 households at the following census of 2011. The 2016 census measured the population of the rural district as 25,287 in 7,619 households. The most populous of its 46 villages was Esfehanak, with 4,414 people.

=== Other villages in the rural district ===
- Bastanabad
- Cheryan
- Eshkavand
- Golestaneh
- Heydarabad
- Ichi
- Jar
- Kabjavan
- Kabutarabad
- Karchegan
- Keychi
- Kuy-e Rah-e Haq
- Margh-e Gachi
- Qaleh-ye Chum
- Qaleh-ye Shur
- Rashenan
- Sadeqabad
- Yafran

=== Former villages now neighborhoods in the city of Isfahan ===
- Denarat
- Fizadan
- Raddan
