= Baraan-e Jonubi Rural District =

Rural district in Isfahan province, Iran

Baraan-e Jonubi Rural District Persian: دهستان براآن جنوبي
- Rural District
- Location within Iran
- Coordinates: 32°27′N 51°55′E
- Country: Iran
- Province: Isfahan
- County: Isfahan
- District: Central
- Established: 1987
- Capital: Ziar

Population (2016)
  - Total: 12,529
- Time zone: UTC+3:30 (IRST)

Baraan-e Jonubi Rural District (Persian: دهستان براآن جنوبي) is in the Central District of Isfahan County, Isfahan province, Iran. It is administered from the city of Ziar.

== Demographics ==
=== Population ===
At the time of the 2006 National Census, the rural district's population was 15,210 in 4,048 households. There were 15,439 inhabitants in 4,592 households at the following census of 2011. The 2016 census measured the population of the rural district as 12,529 in 3,839 households. The most populous of its 35 villages was Ruran, with 2,083 people.

=== Other villages in the rural district ===
- Andalan
- Borkan
- Eziran
- Hermedan
- Kolartan
- Pileh Varan
