= Pileh Mahalleh =

Pileh Mahalleh پيله محله
- Village
- Location within Iran
- Coordinates: 37°04′34″N 50°02′54″E
- Country: Iran
- Province: Gilan
- County: Langarud
- Bakhsh: Otaqvar
- Rural District: Otaqvar

Population (2006)
  - Total: 144
- Time zone: UTC+3:30 (IRST)
  - Summer (DST): UTC+4:30 (IRDT)

Pileh Mahalleh (Persian: پيله محله, also Romanized as Pīleh Maḩalleh) is a village in Otaqvar Rural District, Otaqvar District, Langarud County, Gilan Province, Iran. At the 2006 census, its population was 144, in 36 families.
