= Mahmudabad Rural District (Isfahan County) =

Rural district in Isfahan province, Iran

Mahmudabad Rural District Persian: دهستان محمودآباد
- Rural District
- Location within Iran
- Coordinates: 32°46′N 51°35′E
- Country: Iran
- Province: Isfahan
- County: Isfahan
- District: Central
- Established: 1991
- Capital: Mahmudabad

Population (2016)
  - Total: 0
- Time zone: UTC+3:30 (IRST)

Mahmudabad Rural District (Persian: دهستان محمودآباد) is in the Central District of Isfahan County, Isfahan province, Iran. Its capital is the village of Mahmudabad.

== Demographics ==
=== Population ===
At the time of the 2006 National Census, the rural district's population was 15,205 in 3,815 households. There were 15,176 inhabitants in 4,186 households at the following census of 2011. The 2016 census measured the population of the rural district as zero; therefore, its 14 villages were listed with no population.

=== Former villages now neighborhoods in the city of Isfahan ===
- Aminabad
- Mahmudabad
- Shahrak-e Bakhtiar Dasht
- Shahrak-e Shahid Montazeri
- Shahrak-e Vali-ye Asr
