= Baraan-e Shomali Rural District =

Rural district in Isfahan province, Iran

Baraan-e Shomali Rural District Persian: دهستان براآن شمالي
- Rural District
- Location within Iran
- Coordinates: 32°32′N 51°57′E
- Country: Iran
- Province: Isfahan
- County: Isfahan
- District: Central
- Established: 1987
- Capital: Dastja

Population (2016)
  - Total: 17,726
- Time zone: UTC+3:30 (IRST)

Baraan-e Shomali Rural District (Persian: دهستان براآن شمالي) is in the Central District of Isfahan County, Isfahan province, Iran. Its capital is the village of Dastja.

== Demographics ==
=== Population ===
At the time of the 2006 National Census, the rural district's population was 19,521 in 4,761 households. There were 19,335 inhabitants in 5,585 households at the following census of 2011. The 2016 census measured the population of the rural district as 17,726 in 5,428 households. The most populous of its 42 villages was Bersian, with 1,955 people.

=== Other villages in the rural district ===
- Fasaran
- Jowzdan
- Kondelan
- Kuhan
- Monshian
- Timyart
