= Hossein Shahshahani =

Iranian judge (1895–1962)

Hossien Shahshahani
- Born: 1895; Isfahan, Iran
- Died: 19 March 1962 (aged 66–67); Geneva, Switzerland
- Resting place: Shahshahan mausoleum, Isfahan
- Other names: Seyyed Hossein Shahshahani
- Education: Islamic Law
- Occupation(s): Judge, scholar and statesman
- Known for: Historical Documents and Manuscripts
- Spouse: Zahra Zomorrodian
- Website: shahshahani.info

Hossein Shahshahani (also known as Seyyed Hossein Shahshahani) (Persian: حسین شهشهانی) (1895 – 19 March 1962) was a prominent judge, scholar of Islamic Law and expert of historical documents and manuscripts of Iran.

== Early life and education ==
Shahshahani was born in Isfahan, Iran in 1895 to a prominent and pious family where he received his preliminary and traditional education. His mother was from Allameh Majlesi family and his father was Seyyed Mohammad Sadr Shah Alaee, a religious scholar in Isfahan and a grandson of Shah Alaeddin Mohammad.

He moved to Tehran when he was 17 and subsequently traveled to Najaf where he pursued for seven years his education in advanced Islamic law and jurisprudence. He worked with several Islamic scholars, including Mirza Hossein Naini. This qualified him to be mujtahid who was recognized as an Islamic scholar competent in interpreting Islamic law independently.

== Judicial career ==
Upon returning to Iran in 1921, initially he taught jurisprudence at the Advanced School of Trade (Madrasse-e Aali-e Tejarat) in Tehran. He was then invited by Ali-Akbar Davar, the founder of Iran's modern legal code, to take major responsibilities in the newly established Ministry of Justice of Iran.

His judiciary career took almost 30 years, during which time he served in various positions and moved up the hierarchy to the counselor of the Supreme Court (Divan-e Aali-e Keshvar). He was also the head of the Organization for Registration of Deeds and Properties.

Shahshahani was the permanent member from the Ministry of Justice in the commission that functioned as the inspector general appointed by Reza Shah. Toward the end of his career, in 1952 and 1953 (1331 and 1332), he served as the assistant Minister of Interior and the deputy Minister of Justice when he worked more closely with the Prime Minister, Dr. Mohammad Mosaddegh.

In recognition and appreciation of his superior service and dedication, he received several certificate and medals from the Shah. The medals included Order of the Crown.

Shahshahani had close relationships with most members of the Mosaddegh Cabinet. He was in charge of the Ministry of Justice when Mosaddegh traveled to The Hague to attend the International Court of Justice that was dealing with the nationalization of the Iranian Oil Industry. Shahshahani was also well respected by the clergy and the religious authorities. For example, he had written correspondence and personal meetings with Seyyed Hossein Tabatabaie Borujerdi in Qum.

== Historical documents ==
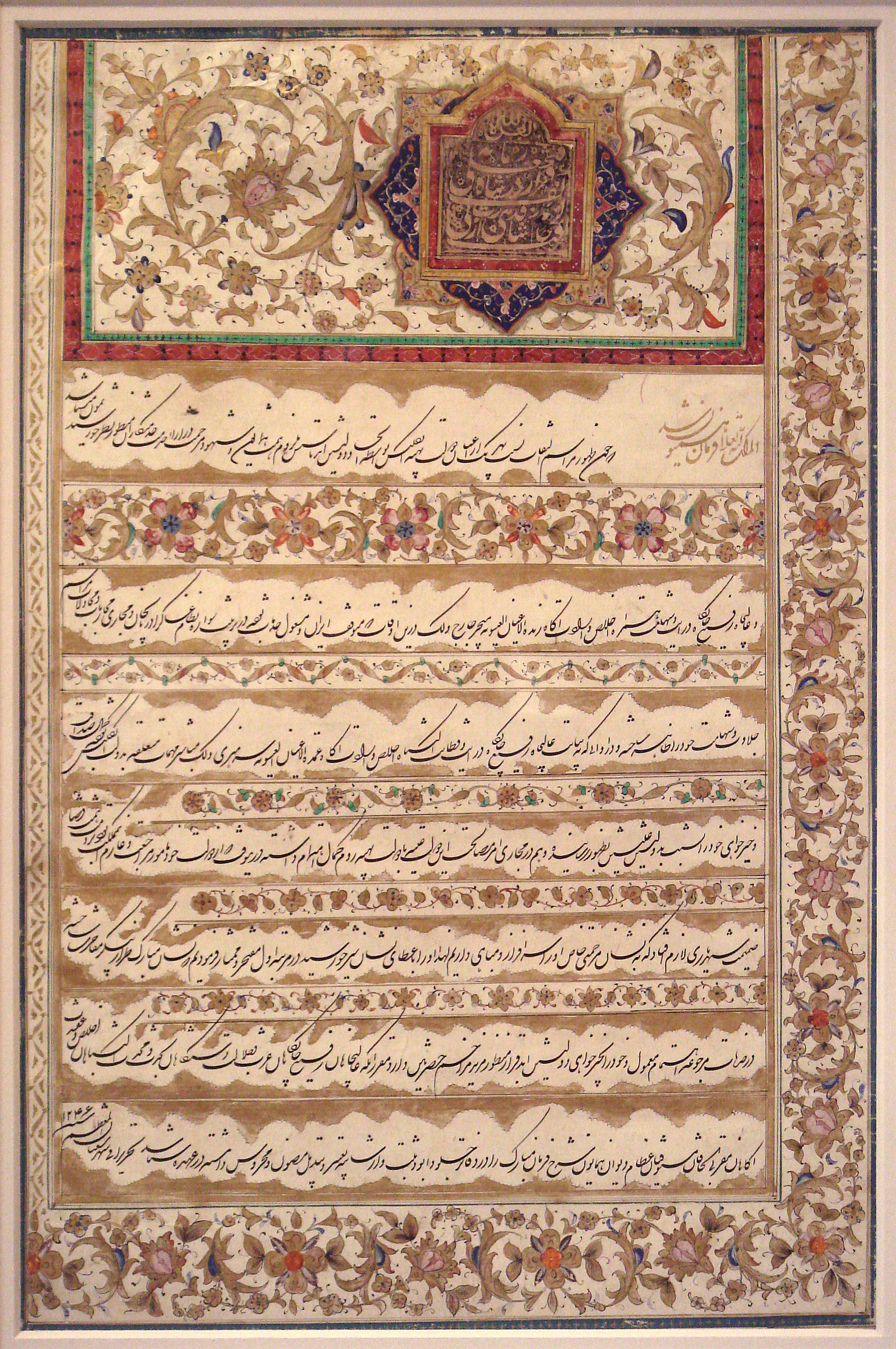
A Fat'h Ali Shah Qajar firman in Shikasta Nastaʿlīq script, January 1831.

Shahshahani was one of the few people who could read, understand and analyze the significance of rare and unique archival material and historical documents and deeds (firmans). They included firmans, manuscripts and calligraphy, hand written orders by kings and rulers, usually in cursive and writing of high historical and aesthetic value. He loved collecting such documents that were sometimes in poor shape. He spent countless hours to read, repair, understand, evaluate and at times frame them.

Shahshahani's valuable collection of such items which included more than 285 firmans and documents were given to the Reza Abbasi Museum in Tehran in 1978 (1357).

== Work with scholars ==
Shahshahani gave close access to his friends and academic experts to study and review his collection for research, analysis and documentation purposes. He helped these people in reading and understanding the often difficult contents of these documents. Most of these scholars have kindly referenced him in their published works.

They include Agha Bozorg Tehrani, (the author of Azzari-a), Jalal al-Din Muhaddis, Dr. Manuchehr Sotudeh, Iraj Afshar, Ali Naghi Monzavi, the French scholar and author Jean Aubin, Dr. Horst Walther from Germany and references made by Louis Massignon.

Shahshahani helped Jean Aubin in his research efforts and made available to him some of his collection related to Aq Qoyunlu and Kara Qoyunlu periods. Jean Aubin's research results were published in Tehran in 1955 both in French and Persian languages as:

Jean Aubin, Archives persanes commentees.

- Note sur quelques documents Aq Qoyunlu, dans Melanges Massignon, I, pp. 9–35 (sous presse).
- Note preliminaire sur les archives du Takya du Tchima-rud.
- (En preparation:) Deux recueils d'insha dédies au vizir timoride Ghiyathu-'d-Din Pir Ahmad Khwafi.

== Selected Research Works ==
Shahshahani published the following works:

- A Partial List of Shahshahani's Documents, mostly Ghajar Period, put together by Gholam Reza Farzanehpour, published in the Central Library of Tehran University "On Manuscripts," No I, ( Daftar-e Avval) 1961 (1339).
- A Decree From Nader Shah Dorrani, (Farmani az Nader Shah-e Dorrani), Iran Culture, (Fahang-e Iran Zamin), Vol 6: pp 159–163.
- The Endowment Document of Kashan Mir Emad Mosque, (Vaghfnameh Masjed-e Mir Emad-e Kashan), Iran Culture, (Fahang-e Iran Zamin), Vol 5: pp 22–50.
- Shahshahan Mausoleum and its Documents, (Bogh-e Shahshahan va Asnad-e An), Calendar of Iran, (Salnameh Keshvar-e Iran), Vol 12: pp 11–64.
- Shahshahani has written a book on Arabic words entitled: Precision in Words, (Daghayegh-e-Loghat). This unpublished book has an introduction, 28 chapters and a conclusion.

== Works on Shahshahan Mausoleum ==
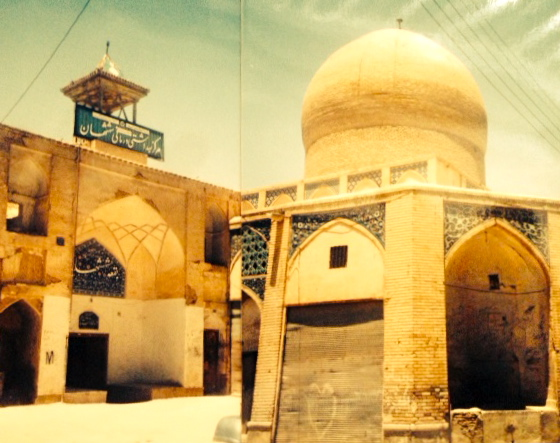
Shahshahan Mausoleum

Shahshahani managed to revive and re-establish the identity of Shahshahan mausoleum during his judicial career. The mausoleum is a historical monument in Isfahan, Iran. It is located beside Jameh Mosque of Isfahan in the Shahshahan District on Ibn-e Sina Street. It is the burial place of a famous Sufi of Isfahan, Shah Alaeddin Mohammad. "The mausoleum was built between 1446 and 1448. Inside and outside of the mausoleum is decorated by plasterwork and tiling. Its dome, which had been destroying in the recent years, has been rebuilt."

Shahshahani battled in courts for many years to extricate the endowments of the Shahshahan mausoleum from unlawful occupiers. He repaired and rebuilt the mausoleum as an important historical building and constructed the Shahshahan School and Health Center beside it.

The monument belongs to the Timurid period. Shahshahani registered the site with the Iran Society For National and Historical Monuments under Registration Number 368 on February 21, 1949 (2 Esfand 1327).

== Final years ==
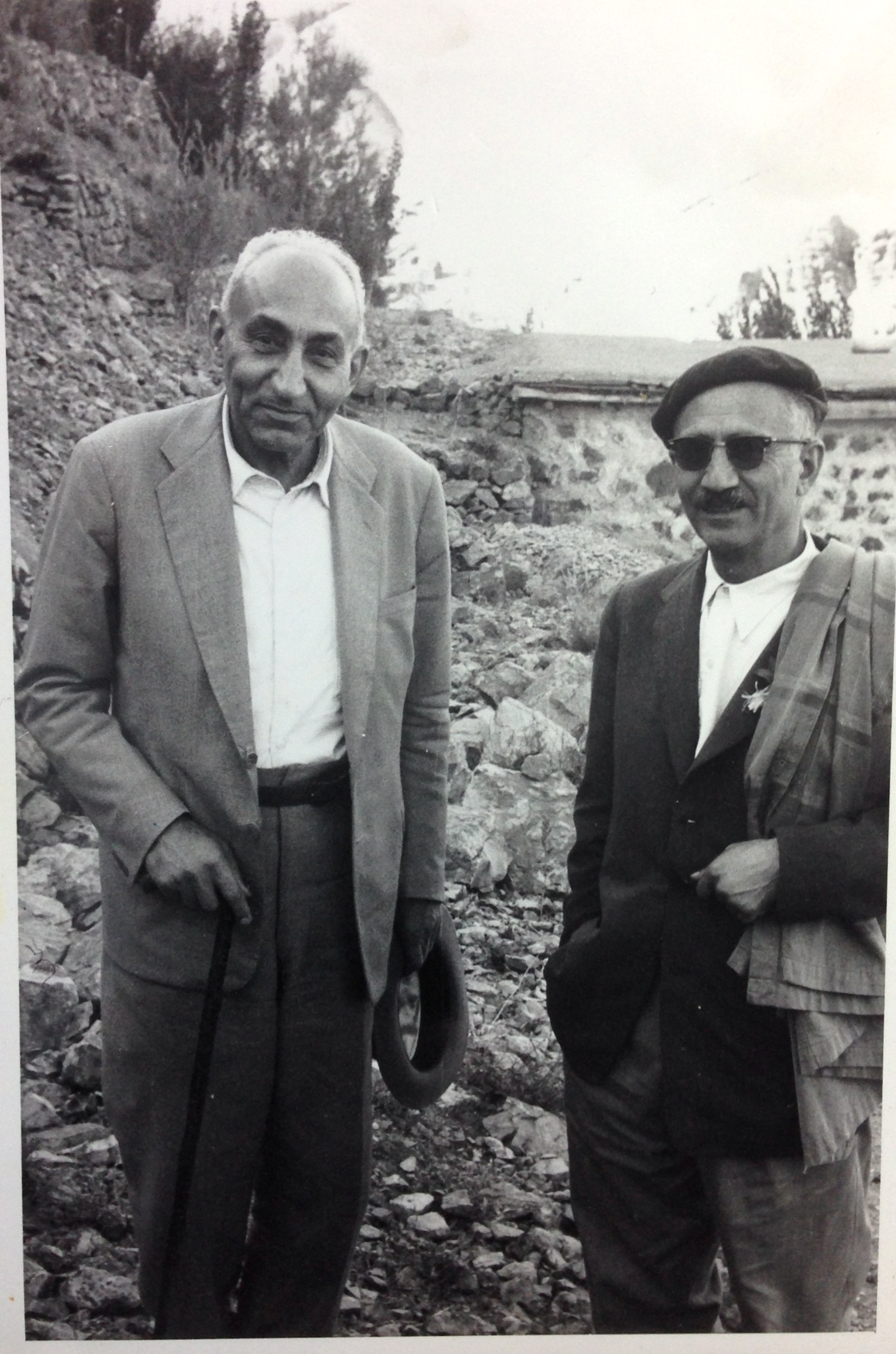
Shahshahani and Allahyar Saleh

Shahshahani retired in August 1953 (Mordad 1332) when Mosaddegh and his cabinet were removed from power in a coup. He spent the last 8 years of his life in writing and research on Iranian historical documents and manuscripts. He shared his knowledge and expertise with his friends and colleagues Allah-Yar Saleh and helped academicians and scholars with their research.

He was a member of the National Library and Archives of Iran affiliated with the National Commissions for UNESCO.

In an effort to further pursue his interest in historical documents, in January 1962, Shahshahani travelled by land to Europe through Istanbul. He visited museums and continued his travels to Geneva, Switzerland, where he died of heart attack on March 19, 1962 (28 Esfand 1340). Shahshahani is buried in the Shahshahan Mausoleum in Isfahan.

Shahshahani had six children who had advanced education and were professional. His only son, Dr. Ahmad Shahshahani, is an author and scholar who was a professor of Economics in Tehran University and California State University and is currently retired.
