= Central District (Isfahan County) =

District in Isfahan province, Iran

Central District (Isfahan County) Persian: بخش مرکزی شهرستان اصفهان
- District
- Location within Iran
- Coordinates: 32°34′N 51°47′E
- Country: Iran
- Province: Isfahan
- County: Isfahan
- Capital: Isfahan

Population (2016)
  - Total: 2,130,970
- Time zone: UTC+3:30 (IRST)

The Central District of Isfahan County (Persian: بخش مرکزی شهرستان اصفهان) is in Isfahan province, Iran. Its capital is the city of Isfahan.

== History ==
The village of Qahjavarestan was converted to a city in 2007, and likewise the village of Ziar in 2012. The city of Isfahan annexed the city of Khvorasgan in 2015.

== Demographics ==
=== Population ===
At the time of the 2006 census, the district's population was 1,860,674 in 515,487 households. The following census in 2011 counted 2,067,821 people in 625,829 households. The 2016 census measured the population of the district as 2,130,970 inhabitants in 671,864 households.

=== Administrative divisions ===
Central District (Isfahan County) Population
Administrative Divisions	2006	2011	2016
Baraan-e Jonubi RD	15,210	15,439	12,529
Baraan-e Shomali RD	19,521	19,335	17,726
Jey RD	17,543	19,210	3,619
Keraraj RD	29,032	33,809	25,287
Mahmudabad RD	15,205	15,176	0
Qahab-e Jonubi RD	15,169	13,385	4,541
Qahab-e Shomali RD	33,784	28,621	13,355
Baharestan (city)	45,538	61,647	79,023
Isfahan (city)	1,583,609	1,756,126	1,961,260
Khvorasgan (city) (Note: Annexed by the city of Isfahan)	86,063	97,167	
Qahjavarestan (city)		7,906	9,712
Ziar (city)			3,918
Total	1,860,674	2,067,821	2,130,970
RD = Rural District
