= Yek Langi =

Village in Isfahan province, Iran

Yek Langi Persian: يك لنگي
- Village
- Location within Iran
- Coordinates: 32°42′57″N 52°05′33″E
- Country: Iran
- Province: Isfahan
- County: Kuhpayeh
- District: Sistan
- Rural District: Sistan

Population (2016)
  - Total: 158
- Time zone: UTC+3:30 (IRST)

Yek Langi (Persian: يك لنگي) (Note: Also romanized as Yak Langī and Yek Lengī; also known as Ek Langi) is a village in Sistan Rural District of Sistan District in Kuhpayeh County, Isfahan province, Iran.

== Demographics ==
=== Population ===
At the time of the 2006 National Census, the village's population was 212 in 56 households, when it was in Kuhpayeh District (Note: Renamed Tudeshk District of Kuhpayeh County) of Isfahan County. The following census in 2011 counted 334 people in 100 households. The 2016 census measured the population of the village as 158 people in 53 households.

In 2021, the district was separated from the county in the establishment of Kuhpayeh County and renamed Tudeshk District. The rural district was transferred to the new Sistan District.
