= Mehdiabad, Sistan =

Village in Isfahan province, Iran

Mehdiabad Persian: مهدي اباد
- Village
- Location within Iran
- Coordinates: 32°46′09″N 52°00′51″E
- Country: Iran
- Province: Isfahan
- County: Kuhpayeh
- District: Sistan
- Rural District: Sistan

Population (2016)
  - Total: 29
- Time zone: UTC+3:30 (IRST)

Mehdiabad (Persian: مهدي اباد) (Note: Also romanized as Mahdīābād and Mehdīābād) is a village in Sistan Rural District of Sistan District in Kuhpayeh County, Isfahan province, Iran.

== Demographics ==
=== Population ===
At the time of the 2006 National Census, the village's population was 41 in nine households, when it was in Kuhpayeh District (Note: Renamed Tudeshk District of Kuhpayeh County) of Isfahan County. The following census in 2011 counted 29 people in eight households. The 2016 census measured the population of the village as 29 people in eight households.

In 2021, the district was separated from the county in the establishment of Kuhpayeh County and renamed Tudeshk District. The rural district was transferred to the new Sistan District.
