= Vartun =

Village in Isfahan province, Iran

Vartun Persian: ورطون
- Village
- Location within Iran
- Coordinates: 32°50′11″N 52°06′52″E
- Country: Iran
- Province: Isfahan
- County: Kuhpayeh
- District: Sistan
- Rural District: Sistan

Population (2016)
  - Total: 576
- Time zone: UTC+3:30 (IRST)

Vartun (Persian: ورطون) (Note: Also romanized as Varţūn and Vartūn; also known as Varţān, Vartan, and Varūn) is a village in Sistan Rural District of Sistan District in Kuhpayeh County, Isfahan province, Iran.

== Demographics ==
=== Population ===
At the time of the 2006 National Census, the village's population was 477 in 123 households, when it was in Kuhpayeh District (Note: Renamed Tudeshk District of Kuhpayeh County) of Isfahan County. The following census in 2011 counted 479 people in 153 households. The 2016 census measured the population of the village as 576 people in 187 households, the most populous in its rural district.

In 2021, the district was separated from the county in the establishment of Kuhpayeh County and renamed Tudeshk District. The rural district was transferred to the new Sistan District.
