= Fasharak =

Village in Isfahan province, Iran

Fasharak Persian: فشارك
- Village
- Location within Iran
- Coordinates: 32°50′50″N 52°21′35″E
- Country: Iran
- Province: Isfahan
- County: Kuhpayeh
- District: Sistan
- Rural District: Zefreh

Population (2016)
  - Total: 122
- Time zone: UTC+3:30 (IRST)

Fasharak (Persian: فشارك) (Note: Also romanized as Fashārak, Fashārk, Feshārak, and Feshārk) is a village in Zefreh Rural District of Sistan District in Kuhpayeh County, Isfahan province, Iran.

== Demographics ==
=== Population ===
At the time of the 2006 National Census, the village's population was 115 in 53 households, when it was in Kuhpayeh District (Note: Renamed Tudeshk District of Kuhpayeh County) of Isfahan County. The following census in 2011 counted 83 people in 47 households. The 2016 census measured the population of the village as 122 people in 44 households.

In 2021, the district was separated from the county in the establishment of Kuhpayeh County and renamed Tudeshk District. The rural district was transferred to the new Sistan District.
