= Randavan =

Village in Isfahan province, Iran

Randavan Persian: رندوان
- Village
- Location within Iran
- Country: Iran
- Province: Isfahan
- County: Kuhpayeh
- District: Sistan
- Rural District: Zefreh

Population (2016)
  - Total: Below reporting threshold
- Time zone: UTC+3:30 (IRST)

Randavan (Persian: رندوان) (Note: Also romanized as Randavān) is a village in Zefreh Rural District of Sistan District in Kuhpayeh County, Isfahan province, Iran.

== Demographics ==
=== Population ===
At the time of the 2006 National Census, the village's population was 23 in five households, when it was in Kuhpayeh District (Note: Renamed Tudeshk District of Kuhpayeh County) of Isfahan County. The following censuses in 2011 and 2016 counted a population below the reporting threshold.

In 2021, the district was separated from the county in the establishment of Kuhpayeh County and renamed Tudeshk District. The rural district was transferred to the new Sistan District.
