= Government of Isfahan =

Isfahan governance

The government of Isfahan consists of a mayor and a 13 member municipal legislature. The Isfahan National Holy Association was involved in the Persian Constitutional Revolution. The politic of Isfahan is based on the 1979 Constitution, which made the country a theocratic Islamic republic in which the various powers are overseen by a body of clerics.

== Legislature ==
The Islamic City Council of Isfahan is a 13 member municipal legislature.

The five representatives who were elected in the 2020 Iranian legislative election Islamic Consultative Assembly were Zahra Sheikhi, Abbas Moghtadaei, Ayatollah Hossein Mirazei, Mahdi Toghyani, and Amir Hosein Banki Poor Fard. Those elected in the 2016 Iranian Assembly of Experts election were Yousef Tabatabai Nejad, Abdul-Nabi Namazi, Abdolmahmoud Abdollahi, Morteza Moghtadai and Abdolhasan Mahdavi.

Between 2019 and 2020, the Municipality of Isfahan had a budget of approximately six trillion tomans, an 86% increase compared to 2018. 71% of the budget is allocated for construction. The budget is expected to double in 2021.

== Executive ==
Office holders
Office name	Name	Since
Mayor	Ghodratollah Noroozi	2017
General Attorney	Ali Esfahani	2019

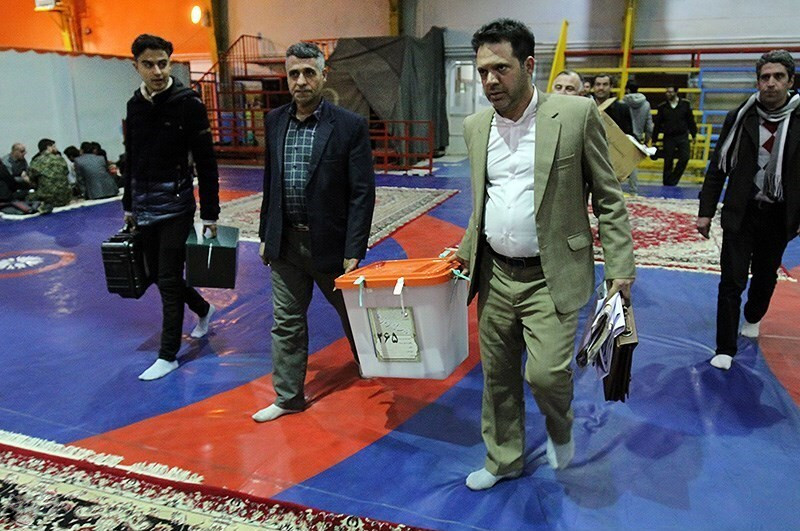
isfahan Iran election jan 2020

== Districts ==
List of neighborhoods in Isfahan

- District 1: Bid Abad, Darb Koosh, Lenban, Shahzade Ebrahim, Abas Abad, Posht Baro
- District 2: Barzan
- District 3: Ahmad Aabad, Sartaveh, Juybareh, Shahshahan, Baghkaran
- District 4: Moshtagh, Penart, Shahrak-e Zayandeh Rud
- District 5: Sichan, Bagh Zereshk
- District 6: Denart, Bagh Negar - Ayne Khane, Mardavij
- District 7: Baboldasht, Sheikh Eshragh, Barazande, Bagh Fadak, Kave, Milad, Farvardin, Shahed, Molavi, Poria Vali, Rahim abad
- District 8: Khane Efahan
- District 9: Jerokan, Javan, Zajan, Nazhvan, Nasr Abad, Baharanchi, Zahran, Koohanestan, Valdan, Ladaan, Goortan, Golestan, Azadan, Kardalan
- District 10: Atsharan, Parvin, Askarieh, Mosala, Haftoon, Laleh, Sheikh Tosi, Sarvestan, Dashtestan, Fajr, Khajeh Amid, Kooye Narges, Joharan, South hase, Mola Sadra, Atar neishabori, Gorgan
- District 11: Limjir, Eslami, Darb Meidan (Sajad), Mashadeh, Babukan, Zajan, Tahoneh, Rehnan
- District 12: Asheghabad
- District 13: Ferdows Garden, Vali Asr, Amirie, Ziar, Keshavarzi, Ghaemie, Dastgerd khiar, Golzar, Shafagh
- District 14: Dark, Imam Khomeini, Montazer al-Mahdi, Aman Samani, Mahdie, Elahie, Arznan, Sodan, Doteflan, Shahpasand, North Hase
- District 15: Sofla, Rajaei, Buzan, Pozve, Arghavanie, Gavart, Raran, Khatoon abad, Bertianchi (Ghale no), Andvan, Deh no Kalman,Jey Shir, Jey Rural District, Kangaz, Ardaji, Sofla, Kerdabad, Satar

== See also ==
- Isfahan Police Department
- Administration of Isfahan
