= Khalti =

Village in Isfahan province, Iran

Khalti Persian: خالتي
- Village
- Location within Iran
- Coordinates: 32°42′25″N 52°43′44″E
- Country: Iran
- Province: Isfahan
- County: Kuhpayeh
- District: Tudeshk
- Rural District: Tudeshk

Population (2016)
  - Total: 42
- Time zone: UTC+3:30 (IRST)

Khalti (Persian: خالتي) (Note: Also romanized as Khāltī, Khālţī, and Khālatī; also known as Khālt) is a village in Tudeshk Rural District of Tudeshk District (Note: Formerly Kuhpayeh District of Isfahan County) in Kuhpayeh County, Isfahan province, Iran.

== Demographics ==
=== Population ===
At the time of the 2006 National Census, the village's population was 64 in 21 households, when it was in Kuhpayeh District (Note: Renamed Tudeshk District of Kuhpayeh County) of Isfahan County. The following census in 2011 counted 49 people in 17 households. The 2016 census measured the population of the village as 42 people in 15 households.

In 2021, the district was separated from the county in the establishment of Kuhpayeh County and renamed Tudeshk District.
