= Luteri =

Village in Isfahan province, Iran

Luteri Persian: لوتري
- Village
- Location within Iran
- Coordinates: 32°48′53″N 52°24′15″E
- Country: Iran
- Province: Isfahan
- County: Kuhpayeh
- District: Tudeshk
- Rural District: Jabal

Population (2016)
  - Total: 23
- Time zone: UTC+3:30 (IRST)

Luteri (Persian: لوتري) (Note: Also romanized as Lūterī) is a village in Jabal Rural District of Tudeshk District (Note: Formerly Kuhpayeh District of Isfahan County) in Kuhpayeh County, Isfahan province, Iran.

== Demographics ==
=== Population ===
At the time of the 2006 National Census, the village's population was 17 in 11 households, when it was in Kuhpayeh District (Note: Renamed Tudeshk District of Kuhpayeh County) of Isfahan County. The following census in 2011 counted 14 people in nine households. The 2016 census measured the population of the village as 23 people in nine households.

In 2021, the district was separated from the county in the establishment of Kuhpayeh County and renamed Tudeshk District.
