= Harizeh =

Village in Isfahan province, Iran

Harizeh Persian: هريزه
- Village
- Location within Iran
- Coordinates: 32°49′12″N 52°25′41″E
- Country: Iran
- Province: Isfahan
- County: Kuhpayeh
- District: Tudeshk
- Rural District: Jabal

Population (2016)
  - Total: 90
- Time zone: UTC+3:30 (IRST)

Harizeh (Persian: هريزه) (Note: Also romanized as Harīzeh and Herīzeh; also known as Harpazeh Jabal and Kūkī) is a village in Jabal Rural District of Tudeshk District (Note: Formerly Kuhpayeh District of Isfahan County) in Kuhpayeh County, Isfahan province, Iran.

== Demographics ==
=== Population ===
At the time of the 2006 National Census, the village's population was 106 in 52 households, when it was in Kuhpayeh District (Note: Renamed Tudeshk District of Kuhpayeh County) of Isfahan County. The following census in 2011 counted 119 people in 60 households. The 2016 census measured the population of the village as 90 people in 38 households.

In 2021, the district was separated from the county in the establishment of Kuhpayeh County and renamed Tudeshk District.
