= Kordabad, Isfahan =

Village in Isfahan province, Iran

Kordabad Persian: كرداباد
- Village
- Location within Iran
- Coordinates: 32°48′46″N 52°25′43″E
- Country: Iran
- Province: Isfahan
- County: Kuhpayeh
- District: Tudeshk
- Rural District: Jabal

Population (2016)
  - Total: 133
- Time zone: UTC+3:30 (IRST)

Kordabad (Persian: كرداباد) (Note: Also romanized as Kard Ābād, Kerdābād, and Kordābād) is a village in Jabal Rural District of Tudeshk District (Note: Formerly Kuhpayeh District of Isfahan County) in Kuhpayeh County, Isfahan province, Iran.

== Demographics ==
=== Population ===
At the time of the 2006 National Census, the village's population was 88 in 28 households, when it was in Kuhpayeh District (Note: Renamed Tudeshk District of Kuhpayeh County) of Isfahan County. The following census in 2011 counted 71 people in 24 households. The 2016 census measured the population of the village as 133 people in 52 households.

In 2021, the district was separated from the county in the establishment of Kuhpayeh County and renamed Tudeshk District.
