= Ali Ebrahim, Iran =

Village in Isfahan province, Iran

Ali Ebrahim Persian: علي ابراهيم
- Village
- Location within Iran
- Coordinates: 32°48′23″N 52°29′41″E
- Country: Iran
- Province: Isfahan
- County: Kuhpayeh
- District: Tudeshk
- Rural District: Jabal

Population (2016)
  - Total: 10
- Time zone: UTC+3:30 (IRST)

Ali Ebrahim (Persian: علي ابراهيم) (Note: Also romanized as ‘Alī Ebrāhīm) is a village in Jabal Rural District of Tudeshk District (Note: Formerly Kuhpayeh District of Isfahan County) in Kuhpayeh County, Isfahan province, Iran.

== Demographics ==
=== Population ===
At the time of the 2006 National Census, the village's population was 21 in nine households, when it was in Kuhpayeh District (Note: Renamed Tudeshk District of Kuhpayeh County) of Isfahan County. The following census in 2011 counted 12 people in six households. The 2016 census measured the population of the village as 10 people in six households.

In 2021, the district was separated from the county in the establishment of Kuhpayeh County and renamed Tudeshk District.
