= Dastgerd, Kuhpayeh =

Village in Isfahan province, Iran

Dastgerd Persian: دستگرد
- Village
- Location within Iran
- Country: Iran
- Province: Isfahan
- County: Kuhpayeh
- District: Tudeshk
- Rural District: Tudeshk

Population (2016)
  - Total: 45
- Time zone: UTC+3:30 (IRST)

Dastgerd (Persian: دستگرد) (Note: Also romanized as Dast Gerd) is a village in Tudeshk Rural District of Tudeshk District (Note: Formerly Kuhpayeh District of Isfahan County) in Kuhpayeh County, Isfahan province, Iran.

== Demographics ==
=== Population ===
At the time of the 2006 National Census, the village's population was 30 in 12 households, when it was in Kuhpayeh District (Note: Renamed Tudeshk District of Kuhpayeh County) of Isfahan County. The following census in 2011 counted six people in four households. The 2016 census measured the population of the village as 45 people in 17 households.

In 2021, the district was separated from the county in the establishment of Kuhpayeh County and renamed Tudeshk District.
