= District 4, Isfahan =

Coordinates: 32.64248°N 51.707822°E

District 4 is a district in Isfahan, Iran.

There is a nuclear research center close to this district.

== Infrastructure ==
Transit: Roshandasht Blvrd, Bazarche street, Moshtagh street, and Arghavanie street.

- Amenities

Nokhodi mountain, Sarouyeh, a heritage site, and Isfahan Exhibition.

There are seven parks, three swimming pools, and five gymnasiums around the district. There are 58 mosques, 5 libraries, and 5 culture education buildings in the district.

== Neighborhoods ==
- Fenart or Pinart
- Shahrake Zayanderoud – industrial district of Penart and Roshan Shahr.
- Kerdabad – subject to an urban renewal program
- Baharan – Shahrake Fazel
- Bagh Ghadir – Khalil Abad
- Shahrestan bridge
- Hamedanian
- Cheshme Baqer khan
- Zowan
- Kalame Kharan
- Mofateh
- Mehrabad – a village in the past
- Roknodoleh
- Kalman
- Shahzeid
