= Jeshuqan =

Village in Isfahan province, Iran

Jeshuqan Persian: جشوقان
- Village
- Location within Iran
- Coordinates: 32°41′36″N 52°43′50″E
- Country: Iran
- Province: Isfahan
- County: Kuhpayeh
- District: Tudeshk
- Rural District: Tudeshk

Population (2016)
  - Total: 409
- Time zone: UTC+3:30 (IRST)

Jeshuqan (Persian: جشوقان) (Note: Also romanized as Jeshūqān; also known as Gashgūn, Gashkūn, Gashvagan, Jeshvaghan, and Haft Yārān) is a village in Tudeshk Rural District of Tudeshk District (Note: Formerly Kuhpayeh District of Isfahan County) in Kuhpayeh County, Isfahan province, Iran.

== Demographics ==
=== Population ===
At the time of the 2006 National Census, the village's population was 482 in 139 households, when it was in Kuhpayeh District (Note: Renamed Tudeshk District of Kuhpayeh County) of Isfahan County. The following census in 2011 counted 354 people in 123 households. The 2016 census measured the population of the village as 409 people in 144 households.

In 2021, the district was separated from the county in the establishment of Kuhpayeh County and renamed Tudeshk District.
