= Sahr, Isfahan =

Village in Isfahan province, Iran

Sahr Persian: سهر
- Village
- Location within Iran
- Coordinates: 32°45′33″N 52°35′12″E
- Country: Iran
- Province: Isfahan
- County: Kuhpayeh
- District: Tudeshk
- Rural District: Jabal

Population (2016)
  - Total: 102
- Time zone: UTC+3:30 (IRST)

Sahr (Persian: سهر) (Note: Also romanized as Sohr; also known as Sor, Sowr, and Sūr) is a village in Jabal Rural District of Tudeshk District (Note: Formerly Kuhpayeh District of Isfahan County) in Kuhpayeh County, Isfahan province, Iran.

== Demographics ==
=== Population ===
At the time of the 2006 National Census, the village's population was 109 in 34 households, when it was in Kuhpayeh District (Note: Renamed Tudeshk District of Kuhpayeh County) of Isfahan County. The following census in 2011 counted 102 people in 34 households. The 2016 census measured the population of the village as 102 people in 35 households.

In 2021, the district was separated from the county in the establishment of Kuhpayeh County and renamed Tudeshk District.
