= Arvajeh =

Village in Isfahan province, Iran

Arvajeh Persian: اروجه
- Village
- Location within Iran
- Coordinates: 32°44′42″N 52°43′39″E
- Country: Iran
- Province: Isfahan
- County: Kuhpayeh
- District: Tudeshk
- Rural District: Tudeshk

Population (2016)
  - Total: 121
- Time zone: UTC+3:30 (IRST)

Arvajeh (Persian: اروجه) (Note: Also romanized as Arūjeh, Arvajeh, and Arvejeh) is a village in Tudeshk Rural District of Tudeshk District (Note: Formerly Kuhpayeh District of Isfahan County) in Kuhpayeh County, Isfahan province, Iran.

== Demographics ==
=== Population ===
At the time of the 2006 National Census, the village's population was 17 in four households, when it was in Kuhpayeh District (Note: Renamed Tudeshk District of Kuhpayeh County) of Isfahan County. The following census in 2011 counted 10 people in four households. The 2016 census measured the population of the village as 121 people in 42 households.

In 2021, the district was separated from the county in the establishment of Kuhpayeh County and renamed Tudeshk District.
