= Dastgerdu =

Village in Isfahan province, Iran

Dastgerdu Persian: دستگردو
- Village
- Location within Iran
- Coordinates: 32°47′18″N 52°43′34″E
- Country: Iran
- Province: Isfahan
- County: Kuhpayeh
- District: Tudeshk
- Rural District: Tudeshk

Population (2016)
  - Total: 13
- Time zone: UTC+3:30 (IRST)

Dastgerdu (Persian: دستگردو) (Note: Also romanized as Dast Gerdow and Dastgerdū; also known as Dastgerd) is a village in Tudeshk Rural District of Tudeshk District (Note: Formerly Kuhpayeh District of Isfahan County) in Kuhpayeh County, Isfahan province, Iran.

== Demographics ==
=== Population ===
At the time of the 2006 National Census, the village's population was 11 in eight households, when it was in Kuhpayeh District (Note: Renamed Tudeshk District of Kuhpayeh County) of Isfahan County. The following census in 2011 counted 10 people in eight households. The 2016 census measured the population of the village as 13 people in nine households.

In 2021, the district was separated from the county in the establishment of Kuhpayeh County and renamed Tudeshk District.
