= Zederk =

Village in Isfahan province, Iran

Zederk Persian: زدرك
- Village
- Location within Iran
- Coordinates: 32°42′03″N 52°43′35″E
- Country: Iran
- Province: Isfahan
- County: Kuhpayeh
- District: Tudeshk
- Rural District: Tudeshk

Population (2016)
  - Total: 10
- Time zone: UTC+3:30 (IRST)

Zederk (Persian: زدرك) (Note: Also romanized as Zadrak) is a village in Tudeshk Rural District of Tudeshk District (Note: Formerly Kuhpayeh District of Isfahan County) in Kuhpayeh County, Isfahan province, Iran.

== Demographics ==
=== Population ===
At the time of the 2006 National Census, the village's population was 22 in five households, when it was in Kuhpayeh District (Note: Renamed Tudeshk District of Kuhpayeh County) of Isfahan County. The following census in 2011 counted 19 people in five households. The 2016 census measured the population of the village as 10 people in five households.

In 2021, the district was separated from the county in the establishment of Kuhpayeh County and renamed Tudeshk District.
