= Khanabad, Isfahan =

Village in Isfahan province, Iran

Khanabad Persian: خان اباد
- Village
- Location within Iran
- Coordinates: 32°46′12″N 52°39′13″E
- Country: Iran
- Province: Isfahan
- County: Kuhpayeh
- District: Tudeshk
- Rural District: Tudeshk

Population (2016)
  - Total: 9
- Time zone: UTC+3:30 (IRST)

Khanabad (Persian: خان اباد) (Note: Also romanized as Khānābād) is a village in Tudeshk Rural District of Tudeshk District (Note: Formerly Kuhpayeh District of Isfahan County) in Kuhpayeh County, Isfahan province, Iran.

== Demographics ==
=== Population ===
At the time of the 2006 National Census, the village's population was 19 in 10 households, when it was in Kuhpayeh District (Note: Renamed Tudeshk District of Kuhpayeh County) of Isfahan County. The following census in 2011 counted 12 people in six households. The 2016 census measured the population of the village as nine people in six households.

In 2021, the district was separated from the county in the establishment of Kuhpayeh County and renamed Tudeshk District.
