= Kamal Beyk =

Village in Isfahan province, Iran

Kamal Beyk Persian: كمال بيك
- Village
- Location within Iran
- Coordinates: 32°42′45″N 52°32′04″E
- Country: Iran
- Province: Isfahan
- County: Kuhpayeh
- District: Tudeshk
- Rural District: Jabal

Population (2016)
  - Total: 186
- Time zone: UTC+3:30 (IRST)

Kamal Beyk (Persian: كمال بيك) (Note: Also romanized as Kamāl Beyk and Kamāl Bik; also known as Kamāl Bak and Kamāl Beyg) is a village in Jabal Rural District of Tudeshk District (Note: Formerly Kuhpayeh District of Isfahan County) in Kuhpayeh County, Isfahan province, Iran.

== Demographics ==
=== Population ===
At the time of the 2006 National Census, the village's population was 136 in 35 households, when it was in Kuhpayeh District (Note: Renamed Tudeshk District of Kuhpayeh County) of Isfahan County. The following census in 2011 counted 136 people in 39 households. The 2016 census measured the population of the village as 186 people in 63 households.

In 2021, the district was separated from the county in the establishment of Kuhpayeh County and renamed Tudeshk District.
