= Abbasabad, Kuhpayeh =

Village in Isfahan province, Iran

Abbasabad Persian: عباس اباد
- Village
- Location within Iran
- Coordinates: 32°47′57″N 52°35′12″E
- Country: Iran
- Province: Isfahan
- County: Kuhpayeh
- District: Tudeshk
- Rural District: Jabal

Population (2016)
  - Total: 20
- Time zone: UTC+3:30 (IRST)

Abbasabad (Persian: عباس اباد) (Note: Also romanized as ‘Abbāsābād) is a village in Jabal Rural District of Tudeshk District (Note: Formerly Kuhpayeh District of Isfahan County) in Kuhpayeh County, Isfahan province, Iran.

== Demographics ==
=== Population ===
At the time of the 2006 National Census, the village's population was 23 in eight households, when it was in Kuhpayeh District (Note: Renamed Tudeshk District of Kuhpayeh County) of Isfahan County. The following census in 2011 counted 21 people in seven households. The 2016 census measured the population of the village as 20 people in seven households.

In 2021, the district was separated from the county in the establishment of Kuhpayeh County and renamed Tudeshk District.
