= Sorkhi, Isfahan =

Village in Isfahan province, Iran

Sorkhi Persian: سرخي
- Village
- Location within Iran
- Country: Iran
- Province: Isfahan
- County: Kuhpayeh
- District: Tudeshk
- Rural District: Tudeshk

Population (2016)
  - Total: 12
- Time zone: UTC+3:30 (IRST)

Sorkhi (Persian: سرخي) (Note: Also romanized as Sorkhī) is a village in Tudeshk Rural District of Tudeshk District (Note: Formerly Kuhpayeh District of Isfahan County) in Kuhpayeh County, Isfahan province, Iran.

== Demographics ==
=== Population ===
At the time of the 2006 National Census, the village's population was 22 in six households, when it was in Kuhpayeh District (Note: Renamed Tudeshk District of Kuhpayeh County) of Isfahan County. The following census in 2011 counted 18 people in five households. The 2016 census measured the population of the village as 12 people in four households.

In 2021, the district was separated from the county in the establishment of Kuhpayeh County and renamed Tudeshk District.
