= Olunabad =

Village in Isfahan province, Iran

Olunabad Persian: علون اباد
- Village
- Location within Iran
- Coordinates: 32°48′55″N 52°31′04″E
- Country: Iran
- Province: Isfahan
- County: Kuhpayeh
- District: Tudeshk
- Rural District: Jabal

Population (2016)
  - Total: 127
- Time zone: UTC+3:30 (IRST)

Olunabad (Persian: علون اباد) (Note: Also romanized as Alunābād, Oloon Abad, ‘Oloonābād, and Olūnābād) is a village in Jabal Rural District of Tudeshk District (Note: Formerly Kuhpayeh District of Isfahan County) in Kuhpayeh County, Isfahan province, Iran.

== Demographics ==
=== Population ===
At the time of the 2006 National Census, the village's population was 159 in 80 households, when it was in Kuhpayeh District (Note: Renamed Tudeshk District of Kuhpayeh County) of Isfahan County. The following census in 2011 counted 109 people in 61 households. The 2016 census measured the population of the village as 127 people in 64 households.

In 2021, the district was separated from the county in the establishment of Kuhpayeh County and renamed Tudeshk District.
