= Homageran =

Village in Isfahan province, Iran

Homageran Persian: هماگران
- Village
- Location within Iran
- Coordinates: 32°47′17″N 52°26′21″E
- Country: Iran
- Province: Isfahan
- County: Kuhpayeh
- District: Tudeshk
- Rural District: Jabal

Population (2016)
  - Total: 42
- Time zone: UTC+3:30 (IRST)

Homageran (Persian: هماگران) (Note: Also romanized as Homāgerān) is a village in Jabal Rural District of Tudeshk District (Note: Formerly Kuhpayeh District of Isfahan County) in Kuhpayeh County, Isfahan province, Iran.

== Demographics ==
=== Population ===
At the time of the 2006 National Census, the village's population was 24 in eight households, when it was in Kuhpayeh District (Note: Renamed Tudeshk District of Kuhpayeh County) of Isfahan County. The following census in 2011 counted 20 people in 10 households. The 2016 census measured the population of the village as 42 people in 21 households.

In 2021, the district was separated from the county in the establishment of Kuhpayeh County and renamed Tudeshk District.
