= Bad Afshan =

Village in Isfahan province, Iran

Bad Afshan Persian: بادافشان
- Village
- Location within Iran
- Coordinates: 32°45′01″N 52°42′33″E
- Country: Iran
- Province: Isfahan
- County: Kuhpayeh
- District: Tudeshk
- Rural District: Tudeshk

Population (2016)
  - Total: 170
- Time zone: UTC+3:30 (IRST)

Bad Afshan (Persian: بادافشان) (Note: Also romanized as Bād Afshān; also known as Bād Fashān) is a village in Tudeshk Rural District of Tudeshk District (Note: Formerly Kuhpayeh District of Isfahan County) in Kuhpayeh County, Isfahan province, Iran.

== Demographics ==
=== Population ===
At the time of the 2006 National Census, the village's population was 200 in 68 households, when it was in Kuhpayeh District (Note: Renamed Tudeshk District of Kuhpayeh County) of Isfahan County. The following census in 2011 counted 150 people in 61 households. The 2016 census measured the population of the village as 170 people in 66 households.

In 2021, the district was separated from the county in the establishment of Kuhpayeh County and renamed Tudeshk District.
