= Jezeh, Isfahan =

Village in Isfahan province, Iran

Jezeh Persian: جزه
- Village
- Location within Iran
- Coordinates: 32°44′21″N 52°32′17″E
- Country: Iran
- Province: Isfahan
- County: Kuhpayeh
- District: Tudeshk
- Rural District: Jabal

Population (2016)
  - Total: 835
- Time zone: UTC+3:30 (IRST)

Jezeh (Persian: جزه) (Note: Also romanized as Jazeh; also known as Jaz) is a village in, and the capital of, Jabal Rural District in Tudeshk District (Note: Formerly Kuhpayeh District of Isfahan County) of Kuhpayeh County, Isfahan province, Iran.

== Demographics ==
=== Population ===
At the time of the 2006 National Census, the village's population was 646 in 205 households, when it was in Kuhpayeh District (Note: Renamed Tudeshk District of Kuhpayeh County) of Isfahan County. The following census in 2011 counted 674 people in 221 households. The 2016 census measured the population of the village as 835 people in 286 households. It was the most populous village in its rural district.

In 2021, the district was separated from the county in the establishment of Kuhpayeh County and renamed Tudeshk District.
