= Musaabad, Isfahan =

Village in Isfahan province, Iran

Musaabad Persian: موسي اباد
- Village
- Location within Iran
- Coordinates: 32°48′33″N 52°29′52″E
- Country: Iran
- Province: Isfahan
- County: Kuhpayeh
- District: Tudeshk
- Rural District: Jabal

Population (2016)
  - Total: Below reporting threshold
- Time zone: UTC+3:30 (IRST)

Musaabad (Persian: موسي اباد) (Note: Also romanized as Mūsáābād; also known as Mūsīān) is a village in Jabal Rural District of Tudeshk District (Note: Formerly Kuhpayeh District of Isfahan County) in Kuhpayeh County, Isfahan province, Iran.

== Demographics ==
=== Population ===
At the time of the 2006 National Census, the village's population was 16 in four households, when it was in Kuhpayeh District (Note: Renamed Tudeshk District of Kuhpayeh County) of Isfahan County. The following censuses in 2011 and 2016 counted a population below the reporting threshold.

In 2021, the district was separated from the county in the establishment of Kuhpayeh County and renamed Tudeshk District.
