= Mir Lotfollah =

Village in Isfahan province, Iran

Mir Lotfollah Persian: ميرلطف اله
- Village
- Location within Iran
- Coordinates: 32°44′35″N 52°47′38″E
- Country: Iran
- Province: Isfahan
- County: Kuhpayeh
- District: Tudeshk
- Rural District: Tudeshk

Population (2016)
  - Total: 29
- Time zone: UTC+3:30 (IRST)

Mir Lotfollah (Persian: ميرلطف الله) (Note: Also romanized as Mīr Loţfollāh and Mīrlotfollāh) is a village in Tudeshk Rural District of Tudeshk District (Note: Formerly Kuhpayeh District of Isfahan County) in Kuhpayeh County, Isfahan province, Iran.

== Demographics ==
=== Population ===
At the time of the 2006 National Census, the village's population was 15 in seven households, when it was in Kuhpayeh District (Note: Renamed Tudeshk District of Kuhpayeh County) of Isfahan County. The following census in 2011 counted 13 people in eight households. The 2016 census measured the population of the village as 29 people in 13 households.

In 2021, the district was separated from the county in the establishment of Kuhpayeh County and renamed Tudeshk District.
