= Haft Yaran =

Village in Isfahan province, Iran

Haft Yaran Persian: هفت ياران
- Village
- Location within Iran
- Coordinates: 32°41′14″N 52°44′20″E
- Country: Iran
- Province: Isfahan
- County: Kuhpayeh
- District: Tudeshk
- Rural District: Tudeshk

Population (2016)
  - Total: 19
- Time zone: UTC+3:30 (IRST)

Haft Yaran (Persian: هفت ياران) (Note: Also romanized as Haft Yārān) is a village in Tudeshk Rural District of Tudeshk District (Note: Formerly Kuhpayeh District of Isfahan County) in Kuhpayeh County, Isfahan province, Iran.

== Demographics ==
=== Population ===
At the time of the 2006 National Census, the village's population was 32 in eight households, when it was in Kuhpayeh District (Note: Renamed Tudeshk District of Kuhpayeh County) of Isfahan County. The following census in 2011 counted 23 people in six households. The 2016 census measured the population of the village as 19 people in six households.

In 2021, the district was separated from the county in the establishment of Kuhpayeh County and renamed Tudeshk District.
