= Eyshabad, Isfahan =

Village in Isfahan province, Iran

Eyshabad Persian: عيش اباد
- Village
- Location within Iran
- Country: Iran
- Province: Isfahan
- County: Kuhpayeh
- District: Tudeshk
- Rural District: Tudeshk

Population (2016)
  - Total: 94
- Time zone: UTC+3:30 (IRST)

Eyshabad (Persian: عيش اباد) (Note: Also romanized as ‘Eyshābād) is a village in Tudeshk Rural District of Tudeshk District (Note: Formerly Kuhpayeh District of Isfahan County) in Kuhpayeh County, Isfahan province, Iran.

== Demographics ==
=== Population ===
At the time of the 2006 National Census, the village's population was 71 in 20 households, when it was in Kuhpayeh District (Note: Renamed Tudeshk District of Kuhpayeh County) of Isfahan County. The following census in 2011 counted 69 people in 20 households. The 2016 census measured the population of the village as 94 people in 33 households.

In 2021, the district was separated from the county in the establishment of Kuhpayeh County and renamed Tudeshk District.
