= Zefreh, Sistan =

Village in Isfahan province, Iran

Zefreh Persian: زفره
- Village
- Location within Iran
- Coordinates: 32°54′11″N 52°17′11″E
- Country: Iran
- Province: Isfahan
- County: Kuhpayeh
- District: Sistan
- Rural District: Zefreh

Population (2016)
  - Total: 1,750
- Time zone: UTC+3:30 (IRST)
- Website: www.zefreh.com

Zefreh (Persian: زفره) (Note: Also known as Zifreh) is a village in, and the capital of, Zefreh Rural District in Sistan District of Kuhpayeh County, Isfahan province, Iran.

== Demographics ==
=== Population ===
At the time of the 2006 National Census, the village's population was 1,689 in 581 households, when it was in Kuhpayeh District (Note: Renamed Tudeshk District of Kuhpayeh County) of Isfahan County. The following census in 2011 counted 1,555 people in 598 households. The 2016 census measured the population of the village as 1,750 people in 639 households, the most populous in its rural district.

In 2021, the district was separated from the county in the establishment of Kuhpayeh County and renamed Tudeshk District. The rural district was transferred to the new Sistan District.

== Overview ==
Zefreh has a congregational mosque from the Saljuq era with subsequent renovations. Zefreh has four chains of subterranean channels (qanat). Most of the population is engaged in farming, herding, and gardening and horticulture. Agricultural products are wheat, almonds, mulberries, and especially corn. Weaving carpets, carrying the Nain design, was particular to women, who were also engaged in other cottage industries. A distinguished local industry used to be making cotton shoes.
