= Abchuiyeh =

Village in Isfahan province, Iran

Abchuiyeh Persian: اب چوئيه
- Village
- Location within Iran
- Coordinates: 32°40′58″N 52°47′26″E
- Country: Iran
- Province: Isfahan
- County: Kuhpayeh
- District: Tudeshk
- Rural District: Tudeshk

Population (2016)
  - Total: 45
- Time zone: UTC+3:30 (IRST)

Abchuiyeh (Persian: اب چوئيه) (Note: Also romanized as Ābchū’īyeh; also known as Āb Chūbeh and Āb Chuya) is a village in Tudeshk Rural District of Tudeshk District (Note: Formerly Kuhpayeh District of Isfahan County) in Kuhpayeh County, Isfahan province, Iran.

== Demographics ==
=== Population ===
At the time of the 2006 National Census, the village's population was 60 in 18 households, when it was in Kuhpayeh District (Note: Renamed Tudeshk District of Kuhpayeh County) of Isfahan County. The following census in 2011 counted 52 people in 15 households. The 2016 census measured the population of the village as 45 people in 17 households.

In 2021, the district was separated from the county in the establishment of Kuhpayeh County and renamed Tudeshk District.
