= Hekmatestan =

Village in Isfahan province, Iran

Hekmatestan Persian: حكمتستان
- Village
- Location within Iran
- Country: Iran
- Province: Isfahan
- County: Kuhpayeh
- District: Tudeshk
- Rural District: Tudeshk

Population (2016)
  - Total: 21
- Time zone: UTC+3:30 (IRST)

Hekmatestan (Persian: حكمتستان) (Note: Also romanized as Ḩekmatestān and Ḩekmatsetān; also known as Ḩekmatān and Ḩokmestān) is a village in Tudeshk Rural District of Tudeshk District (Note: Formerly Kuhpayeh District of Isfahan County) in Kuhpayeh County, Isfahan province, Iran.

== Demographics ==
=== Population ===
At the time of the 2006 National Census, the village's population was 28 in six households, when it was in Kuhpayeh District (Note: Renamed Tudeshk District of Kuhpayeh County) of Isfahan County. The following census in 2011 counted 19 people in five households. The 2016 census measured the population of the village as 21 people in six households.

In 2021, the district was separated from the county in the establishment of Kuhpayeh County and renamed Tudeshk District.
