= Jondabeh =

Village in Isfahan province, Iran

Jondabeh Persian: جندابه
- Village
- Location within Iran
- Coordinates: 32°46′19″N 52°39′39″E
- Country: Iran
- Province: Isfahan
- County: Kuhpayeh
- District: Tudeshk
- Rural District: Tudeshk

Population (2016)
  - Total: 398
- Time zone: UTC+3:30 (IRST)

Jondabeh (Persian: جندابه) (Note: Also romanized as Jondābeh) is a village in Tudeshk Rural District of Tudeshk District (Note: Formerly Kuhpayeh District of Isfahan County) in Kuhpayeh County, Isfahan province, Iran.

== Demographics ==
=== Population ===
At the time of the 2006 National Census, the village's population was 391 in 110 households, when it was in Kuhpayeh District (Note: Renamed Tudeshk District of Kuhpayeh County) of Isfahan County. The following census in 2011 counted 335 people in 108 households. The 2016 census measured the population of the village as 398 people in 133 households.

In 2021, the district was separated from the county in the establishment of Kuhpayeh County and renamed Tudeshk District.
