= Dakhrabad =

Village in Isfahan province, Iran

Dakhrabad Persian: دخراباد
- Village
- Location within Iran
- Coordinates: 32°47′19″N 52°32′25″E
- Country: Iran
- Province: Isfahan
- County: Kuhpayeh
- District: Tudeshk
- Rural District: Jabal

Population (2016)
  - Total: 79
- Time zone: UTC+3:30 (IRST)

Dakhrabad (Persian: دخراباد) (Note: Also romanized as Dakharābād, Dakherābād, and Dakhrābād) is a village in Jabal Rural District of Tudeshk District (Note: Formerly Kuhpayeh District of Isfahan County) in Kuhpayeh County, Isfahan province, Iran.

== Demographics ==
=== Population ===
At the time of the 2006 National Census, the village's population was 99 in 48 households, when it was in Kuhpayeh District (Note: Renamed Tudeshk District of Kuhpayeh County) of Isfahan County. The following census in 2011 counted 52 people in 21 households. The 2016 census measured the population of the village as 79 people in 37 households.

In 2021, the district was separated from the county in the establishment of Kuhpayeh County and renamed Tudeshk District.
