= Key, Iran =

Village in Isfahan province, Iran

Key Persian: كي
- Village
- Location within Iran
- Coordinates: 32°46′19″N 52°38′53″E
- Country: Iran
- Province: Isfahan
- County: Kuhpayeh
- District: Tudeshk
- Rural District: Tudeshk

Population (2016)
  - Total: 18
- Time zone: UTC+3:30 (IRST)

Key (Persian: كي) (Note: Also known as Keh) is a village in Tudeshk Rural District of Tudeshk District (Note: Formerly Kuhpayeh District of Isfahan County) in Kuhpayeh County, Isfahan province, Iran.

== Demographics ==
=== Population ===
At the time of the 2006 National Census, the village's population was 36 in nine households, when it was in Kuhpayeh District (Note: Renamed Tudeshk District of Kuhpayeh County) of Isfahan County. The following census in 2011 counted 24 people in seven households. The 2016 census measured the population of the village as 18 people in eight households.

In 2021, the district was separated from the county in the establishment of Kuhpayeh County and renamed Tudeshk District.
