= Ab Kharak =

Village in Isfahan province, Iran

Ab Kharak Persian: اب خارك
- Village
- Location within Iran
- Coordinates: 32°47′21″N 52°28′20″E
- Country: Iran
- Province: Isfahan
- County: Kuhpayeh
- District: Tudeshk
- Rural District: Jabal

Population (2016)
  - Total: 241
- Time zone: UTC+3:30 (IRST)

Ab Kharak (Persian: اب خارك) (Note: Also romanized as Āb Khārak; also known as Ānjārak) is a village in Jabal Rural District of Tudeshk District (Note: Formerly Kuhpayeh District of Isfahan County) in Kuhpayeh County, Isfahan province, Iran.

== Demographics ==
=== Population ===
At the time of the 2006 National Census, the village's population was 60 in nine households, when it was in Kuhpayeh District (Note: Renamed Tudeshk District of Kuhpayeh County) of Isfahan County. The following census in 2011 counted 19 people in six households. The 2016 census measured the population of the village as 241 people in 64 households.

In 2021, the district was separated from the county in the establishment of Kuhpayeh County and renamed Tudeshk District.
