= Bidabad, Isfahan =

Village in Isfahan province, Iran

Bidabad Persian: بيداباد
- Village
- Location within Iran
- Country: Iran
- Province: Isfahan
- County: Kuhpayeh
- District: Tudeshk
- Rural District: Tudeshk

Population (2016)
  - Total: 17
- Time zone: UTC+3:30 (IRST)

Bidabad (Persian: بيداباد) (Note: Also romanized as Bīdābād) is a village in Tudeshk Rural District of Tudeshk District (Note: Formerly Kuhpayeh District of Isfahan County) in Kuhpayeh County, Isfahan province, Iran.

== Demographics ==
=== Population ===
At the time of the 2006 National Census, the village's population was 27 in four households, when it was in Kuhpayeh District (Note: Renamed Tudeshk District of Kuhpayeh County) of Isfahan County. The following census in 2011 counted 25 people in five households. The 2016 census measured the population of the village as 17 people in four households.

In 2021, the district was separated from the county in the establishment of Kuhpayeh County and renamed Tudeshk District.
