= Vaj, Isfahan =

Village in Isfahan province, Iran

Vaj Persian: وج
- Village
- Location within Iran
- Coordinates: 32°45′12″N 52°43′59″E
- Country: Iran
- Province: Isfahan
- County: Kuhpayeh
- District: Tudeshk
- Rural District: Tudeshk

Population (2016)
  - Total: 55
- Time zone: UTC+3:30 (IRST)

Vaj (Persian: وج) (Note: Also known as Wajeh) is a village in Tudeshk Rural District of Tudeshk District (Note: Formerly Kuhpayeh District of Isfahan County) in Kuhpayeh County, Isfahan province, Iran.

== Demographics ==
=== Population ===
At the time of the 2006 National Census, the village's population was 43 in 15 households, when it was in Kuhpayeh District (Note: Renamed Tudeshk District of Kuhpayeh County) of Isfahan County. The following census in 2011 counted 36 people in 19 households. The 2016 census measured the population of the village as 55 people in 23 households.

In 2021, the district was separated from the county in the establishment of Kuhpayeh County and renamed Tudeshk District.
