= Tutchi =

Village in Isfahan province, Iran

Tutchi Persian: توتچي
- Village
- Location within Iran
- Country: Iran
- Province: Isfahan
- County: Kuhpayeh
- District: Tudeshk
- Rural District: Tudeshk

Population (2016)
  - Total: 25
- Time zone: UTC+3:30 (IRST)

Tutchi (Persian: توتچي) (Note: Also romanized as Tūtchī; also known as Ţūţchī-ye ‘Olyā) is a village in Tudeshk Rural District of Tudeshk District (Note: Formerly Kuhpayeh District of Isfahan County) in Kuhpayeh County, Isfahan province, Iran.

== Demographics ==
=== Population ===
At the time of the 2006 National Census, the village's population was 47 in 10 households, when it was in Kuhpayeh District (Note: Renamed Tudeshk District of Kuhpayeh County) of Isfahan County. The following census in 2011 counted 19 people in five households. The 2016 census measured the population of the village as 25 people in seven households.

In 2021, the district was separated from the county in the establishment of Kuhpayeh County and renamed Tudeshk District.
