= Seyyedabad, Kuhpayeh =

Village in Isfahan province, Iran

Seyyedabad Persian: سيداباد
- Village
- Location within Iran
- Coordinates: 32°45′24″N 52°46′57″E
- Country: Iran
- Province: Isfahan
- County: Kuhpayeh
- District: Tudeshk
- Rural District: Tudeshk

Population (2016)
  - Total: 43
- Time zone: UTC+3:30 (IRST)

Seyyedabad (Persian: سيداباد) (Note: Also romanized as Seyyedābād) is a village in Tudeshk Rural District of Tudeshk District (Note: Formerly Kuhpayeh District of Isfahan County) in Kuhpayeh County, Isfahan province, Iran.

== Demographics ==
=== Population ===
At the time of the 2006 National Census, the village's population was 25 in 14 households, when it was in Kuhpayeh District (Note: Renamed Tudeshk District of Kuhpayeh County) of Isfahan County. The following census in 2011 counted 24 people in 11 households. The 2016 census measured the population of the village as 43 people in 15 households.

In 2021, the district was separated from the county in the establishment of Kuhpayeh County and renamed Tudeshk District.
