= Kharzanan =

Village in Isfahan province, Iran

Kharzanan Persian: خارزنان
- Village
- Location within Iran
- Country: Iran
- Province: Isfahan
- County: Kuhpayeh
- District: Tudeshk
- Rural District: Tudeshk

Population (2016)
  - Total: 47
- Time zone: UTC+3:30 (IRST)

Kharzanan (Persian: خارزنان) (Note: Also romanized as Khār Zanān and Khārzanān; also known as Kahār Zanān) is a village in Tudeshk Rural District of Tudeshk District (Note: Formerly Kuhpayeh District of Isfahan County) in Kuhpayeh County, Isfahan province, Iran.

== Demographics ==
=== Population ===
At the time of the 2006 National Census, the village's population was 55 in 20 households, when it was in Kuhpayeh District (Note: Renamed Tudeshk District of Kuhpayeh County) of Isfahan County. The following census in 2011 counted 52 people in 19 households. The 2016 census measured the population of the village as 47 people in 18 households.

In 2021, the district was separated from the county in the establishment of Kuhpayeh County and renamed Tudeshk District.
