= Atr Afshan =

Village in Isfahan province, Iran

Atr Afshan Persian: عطرافشان
- Village
- Location within Iran
- Coordinates: 32°43′04″N 52°48′00″E
- Country: Iran
- Province: Isfahan
- County: Kuhpayeh
- District: Tudeshk
- Rural District: Tudeshk

Population (2016)
  - Total: 7
- Time zone: UTC+3:30 (IRST)

Atr Afshan (Persian: عطرافشان) (Note: Also romanized as ‘Aţr Afshān) is a village in Tudeshk Rural District of Tudeshk District (Note: Formerly Kuhpayeh District of Isfahan County) in Kuhpayeh County, Isfahan province, Iran.

== Demographics ==
=== Population ===
At the time of the 2006 National Census, the village's population was 20 in nine households, when it was in Kuhpayeh District (Note: Renamed Tudeshk District of Kuhpayeh County) of Isfahan County. The following census in 2011 counted eight people in six households. The 2016 census measured the population of the village as seven people in five households.

In 2021, the district was separated from the county in the establishment of Kuhpayeh County and renamed Tudeshk District.
