= Borzabad, Kuhpayeh =

Village in Isfahan province, Iran

Borzabad Persian: برزاباد
- Village
- Location within Iran
- Country: Iran
- Province: Isfahan
- County: Kuhpayeh
- District: Tudeshk
- Rural District: Tudeshk

Population (2016)
  - Total: 27
- Time zone: UTC+3:30 (IRST)

Borzabad (Persian: برزاباد) (Note: Also romanized as Barzabad, Barzābād, and Borzābād) is a village in Tudeshk Rural District of Tudeshk District (Note: Formerly Kuhpayeh District of Isfahan County) in Kuhpayeh County, Isfahan province, Iran.

== Demographics ==
=== Population ===
At the time of the 2006 National Census, the village's population was 38 in 12 households, when it was in Kuhpayeh District (Note: Renamed Tudeshk District of Kuhpayeh County) of Isfahan County. The following census in 2011 counted 23 people in 11 households. The 2016 census measured the population of the village as 27 people in 12 households.

In 2021, the district was separated from the county in the establishment of Kuhpayeh County and renamed Tudeshk District.
