= Karimabad, Kuhpayeh =

Village in Isfahan province, Iran

Karimabad Persian: كريم اباد
- Village
- Location within Iran
- Coordinates: 32°48′19″N 52°35′21″E
- Country: Iran
- Province: Isfahan
- County: Kuhpayeh
- District: Tudeshk
- Rural District: Jabal

Population (2016)
  - Total: 8
- Time zone: UTC+3:30 (IRST)

Karimabad (Persian: كريم اباد) (Note: Also romanized as Karīmābād) is a village in Jabal Rural District of Tudeshk District (Note: Formerly Kuhpayeh District of Isfahan County) in Kuhpayeh County, Isfahan province, Iran.

== Demographics ==
=== Population ===
At the time of the 2006 National Census, the village's population was 18 in five households, when it was in Kuhpayeh District (Note: Renamed Tudeshk District of Kuhpayeh County) of Isfahan County. The following census in 2011 counted 15 people in five households. The 2016 census measured the population of the village as eight people in four households.

In 2021, the district was separated from the county in the establishment of Kuhpayeh County and renamed Tudeshk District.
