= Delgosha, Isfahan =

Village in Isfahan province, Iran

Delgosha Persian: دلگشا
- Village
- Location within Iran
- Coordinates: 32°44′34″N 52°46′54″E
- Country: Iran
- Province: Isfahan
- County: Kuhpayeh
- District: Tudeshk
- Rural District: Tudeshk

Population (2016)
  - Total: 113
- Time zone: UTC+3:30 (IRST)

Delgosha (Persian: دلگشا) (Note: Also romanized as Delgoshā) is a village in Tudeshk Rural District of Tudeshk District (Note: Formerly Kuhpayeh District of Isfahan County) in Kuhpayeh County, Isfahan province, Iran.

== Demographics ==
=== Population ===
At the time of the 2006 National Census, the village's population was 34 in 17 households, when it was in Kuhpayeh District (Note: Renamed Tudeshk District of Kuhpayeh County) of Isfahan County. The following census in 2011 counted 45 people in 24 households. The 2016 census measured the population of the village as 113 people in 47 households.

In 2021, the district was separated from the county in the establishment of Kuhpayeh County and renamed Tudeshk District.
