= Darreh Shah Nazar =

Village in Isfahan province, Iran

Darreh Shah Nazar Persian: دره شاه نظر
- Village
- Location within Iran
- Coordinates: 32°41′07″N 52°45′38″E
- Country: Iran
- Province: Isfahan
- County: Kuhpayeh
- District: Tudeshk
- Rural District: Tudeshk

Population (2016)
  - Total: 14
- Time zone: UTC+3:30 (IRST)

Darreh Shah Nazar (Persian: دره شاه نظر) (Note: Also romanized as Darreh Shāh Naz̧ar and Darreh-ye Shāh Naz̧ar) is a village in Tudeshk Rural District of Tudeshk District (Note: Formerly Kuhpayeh District of Isfahan County) in Kuhpayeh County, Isfahan province, Iran.

== Demographics ==
=== Population ===
At the time of the 2006 National Census, the village's population was 32 in nine households, when it was in Kuhpayeh District (Note: Renamed Tudeshk District of Kuhpayeh County) of Isfahan County. The following census in 2011 counted 22 people in eight households. The 2016 census measured the population of the village as 14 people in seven households.

In 2021, the district was separated from the county in the establishment of Kuhpayeh County and renamed Tudeshk District.
