= Emamzadeh Qasem, Isfahan =

Village in Isfahan province, Iran

Emamzadeh Qasem Persian: امامزاده قاسم
- Village
- Location within Iran
- Coordinates: 32°41′55″N 52°35′52″E
- Country: Iran
- Province: Isfahan
- County: Kuhpayeh
- District: Tudeshk
- Rural District: Tudeshk

Population (2016)
  - Total: 445
- Time zone: UTC+3:30 (IRST)

Emamzadeh Qasem (Persian: امامزاده قاسم) (Note: Also romanized as Emāmzādeh Qāsem) is a village in Tudeshk Rural District of Tudeshk District (Note: Formerly Kuhpayeh District of Isfahan County) in Kuhpayeh County, Isfahan province, Iran.

== Demographics ==
=== Population ===
At the time of the 2006 National Census, the village's population was 437 in 131 households, when it was in Kuhpayeh District (Note: Renamed Tudeshk District of Kuhpayeh County) of Isfahan County. The following census in 2011 counted 408 people in 138 households. The 2016 census measured the population of the village as 445 people in 152 households.

In 2021, the district was separated from the county in the establishment of Kuhpayeh County and renamed Tudeshk District.
