= Mir Jafar, Iran =

Village in Isfahan province, Iran

Mir Jafar Persian: ميرجعفر
- Village
- Location within Iran
- Coordinates: 32°45′24″N 52°34′03″E
- Country: Iran
- Province: Isfahan
- County: Kuhpayeh
- District: Tudeshk
- Rural District: Jabal

Population (2016)
  - Total: 55
- Time zone: UTC+3:30 (IRST)

Mir Jafar (Persian: ميرجعفر) (Note: Also romanized as Mīr Ja‘far) is a village in Jabal Rural District of Tudeshk District (Note: Formerly Kuhpayeh District of Isfahan County) in Kuhpayeh County, Isfahan province, Iran.

== Demographics ==
=== Population ===
At the time of the 2006 National Census, the village's population was 92 in 26 households, when it was in Kuhpayeh District (Note: Renamed Tudeshk District of Kuhpayeh County) of Isfahan County. The following census in 2011 counted 55 people in 19 households. The 2016 census measured the population of the village as 55 people in 22 households.

In 2021, the district was separated from the county in the establishment of Kuhpayeh County and renamed Tudeshk District.
