= Kichi, Jabal =

Village in Isfahan province, Iran

Kichi Persian: كيچي
- Village
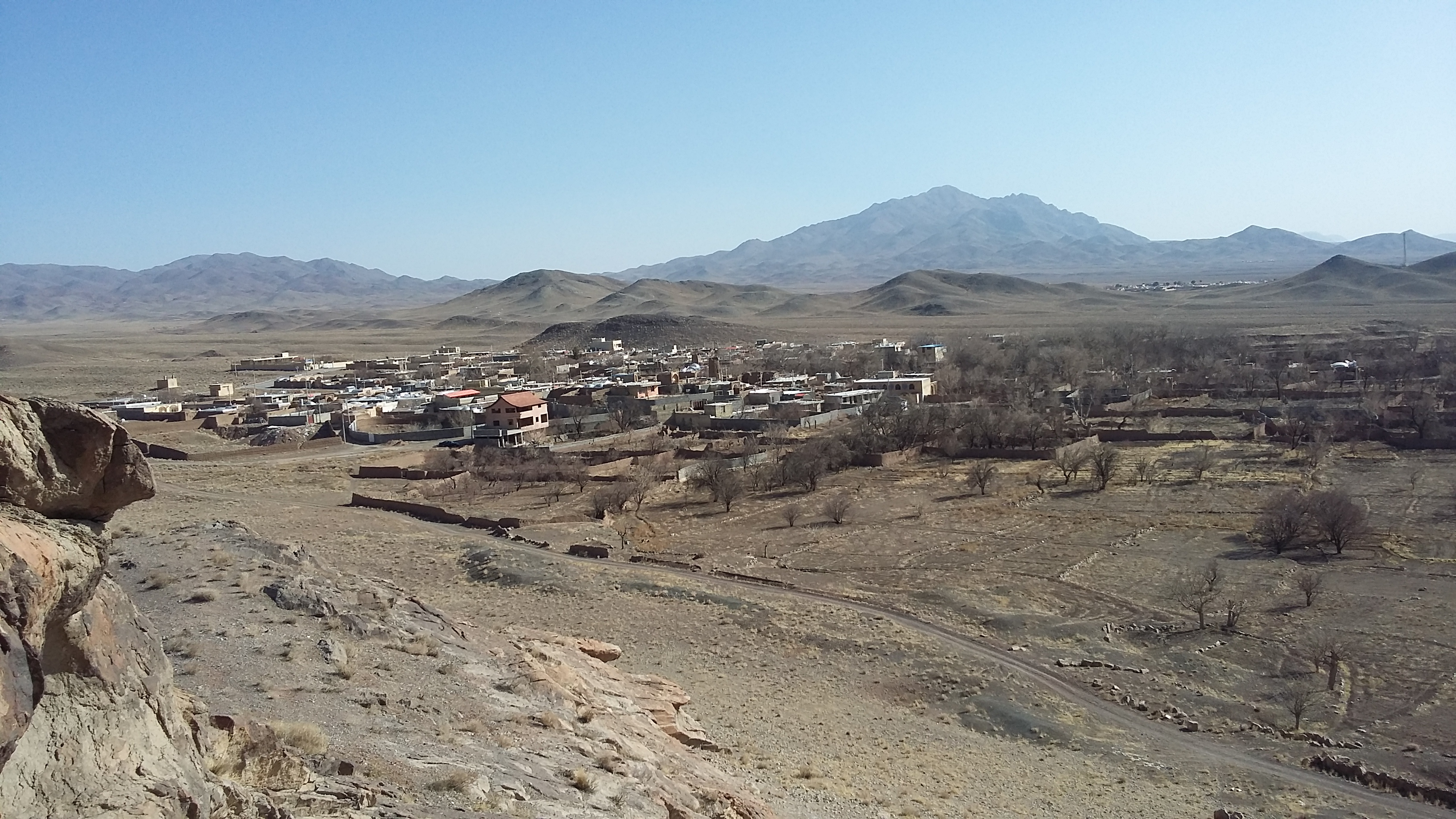
- The village of Kichi

- Location within Iran
- Coordinates: 32°49′11″N 52°29′48″E
- Country: Iran
- Province: Isfahan
- County: Kuhpayeh
- District: Tudeshk
- Rural District: Jabal

Population (2016)
  - Total: 92
- Time zone: UTC+3:30 (IRST)

Kichi (Persian: كيچي) (Note: Also romanized as Kīchī; also known as Kechī and Kirichi) is a village in Jabal Rural District of Tudeshk District (Note: Formerly Kuhpayeh District of Isfahan County) in Kuhpayeh County, Isfahan province, Iran.

== Demographics ==
=== Population ===
At the time of the 2006 National Census, the village's population was 63 in 35 households, when it was in Kuhpayeh District (Note: Renamed Tudeshk District of Kuhpayeh County) of Isfahan County. The following census in 2011 counted 25 people in 15 households. The 2016 census measured the population of the village as 92 people in 34 households.

In 2021, the district was separated from the county in the establishment of Kuhpayeh County and renamed Tudeshk District.
