= Chirman-e Olya =

Village in Isfahan province, Iran

Chirman-e Olya Persian: چيرمان عليا
- Village
- Location within Iran
- Coordinates: 32°40′42″N 52°44′59″E
- Country: Iran
- Province: Isfahan
- County: Kuhpayeh
- District: Tudeshk
- Rural District: Tudeshk

Population (2016)
  - Total: 131
- Time zone: UTC+3:30 (IRST)

Chirman-e Olya (Persian: چيرمان عليا) (Note: Also romanized as Chīrmān-e ‘Olyā; also known as Chermān and Chīrmān) is a village in Tudeshk Rural District of Tudeshk District (Note: Formerly Kuhpayeh District of Isfahan County) in Kuhpayeh County, Isfahan province, Iran.

== Demographics ==
=== Population ===
At the time of the 2006 National Census, the village's population was 140 in 33 households, when it was in Kuhpayeh District (Note: Renamed Tudeshk District of Kuhpayeh County) of Isfahan County. The following census in 2011 counted 102 people in 31 households. The 2016 census measured the population of the village as 131 people in 40 households.

In 2021, the district was separated from the county in the establishment of Kuhpayeh County and renamed Tudeshk District.
