= Chirman =

Chirman (Persian: چيرمان), also rendered as Cherman, may refer to:

- Chirman-e Olya
- Chirman-e Sofla

== See also ==
- 6981 Chirman, an asteroid
