= Zefreh =

Zefreh or Zafreh (Persian: زفره) may refer to:

- Zefreh, Isfahan
- Zafreh, Falavarjan, Isfahan Province
- Zefreh Rural District, in Isfahan County
