= Meshkenan =

Meshkenan or Moshkenan (Persian: مشكنان) may refer to:

- Moshkenan, Isfahan
- Meshkenan, Kerman
