= Moshkenan, Isfahan =

Village in Isfahan province, Iran

Moshkenan Persian: مشكنان
- Village
- Location within Iran
- Coordinates: 32°43′03″N 52°36′39″E
- Country: Iran
- Province: Isfahan
- County: Kuhpayeh
- District: Tudeshk
- Rural District: Tudeshk

Population (2016)
  - Total: 506
- Time zone: UTC+3:30 (IRST)

Moshkenan (Persian: مشكنان) (Note: Also romanized as Moshkenān; also known as Mashgenān, Moshgenān, Moshgnan, Mūshkānān, and Mushkinān) is a village in Tudeshk Rural District of Tudeshk District (Note: Formerly Kuhpayeh District of Isfahan County) in Kuhpayeh County, Isfahan province, Iran.

== Demographics ==
=== Population ===
At the time of the 2006 National Census, the village's population was 466 in 136 households, when it was in Kuhpayeh District (Note: Renamed Tudeshk District of Kuhpayeh County) of Isfahan County. The following census in 2011 counted 456 people in 139 households. The 2016 census measured the population of the village as 506 people in 173 households. It was the most populous village in its rural district.

In 2021, the district was separated from the county in the establishment of Kuhpayeh County and renamed Tudeshk District.
