= Kuy, Iran =

Kuy (Persian: كوي) in Iran may refer to:

- Kuy-e Golestan
- Kuy-e Lotf
- Kuy-e Rah-e Haq
- Kuy-e Rowshan Shahr
