= Tin Jan =

Village in Isfahan province, Iran

Tin Jan Persian: تينجان
- Village
- Location within Iran
- Coordinates: 32°51′00″N 52°26′44″E
- Country: Iran
- Province: Isfahan
- County: Kuhpayeh
- District: Tudeshk
- Rural District: Jabal

Population (2016)
  - Total: 123
- Time zone: UTC+3:30 (IRST)

Tin Jan (Persian: تينجان) (Note: Also romanized as Tīn Jān) is a village in Jabal Rural District of Tudeshk District (Note: Formerly Kuhpayeh District of Isfahan County) in Kuhpayeh County, Isfahan province, Iran.

== Demographics ==
=== Population ===
At the time of the 2006 National Census, the village's population was 120 in 49 households, when it was in Kuhpayeh District (Note: Renamed Tudeshk District of Kuhpayeh County) of Isfahan County. The following census in 2011 counted 108 people in 37 households. The 2016 census measured the population of the village as 123 people in 39 households.

In 2021, the district was separated from the county in the establishment of Kuhpayeh County and renamed Tudeshk District.
