= Seresh Badaran =

Village in Isfahan province, Iran

Seresh Badaran Persian: سرشبادران
- Village
- Location within Iran
- Coordinates: 32°32′09″N 51°48′47″E
- Country: Iran
- Province: Isfahan
- County: Isfahan
- District: Central
- Rural District: Jey

Population (2016)
  - Total: 2,459
- Time zone: UTC+3:30 (IRST)

Seresh Badaran (Persian: سرشبادران) (Note: Also romanized as Seresh Bāderān and Sereshbādarān; also known as Darān, Seresh Bāzerūn, Sereshk Bādarān, Sorūsh, and Sorūsh Bādarān) is a village in Jey Rural District of the Central District in Isfahan County, Isfahan province, Iran.

== Demographics ==
=== Population ===
At the time of the 2006 National Census, the village's population was 2,101 in 602 households. The following census in 2011 counted 2,449 people in 746 households. The 2016 census measured the population of the village as 2,459 people in 783 households, the most populous in its rural district.
