= Salimi, Isfahan =

Neighborhood in Isfahan province, Iran

Salimi Persian: سليمي
- Neighborhood
- Location within Iran
- Country: Iran
- Province: Isfahan
- County: Isfahan
- District: Central
- City: Isfahan

Population (2011)
  - Total: 97
- Time zone: UTC+3:30 (IRST)

Salimi (Persian: سليمي) (Note: Also romanized as Salīmī) is a neighborhood in the city of Isfahan in the Central District of Isfahan County, Isfahan province, Iran.

== Demographics ==
=== Population ===
At the time of the 2006 National Census, Salimi's population was 103 in 31 households, when it was a village in Jey Rural District. The following census in 2011 counted 97 people in 33 households. After the census, the village was annexed by the city of Isfahan.
