= Jowharan =

Neighborhood in Isfahan province, Iran

Jowharan Persian: جوهران
- Neighborhood
- Location within Iran
- Coordinates: 32°40′33″N 51°44′51″E
- Country: Iran
- Province: Isfahan
- County: Isfahan
- District: Central
- City: Isfahan

Population (2011)
  - Total: 172
- Time zone: UTC+3:30 (IRST)

Jowharan (Persian: جوهران) (Note: Also romanized as Jowharān; also known as Joharānjey) is a neighborhood in the city of Isfahan in the Central District of Isfahan County, Isfahan province, Iran.

== Demographics ==
=== Population ===
At the time of the 2006 National Census, Jowharan's population was 253 in 65 households, when it was a village in Jey Rural District. The following census in 2011 counted 172 people in 48 households. After the census, the village was annexed by the city of Isfahan.
