= Sanjavan Marreh =

Neighborhood in Isfahan province, Iran

Sanjavan Marreh Persian: سنجوان مره
- Neighborhood
- Location within Iran
- Coordinates: 32°37′42″N 51°45′09″E
- Country: Iran
- Province: Isfahan
- County: Isfahan
- District: Central
- City: Isfahan

Population (2011)
  - Total: 1,112
- Time zone: UTC+3:30 (IRST)

Sanjavan Marreh (Persian: سنجوان مره) (Note: Also romanized as Sanjavān Mareh and Sanjavān Marreh; also known as Sanjavān Mareh Jey) is a neighborhood in the city of Isfahan in the Central District of Isfahan County, Isfahan province, Iran.

== Demographics ==
=== Population ===
At the time of the 2006 National Census, Sanjavan Marreh's population was 1,234 in 329 households, when it was a village in Jey Rural District. The following census in 2011 counted 1,112 people in 337 households. After the census, the village was annexed by the city of Isfahan.
