= Pinart =

Pinart may refer to:

People

- Alphonse Pinart (1852–1911), French explorer, philologist, and ethnographer
- Claude Pinart (died 1605), Secretary of State under King Henry III

Places

- Fenart, Isfahan County, Iran
