= Qaleh Sarab =

Village in Isfahan province, Iran

Qaleh Sarab Persian: لعه سراب
- Village
- Location within Iran
- Country: Iran
- Province: Isfahan
- County: Isfahan
- District: Central
- Rural District: Jey

Population (2016)
  - Total: 0
- Time zone: UTC+3:30 (IRST)

Qaleh Sarab (Persian: قلعه سراب) (Note: Also romanized as Qal‘eh Sarāb) is a village in Jey Rural District of the Central District in Isfahan County, Isfahan province, Iran.

== Demographics ==
=== Population ===
At the time of the 2006 National Census, the village's population was 30 in six households. The following census in 2011 counted 44 people in eight households. The 2016 census measured the population of the village as zero.
