= Raran, Iran =

Neighborhood in Isfahan province, Iran

Raran Persian: راران
- Neighborhood
- Location within Iran
- Coordinates: 32°40′35″N 51°45′12″E
- Country: Iran
- Province: Isfahan
- County: Isfahan
- District: Central
- City: Isfahan

Population (2011)
  - Total: 1,829
- Time zone: UTC+3:30 (IRST)

Raran (Persian: راران) (Note: Also romanized as Rārān; also known as Rādān and Rārān Qahāb) is a neighborhood in the city of Isfahan in the Central District of Isfahan County, Isfahan province, Iran.

== Demographics ==
=== Population ===
At the time of the 2006 National Census, Raran's population was 2,032 in 554 households, when it was a village in Jey Rural District. The following census in 2011 counted 1,829 people in 552 households. After the census, the village was annexed by the city of Isfahan.
