= Qaleh-ye Bertianchi =

Neighborhood in Isfahan province, Iran

Qaleh-ye Bertianchi Persian: قلعه برتيانچي
- Neighborhood
- Location within Iran
- Coordinates: 32°38′02″N 51°45′19″E
- Country: Iran
- Province: Isfahan
- County: Isfahan
- District: Central
- City: Isfahan

Population (2011)
  - Total: 954
- Time zone: UTC+3:30 (IRST)

Qaleh-ye Bertianchi (Persian: قلعه برتيانچي){{efn|Also romanized as Qal‘eh-ye Bertīānchī is a neighborhood in the city of Isfahan in the Central District of Isfahan County, Isfahan province, Iran.

== Demographics ==
=== Population ===
At the time of the 2006 National Census, Qaleh-ye Bertianchi's population was 1,023 in 269 households, when it was a village in Jey Rural District. The following census in 2011 counted 954 people in 282 households. After the census, the village was annexed by the city of Isfahan.
