= Kalamkharan =

Neighborhood in Isfahan province, Iran

Kalamkharan Persian: كلم خواران
- Neighborhood
- Location within Iran
- Coordinates: 32°37′29″N 51°44′45″E
- Country: Iran
- Province: Isfahan
- County: Isfahan
- District: Central
- City: Isfahan

Population (2011)
  - Total: 596
- Time zone: UTC+3:30 (IRST)

Kalamkharan (Persian: كلم خواران) (Note: Also romanized as Kalamkhārān, Kalamkhvaran, and Kalamkhvārān; also known as Kalameh Khūrān, Kalameh Khvārān, and Kalman Khvārān) is a neighborhood in the city of Isfahan in the Central District of Isfahan County, Isfahan province, Iran.

== Demographics ==
=== Population ===
At the time of the 2006 National Census, as a village in Jey Rural District, Kalamkharan's population was 697 in 189 households. The following census, in 2011, counted 596 people in 170 households. After the census, the village was annexed by the city of Isfahan.
