= Zardanjan =

Village in Isfahan province, Iran

Zardanjan Persian: زردنجان
- Village
- Location within Iran
- Coordinates: 32°33′48″N 51°47′13″E
- Country: Iran
- Province: Isfahan
- County: Isfahan
- District: Central
- Rural District: Jey

Population (2016)
  - Total: 712
- Time zone: UTC+3:30 (IRST)

Zardanjan (Persian: زردنجان) (Note: Also romanized as Zardanjān and Zardenjan; also known as Zardanjān Jey) is a village in Jey Rural District of the Central District in Isfahan County, Isfahan province, Iran.

== Demographics ==
=== Population ===
At the time of the 2006 National Census, the village's population was 697 in 188 households. The following census in 2011 counted 797 people in 232 households. The 2016 census measured the population of the village as 712 people in 221 households.
