= Atasharan =

Neighborhood in Isfahan province, Iran

Atasharan Persian: اتشاران
- Neighborhood
- Location within Iran
- Coordinates: 32°40′06″N 51°44′10″E
- Country: Iran
- Province: Isfahan
- County: Isfahan
- District: Central
- City: Isfahan

Population (2011)
  - Total: 1,619
- Time zone: UTC+3:30 (IRST)

Atasharan (Persian: اتشاران) (Note: Also romanized as Ātashārān) is a neighborhood in the city of Isfahan in the Central District of Isfahan County, Isfahan province, Iran.

== Demographics ==
=== Population ===
At the time of the 2006 National Census, Atasharan's population was 1,500 in 380 households, when it was a village in Jey Rural District. The following census in 2011 counted 1,619 people in 471 households. After the census, the village was annexed by the city of Isfahan.
