= Histan =

Neighborhood in Isfahan province, Iran

Histan Persian: هيستان
- Neighborhood
- Location within Iran
- Coordinates: 32°38′01″N 51°44′53″E
- Country: Iran
- Province: Isfahan
- County: Isfahan
- District: Central
- City: Isfahan

Population (2011)
  - Total: 458
- Time zone: UTC+3:30 (IRST)

Histan (Persian: هيستان) (Note: Also Romanized as Hīstān; also known as Hīsūn and ‘Īsūn) is a neighborhood in the city of Isfahan in the Central District of Isfahan County, Isfahan province, Iran.

== Demographics ==
=== Population ===
At the time of the 2006 National Census, Histan's population was 440 in 106 households, when it was a village in Jey Rural District. The following census in 2011 counted 458 people in 143 households. After the census, the village was annexed by the city of Isfahan.
