= Rowshan Dasht =

Neighborhood in Isfahan province, Iran

Rowshan Dasht Persian: روشن دشت
- Neighborhood
- Location within Iran
- Coordinates: 32°36′25″N 51°45′37″E
- Country: Iran
- Province: Isfahan
- County: Isfahan
- District: Central
- City: Isfahan

Population (2011)
  - Total: 72
- Time zone: UTC+3:30 (IRST)

Rowshan Dasht (Persian: روشن دشت) (Note: Also known as Rowshan Shahr) is a neighborhood in the city of Isfahan in the Central District of Isfahan County, Isfahan province, Iran.

== Demographics ==
=== Population ===
At the time of the 2006 National Census, Rowshan Dasht's population was 269 in 80 households, when it was a village in Jey Rural District. The following census in 2011 counted 72 people in 27 households. After the census, the village was annexed by the city of Isfahan.
