= Zavan =

Neighborhood in Isfahan province, Iran

Zavan Persian: زوان
- Neighborhood
- Location within Iran
- Coordinates: 32°37′03″N 51°45′16″E
- Country: Iran
- Province: Isfahan
- County: Isfahan
- District: Central
- City: Isfahan

Population (2011)
  - Total: 929
- Time zone: UTC+3:30 (IRST)

Zavan (Persian: زوان) (Note: Also romanized as Zavān; also known as Zavān Jey, Zāvon, and Zūn) is a neighborhood in the city of Isfahan in the Central District of Isfahan County, Isfahan province, Iran.

== Demographics ==
=== Population ===
At the time of the 2006 National Census, Zavan's population was 844 in 229 households, when it was a village in Jey Rural District. The following census in 2011 counted 929 people in 274 households. After the census, the village was annexed by the city of Isfahan.
