= Molana Safi =

Village in Isfahan province, Iran

Molana Safi Persian: ملاناصفي
- Village
- Location within Iran
- Coordinates: 32°35′11″N 51°46′26″E
- Country: Iran
- Province: Isfahan
- County: Isfahan
- District: Central
- Rural District: Jey

Population (2016)
  - Total: 0
- Time zone: UTC+3:30 (IRST)

Molana Safi (Persian: مولانا صفی) (Note: Also romanized as Molānā Şafī and Molānā Şofī; also known as Maḩalleh-ye Mollā Nāşafī, Molānā Şūfī, Mowlānā Şefī, and Mowlānā Sūfī) is a village in Jey Rural District of the Central District in Isfahan County, Isfahan province, Iran.

== Demographics ==
=== Population ===
At the time of the 2006 National Census, the village's population was 37 in 10 households. The following census in 2011 counted a population below the reporting threshold. The 2016 census measured the population of the village as zero.
