= Tinjan (disambiguation) =

Tinjan refers to the municipality in Istria County, Croatia.

Tinjan may also refer to:

- Tinjan, Koper, a village in Littoral, Slovenia

== See also ==
- Tin Jan, a village in Iran
