= Kichi =

Kichi may refer to:

== Places in Iran ==
Variously spelled Kichi, Ki Chi or Keychi (Persian: كيچي):

- Keychi, Isfahan
- Kichi, Jabal, Isfahan County

== Other ==
- José María González Santos (born 1975), Spanish politician nicknamed "Kichi"
- Kichi (footballer) (born 1985), Mexican footballer
- Kichi language, Bantu language of Tanzania
- Kichi ("blessing"), a possible fortune on an o-mikuji

== See also ==
- Kiichi!!, a manga series by Hideki Arai
- Kiichi Miyazawa (1919–2007), Japanese politician
