= Kuhpayeh =

City in Isfahan province, Iran

Kuhpayeh Persian: كوهپايه
- City
- Location within Iran
- Coordinates: 32°42′50″N 52°26′11″E
- Country: Iran
- Province: Isfahan
- County: Kuhpayeh
- District: Tudeshk

Population (2016)
  - Total: 5,518
- Time zone: UTC+3:30 (IRST)

Kuhpayeh (Persian: كوهپايه) (Note: Also romanized as Koohpayeh and Kūhpāyeh; also known as Kūhpā, Kūhpāye, and Qohpayeh) is a city in Tudeshk District (Note: Formerly Kuhpayeh District of Isfahan County) of Kuhpayeh County, Isfahan province, Iran, serving as capital of the county. It was the capital of the district until its capital was transferred to the city of Tudeshk. Kuhpayeh is a historic city 70 kilometres (43 mi) east of Isfahan and where the film The Stoning of Soraya M. is depicted.

== Demographics ==
=== Language ===
The city has a distinct language/dialect of Farsi, known as "Velayati" or " Kuhpaye'i" and very similar to the Gazi language, which belongs to the northwestern Iranian languages (Indo-European -> Indo-Iranian -> Iranian -> Western -> Northwestern II -> Tatic -> Kermanic/Central Plateau -> Southwestern -> Velayati/Gazi).

=== Population ===
At the time of the 2006 National Census, the city's population was 4,417 in 1,200 households, when it was capital of Kuhpayeh District (Note: Renamed Tudeshk District of Kuhpayeh County) in Isfahan County. The following census in 2011 counted 4,587 people in 1,335 households. The 2016 census measured the population of the city as 5,518 people in 1,765 households.

In 2021, the district was separated from the county in the establishment of Kuhpayeh County and renamed Tudeshk District, with Kuhpayeh as the new county's capital.
