= Sejzi =

City in Isfahan province, Iran

Sejzi Persian: سجزي
- City
- Location within Iran
- Coordinates: 32°41′26″N 52°07′32″E
- Country: Iran
- Province: Isfahan
- County: Kuhpayeh
- District: Sistan

Population (2016)
  - Total: 5,063
- Time zone: UTC+3:30 (IRST)

Sejzi (Persian: سجزئ) (Note: Also romanized as Sajzī and Sejzī; also known as Saghzi and Sagzi (سگزئ), also romanized as Sagzī) is a city in, and the capital of, Sistan District in Kuhpayeh County, Isfahan province, Iran. It also serves as the administrative center for Sistan Rural District. It is northeast by road from Isfahan and contains an industrial area to the southwest of the city.

== Demographics ==
=== Population ===
At the time of the 2006 National Census, the city's population was 4,392 in 1,216 households, when it was in Kuhpayeh District (Note: Renamed Tudeshk District of Kuhpayeh County) of Isfahan County. The following census in 2011 counted 4,698 people in 1,473 households. The 2016 census measured the population of the city as 5,063 people in 1,618 households.

In 2021, the district was separated from the county in the establishment of Kuhpayeh County and renamed Tudeshk District. The city and the rural district were transferred to the new Sistan District.
