= Kuy-e Rowshan Shahr =

Neighborhood in Isfahan province, Iran

Kuy-e Rowshan Shahr Persian: کوي روشن شهر
- Neighborhood
- Country: Iran
- Province: Isfahan
- County: Isfahan
- District: Central
- City: Isfahan

Population (2011)
  - Total: 861
- Time zone: UTC+3:30 (IRST)

Kuy-e Rowshan Shahr (Persian: کوي روشن شهر) (Note: Also romanized as Kūy-e Rowshan Shahr) is a neighborhood in the city of Isfahan in the Central District of Isfahan County, Isfahan province, Iran.

== Demographics ==
=== Population ===
At the time of the 2006 National Census, Kuy-e Rowshan Shahr's population was 619 in 179 households, when it was a village in Jey Rural District. The following census in 2011 counted 861 people in 253 households. After the census, the village was annexed by the city of Isfahan.
