= Kuy-e Golestan =

Neighborhood in Isfahan province, Iran

Kuy-e Golestan Persian: كوي گلستان
- Neighborhood
- Country: Iran
- Province: Isfahan
- County: Isfahan
- District: Central
- City: Isfahan

Population (2011)
  - Total: 421
- Time zone: UTC+3:30 (IRST)

Kuy-e Golestan (Persian: كوي گلستان) (Note: Also romanized as Kūy-e Golestān) is a neighborhood in the city of Isfahan in the Central District of Isfahan County, Isfahan province, Iran.

== Demographics ==
=== Population ===
At the time of the 2006 National Census, Kuy-e Golestan's population was 457 in 118 households, when it was a village in Jey Rural District. The following census in 2011 counted 421 people in 126 households. After the census, the village was annexed by the city of Isfahan.
