= Sistan Rural District =

Rural district in Isfahan province, Iran

Sistan Rural District Persian: دهستان سيستان
- Rural District
- Location within Iran
- Coordinates: 32°45′N 52°07′E
- Country: Iran
- Province: Isfahan
- County: Kuhpayeh
- District: Sistan
- Established: 1987
- Capital: Sejzi

Population (2016)
  - Total: 1,076
- Time zone: UTC+3:30 (IRST)

Sistan Rural District (Persian: دهستان سيستان) is in Sistan District of Kuhpayeh County, Isfahan province, Iran. It is administered from the city of Sejzi.

== Demographics ==
=== Population ===
At the time of the 2006 National Census, the rural district's population (as a part of Kuhpayeh District (Note: Renamed Tudeshk District of Kuhpayeh County) in Isfahan County) was 1,248 in 344 households. There were 1,437 inhabitants in 432 households at the following census of 2011. The 2016 census measured the population of the rural district as 1,076 in 312 households. The most populous of its 44 villages was Vartun, with 576 people.

In 2021, the district was separated from the county in the establishment of Kuhpayeh County and renamed Tudeshk District. The rural district was transferred to the new Sistan District.

=== Other villages in the rural district ===
- Mehdiabad
- Yek Langi
