= Tudeshk Rural District =

Rural district in Isfahan province, Iran

Tudeshk Rural District Persian: دهستان تودشك
- Rural District
- Location within Iran
- Coordinates: 32°38′N 52°46′E
- Country: Iran
- Province: Isfahan
- County: Kuhpayeh
- District: Tudeshk
- Established: 1987
- Capital: Tudeshk

Population (2016)
  - Total: 3,371
- Time zone: UTC+3:30 (IRST)

Tudeshk Rural District (Persian: دهستان تودشك) is in Tudeshk District (Note: Formerly Kuhpayeh District of Isfahan County) of Kuhpayeh County, Isfahan province, Iran. It is administered from the city of Tudeshk.

== Demographics ==
=== Population ===
At the time of the 2006 National Census, the rural district's population (as a part of Kuhpayeh District (Note: Renamed Tudeshk District of Kuhpayeh County) in Isfahan County) was 3,746 in 1,148 households. There were 3,798 inhabitants in 1,059 households at the following census of 2011. The 2016 census measured the population of the rural district as 3,371 in 1,197 households. The most populous of its 87 villages was Moshkenan, with 506 people.

In 2021, the district was separated from the county in the establishment of Kuhpayeh County and renamed Tudeshk District.

=== Other villages in the rural district ===
- Abchuiyeh
- Aliabad
- Arvajeh
- Atr Afshan
- Bad Afshan
- Bidabad
- Borzabad
- Chirman-e Olya
- Chirman-e Sofla
- Darreh Shah Nazar
- Dastgerd
- Dastgerdu
- Delgosha
- Dowlatabad
- Emamzadeh Qasem
- Eshqabad
- Eyshabad
- Haft Yaran
- Hashemabad Air Force Base
- Hekmatestan
- Jeshuqan
- Jondabeh
- Key
- Khalti
- Khanabad
- Kharzanan
- Kheyrabad
- Mir Lotfollah
- Seyyedabad
- Shamsabad
- Sorkhi
- Tutchi
- Vaj
- Yazdabad
- Zederk
