= Jabal Rural District =

Rural district in Isfahan province, Iran

Jabal Rural District Persian: دهستان جبل
- Rural District
- Location within Iran
- Coordinates: 32°45′N 52°29′E
- Country: Iran
- Province: Isfahan
- County: Kuhpayeh
- District: Tudeshk
- Established: 1987
- Capital: Jezeh

Population (2016)
  - Total: 2,333
- Time zone: UTC+3:30 (IRST)

Jabal Rural District (Persian: دهستان جبل) is in Tudeshk District (Note: Formerly Kuhpayeh District of Isfahan County) of Kuhpayeh County, Isfahan province, Iran. Its capital is the village of Jezeh.

== Demographics ==
=== Population ===
At the time of the 2006 National Census, the rural district's population (as a part of Kuhpayeh District (Note: Renamed Tudeshk District of Kuhpayeh County) in Isfahan County) was 1,969 in 710 households. There were 1,720 inhabitants in 643 households at the following census of 2011. The 2016 census measured the population of the rural district as 2,333 in 840 households. The most populous of its 59 villages was Jezeh, with 835 people.

In 2021, the district was separated from the county in the establishment of Kuhpayeh County and renamed Tudeshk District.

=== Other villages in the rural district ===
- Ab Kharak
- Abbasabad
- Ali Ibrahim
- Dakhrabad
- Harizeh
- Heydarabad
- Homageran
- Kamal Beyk
- Karimabad
- Khvajeh
- Kichi
- Kordabad
- Luteri
- Mandabad
- Mir Homayun
- Mir Jafar
- Musaabad
- Olunabad
- Sahr
- Sesnabad
- Tin Jan
