= Jey Shir =

Neighborhood in Isfahan province, Iran

Jey Shir Persian: جي شير
- Neighborhood
- Location within Iran
- Coordinates: 32°37′54″N 51°44′03″E
- Country: Iran
- Province: Isfahan
- County: Isfahan
- District: Central
- City: Isfahan

Population (2011)
  - Total: 3,128
- Time zone: UTC+3:30 (IRST)

Jey Shir (Persian: جي شير) (Note: Also romanized as Jey Shīr; also known as Jey Shīd) is a neighborhood in the city of Isfahan in the Central District of Isfahan County, Isfahan province, Iran.

== Demographics ==
=== Population ===
At the time of the 2006 National Census, Jey Shir's population was 1,972 in 519 households, when it was a village in Jey Rural District. The following census in 2011 counted 3,128 people in 953 households. After the census, the village was annexed by the city of Isfahan.
