= Zefreh Rural District =

Rural district in Isfahan province, Iran

Zefreh Rural District Persian: دهستان زفره
- Rural District
- Location within Iran
- Coordinates: 32°53′N 52°15′E
- Country: Iran
- Province: Isfahan
- County: Kuhpayeh
- District: Sistan
- Established: 1987
- Capital: Zefreh

Population (2016)
  - Total: 2,040
- Time zone: UTC+3:30 (IRST)
- Website: www.zefreh.com

Zefreh Rural District (Persian: دهستان زفره) is in Sistan District of Kuhpayeh County, Isfahan province, Iran. Its capital is the village of Zefreh.

== Demographics ==
=== Population ===
At the time of the 2006 National Census, the rural district's population (as a part of Kuhpayeh District (Note: Renamed Tudeshk District of Kuhpayeh County) in Isfahan County) was 2,048 in 710 households. There were 1,806 inhabitants in 716 households at the following census of 2011. The 2016 census measured the population of the rural district as 2,040 in 746 households. The most populous of its 54 villages was Zefreh, with 1,750 people.

In 2021, the district was separated from the county in the establishment of Kuhpayeh County and renamed Tudeshk District. The rural district was transferred to the new Sistan District.

=== Other villages in the rural district ===
- Fasharak
- Randavan
