= Fenart =

Neighborhood in Isfahan province, Iran

Fenart Persian: فنارت
- Neighborhood
- Location within Iran
- Coordinates: 32°36′39″N 51°45′30″E
- Country: Iran
- Province: Isfahan
- County: Isfahan
- District: Central
- City: Isfahan

Population (2011)
  - Total: 2,194
- Time zone: UTC+3:30 (IRST)

Fenart (Persian: فنارت) (Note: Also romanized as Fenārt; also known as Penārt and Pīnārt) is a neighborhood in the city of Isfahan in the Central District of Isfahan County, Isfahan province, Iran.

== Demographics ==
=== Population ===
At the time of the 2006 National Census, Fenart's population was 2,023 in 503 households, when it was a village in Jey Rural District. The following census in 2011 counted 2,194 people in 603 households. After the census, the village was annexed by the city of Isfahan.
