= Isfahan Police Department =

Jurisdictional structure
- Operations jurisdiction: Iran

Facilities
- Stations: 18

Isfahan Police Department is a police agency in Isfahan. In 2020 Isfahan Cyber Police's new building was opened.

In 2014 Isfahan police is of Isfahan Province ranked first among the Iran's police departments.

In 2020 Chief of the provincial police is Second Brigadier General Mohammadreza Mir Heidari appointed by Hossein Ashtari.

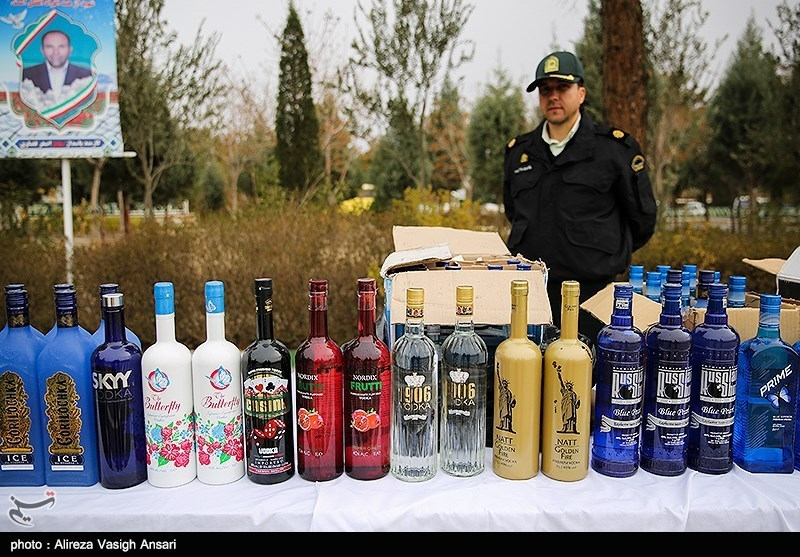
Isfahan police seized liquor 2018

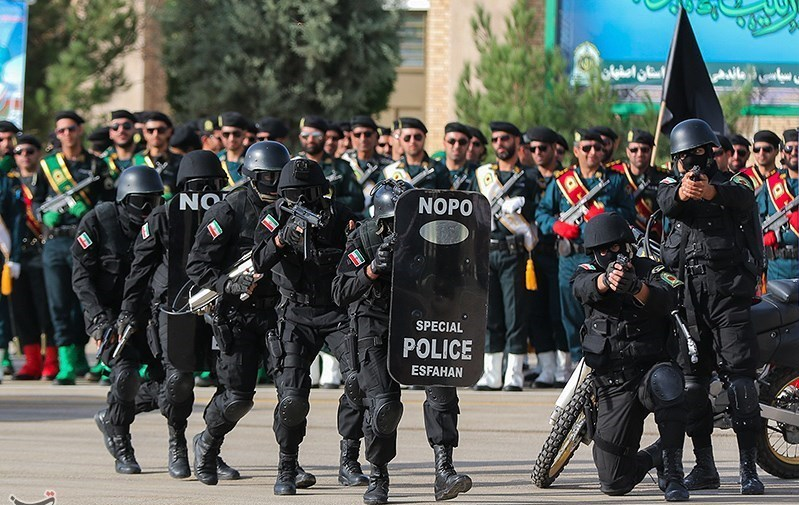
NOPO special police esfahan drill

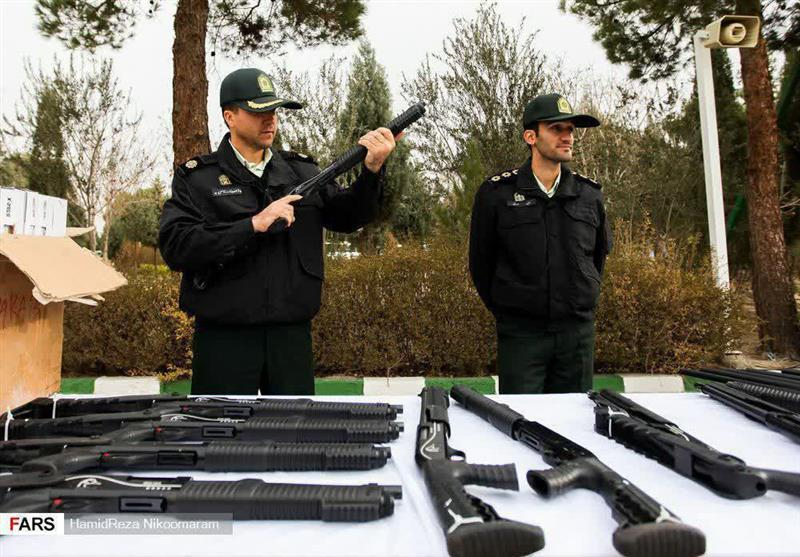
shotguns confiscated by isfahan police

== Administration ==
=== List of police stations ===
List of Police stations in Isfahan
| District | Number | Name | Address |
|---|---|---|---|
| 3 | 11 | Seid alikhan | Ostandari Street |
| 8 | 12 | Meidan jomhoori | Jomhoori Eslami Square |
| 3 | 13 | Vali Asr | Ghiam Square |
| 4 | 14 | Bozorgmehr | Bozorgmehr Street |
| 5 | 15 | Roodaki | Roodaki Street |
| 6 | 16 | Feiz | Feiz street |
| 10 | 17 | Haftoon | Parvin street |
| 9 | 18 | Mirza Taher | Kharazi highway |
| 7 | 19 | Kaveh | Kaveh highway |
| 12 | 20 | Malek Shahr | Mofateh street |
| 5 | 21 | Sepahan shahr | Beesat avenue |
| 15 | 23 | Khorasgan | Khorasgan |
| 12 | 24 | Amirkabir | Imam Khomeini street |
| 11 | 25 | Rehnan | Rehnan Shohada |
| 14 | 26 | Zeinabie | Ashegh Isfahani Square |
| 8 | 27 | Khane Esfahan | Khane Esfahan |
| 13 | 28 | Amirhamze | Shahrak amirhamze |
| 6 | 34 | Dadgostari | Nikbakht avenue |

== See also ==
- Judicial system of Iran
