= Jey Rural District =

Rural district in Isfahan province, Iran

Jey Rural District Persian: دهستان جي
- Rural District
- Location within Iran
- Coordinates: 32°34′N 51°47′E
- Country: Iran
- Province: Isfahan
- County: Isfahan
- District: Central
- Established: 1987

Population (2016)
  - Total: 3,619
- Time zone: UTC+3:30 (IRST)

Jey Rural District (Persian: دهستان جي) is in the Central District of Isfahan County, Isfahan province, Iran. (Note: The capital of the rural district was listed as the village of Arghavaniyeh (ارغوانیه), also known as Aqrabani (آقاربانی))

== Demographics ==
=== Population ===
At the time of the 2006 National Census, the village's population was 17,543 in 4,696 households. There were 19,210 inhabitants in 5,686 households at the following census of 2011. The 2016 census measured the population of the village as 3,619 in 1,110 households. The most populous of its 13 villages was Seresh Badaran, with 2,459 people.

=== Other villages in the rural district ===
- Molana Safi
- Qaleh Sarab
- Zardanjan

=== Former villages now neighborhoods in the city of Isfahan ===
- Atasharan
- Fenart
- Histan
- Jey Shir
- Jowharan
- Kalamkharan
- Kuy-e Golestan
- Kuy-e Rowshan Shahr
- Qaleh-ye Bertianchi
- Raran
- Rowshan Dasht
- Salimi
- Sanjavan Marreh
- Shahrak-e Zayandeh Rud
- Zavan
