= East Park of Isfahan =

Coordinates: 32°38′7″N 51°48′50″E

Nakhodi mountain
- Interactive map of Nakhodi mountain
- Nearest city: Isfahan
- Owned by: Isfahan Parks and Green Space Organization
- Administered by: East park administrator Districts 4, 15 municipality

East Park of Isfahan or Eshragh Park is a regional park in the area of Nakhodi Mountain located in the eastern part of Isfahan. It has various natural attractions and is a government tourism project under construction. The project is in District 4 under Isfahan Municipality domain, phase 1 of the project is 30 thousand meters square, built at a cost of 2500 million dollars. The 1st phase includes parking, green spaces, bicycle track, rest rooms. The 2nd phase includes pavements, amphitheater, and parks that are now under digging stage. The 3rd phase also has Dolphin Park, zip-line, and some other exciting recreations. This mountain park provides vital 40% of city clean air with a combined 1400 hectares of green space.
