= Shahrak-e Zayandeh Rud =

Neighborhood in Isfahan province, Iran

Shahrak-e Zayandeh Rud Persian: شهرک زاينده رود
- Neighborhood
- Location within Iran
- Coordinates: 32°36′36″N 51°46′06″E
- Country: Iran
- Province: Isfahan
- County: Isfahan
- District: Central
- City: Isfahan

Population (2011)
  - Total: 1,153
- Time zone: UTC+3:30 (IRST)

Shahrak-e Zayandeh Rud (Persian: شهرک زاينده رود) (Note: Also romanized as Shahrak-e Zāyandeh Rūd; also known as Fenārat) is a neighborhood in the city of Isfahan in the Central District of Isfahan County, Isfahan province, Iran.

== Demographics ==
=== Population ===
At the time of the 2006 National Census, Shahrak-e Zayandeh Rud's population was 957 in 261 households, when it was a village in Jey Rural District. The following census in 2011 counted 1,153 people in 337 households. After the census, the village was annexed by the city of Isfahan.
