= Tudeshk =

City in Isfahan province, Iran

Tudeshk Persian: تودشك
- City
- Location within Iran
- Coordinates: 32°43′13″N 52°40′15″E
- Country: Iran
- Province: Isfahan
- County: Kuhpayeh
- District: Tudeshk
- Established as a city: 2001

Population (2016)
  - Total: 4,275
- Time zone: UTC+3:30 (IRST)

Tudeshk (Persian: تودشك) (Note: Also romanized as Toodeshk, Tudashk, and Tūdeshk; also known as Tūdasht and Tūdeshg) is a city in, and the capital of, Tudeshk District (Note: Formerly Kuhpayeh District of Isfahan County) in Kuhpayeh County, Isfahan province, Iran. It also serves as the administrative center for Tudeshk Rural District. The village of Tudeshk, after merging with the villages of Mazraeh-ye Kohneh Varjan (مزرعه کهنه ورجان), Mazraeh-ye Now (مزرعه نو), Nowbonyad (نوبنیاد), Sadeqabad (صادق آباد), and Tudeshjuiyeh (تودشکجوئیه), was converted to a city in 2001.

== Demographics ==
=== Population ===
At the time of the 2006 National Census, the city's population was 3,940 in 1,100 households, when it was in Kuhpayeh District (Note: Renamed Tudeshk District of Kuhpayeh County) of Isfahan County. The following census in 2011 counted 4,229 people in 1,331 households. The 2016 census measured the population of the city as 4,275 people in 1,380 households.

In 2021, the district was separated from the county in the establishment of Kuhpayeh County and renamed Tudeshk District.
