= Sistan District =

District in Isfahan province, Iran

Sistan District Persian: بخش سیستان
- District
- Location within Iran
- Coordinates: 32°48′N 52°08′E
- Country: Iran
- Province: Isfahan
- County: Kuhpayeh
- Established: 2021
- Capital: Sejzi
- Time zone: UTC+3:30 (IRST)

Sistan District (Persian: بخش سیستان) is in Kuhpayeh County, Isfahan province, Iran. Its capital is the city of Sejzi, whose population at the time of the 2016 National Census was 5,063 people in 1,618 households.

== History ==
In 2021, Kuhpayeh District (Note: Renamed Tudeshk District of Kuhpayeh County) was separated from Isfahan County in the establishment of Kuhpayeh County and renamed Tudeshk District. The new county was divided into two districts of two rural districts each, with the city of Kuhpayeh as its capital.

== Demographics ==
=== Administrative divisions ===
Sistan District
Administrative Divisions
Sistan RD
Zefreh RD
Sejzi (city)
RD = Rural District
