= Kuhpayeh County =

County in Isfahan province, Iran

Kuhpayeh County Persian: شهرستان کوهپایه
- County
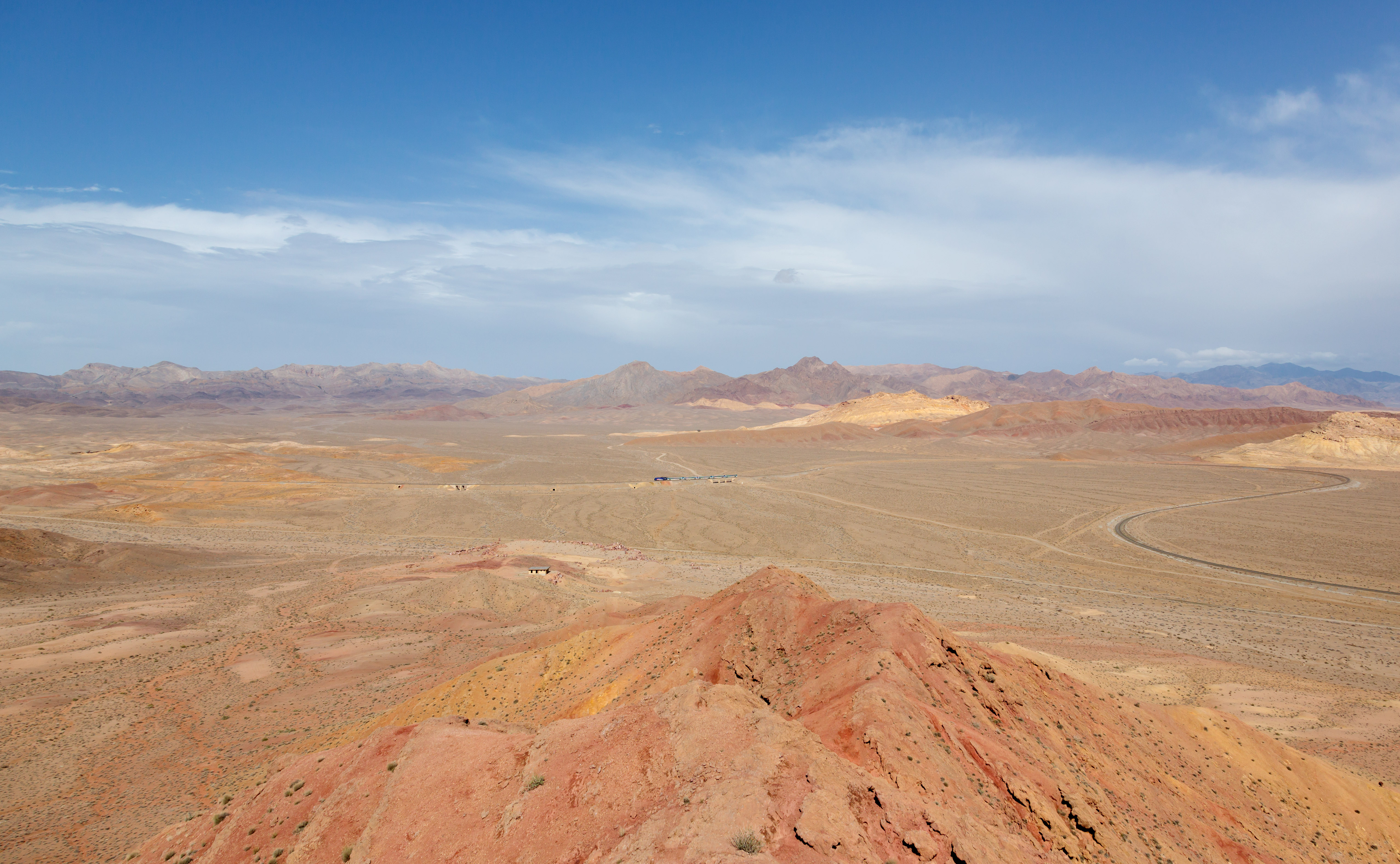
- Landscape north of the city of Sejzi

- Location of Kuhpayeh County in Isfahan province (center right, purple)

- Location of Isfahan province in Iran
- Coordinates: 32°40′N 52°29′E
- Country: Iran
- Province: Isfahan
- Established: 2021
- Capital: Kuhpayeh
- Districts: Sistan, Tudeshk
- Time zone: UTC+3:30 (IRST)

Kuhpayeh County (Persian: شهرستان کوهپایه) is in Isfahan province, Iran. Its capital is the city of Kuhpayeh, whose population at the time of the 2016 National Census was 5,518 people in 1,765 households.

== History ==
In 2021, Kuhpayeh District (Note: Renamed Tudeshk District of Kuhpayeh County) was separated from Isfahan County in the establishment of Kuhpayeh County and renamed Tudeshk District. The new county was divided into two districts of two rural districts each, with Kuhpayeh as its capital.

== Demographics ==
=== Administrative divisions ===
Kuhpayeh County's administrative structure is shown in the following table.

Kuhpayeh County
Administrative Divisions
Sistan District
Sistan RD
Zefreh RD
Sejzi (city)
Tudeshk District (Note: Formerly Kuhpayeh District of Isfahan County)
Jabal RD
Tudeshk RD
Kuhpayeh (city)
Tudeshk (city)
RD = Rural District

== See also ==
Media related to Kuhpayeh County at Wikimedia Commons
