= Tudeshk District =

District in Isfahan province, Iran

Tudeshk District Persian: بخش تودشک
- District
- Location within Iran
- Coordinates: 32°40′N 52°41′E
- Country: Iran
- Province: Isfahan
- County: Kuhpayeh
- Capital: Tudeshk

Population (2016)
  - Total: 23,676 (Note: As Kuhpayeh District of Isfahan County)
- Time zone: UTC+3:30 (IRST)

Tudeshk District (Persian: بخش تودشک) (Note: Formerly Kuhpayeh District (بخش کوهپایه) of Isfahan County) is in Kuhpayeh County, Isfahan province, Iran. Its capital is the city of Tudeshk. The previous capital of the district was the city of Kuhpayeh.

== History ==
In 2021, Kuhpayeh District (Note: Renamed Tudeshk District of Kuhpayeh County) was separated from Isfahan County in the establishment of Kuhpayeh County and renamed Tudeshk District. The new county was divided into two districts of two rural districts each, with the city of Kuhpayeh as its capital.

=== Population ===
At the time of the 2006 National Census, the district's population (as Kuhpayeh District of Isfahan County) was 21,760 in 6,428 households. The following census in 2011 counted 22,275 people in 6,989 households. The 2016 census measured the population of the district as 23,676 inhabitants in 7,858 households.

== Demographics ==
=== Administrative divisions ===
Tudeshk District (Note: As Kuhpayeh District of Isfahan County at the 2006, 2011, and 2016 censuses)
Administrative Divisions	2006	2011	2016
Jabal RD	1,969	1,720	2,333
Sistan RD (Note: Transferred to Sistan District)	1,248	1,437	1,076
Tudeshk RD	3,746	3,798	3,371
Zefreh RD	2,048	1,806	2,040
Kuhpayeh (city)	4,417	4,587	5,518
Sejzi (city)	4,392	4,698	5,063
Tudeshk (city)	3,940	4,229	4,275
Total	21,760	22,275	23,676
RD = Rural District
