= Isfahan County =

County in Isfahan province, Iran

Isfahan County Persian: شهرستان اصفهان
- County
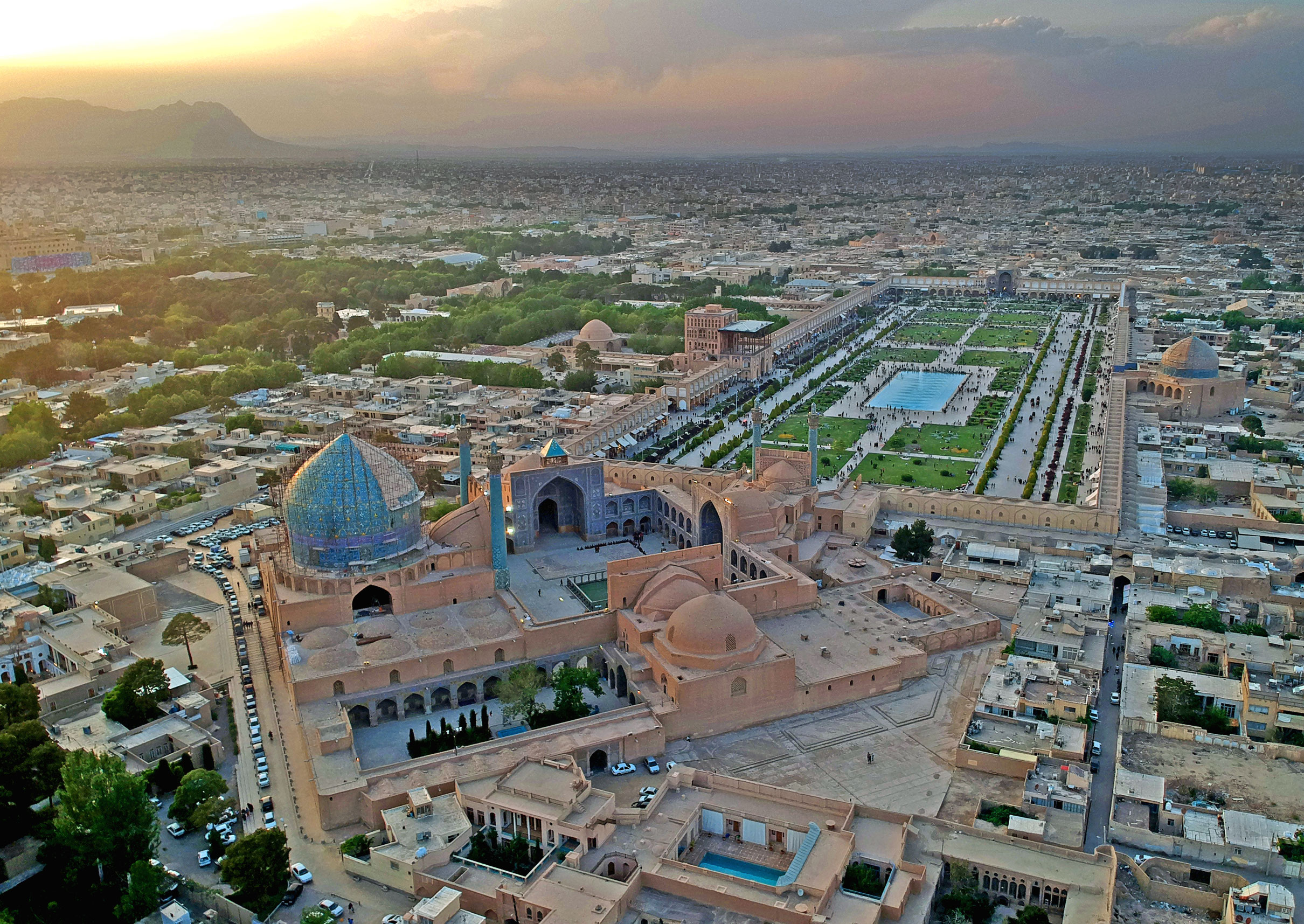
- Aerial view of the city of Isfahan and Naqsh-e Jahan Square

- Location of Isfahan County in Isfahan province (center, green)

- Location of Isfahan province in Iran
- Coordinates: 32°34′N 51°47′E
- Country: Iran
- Province: Isfahan
- Capital: Isfahan
- Districts: Central

Population (2016)
  - Total: 2,243,249
- Time zone: UTC+3:30 (IRST)

Isfahan County (Persian: شهرستان اصفهان) is in Isfahan province, Iran. Its capital is the city of Isfahan.

== History ==
The village of Qahjavarestan was converted to a city in 2007, and likewise the village of Ziar in 2012. The city of Isfahan annexed the city of Khvorasgan in 2015.

In 2021, five districts were separated from Isfahan County in the establishment of four new counties: Bon Rud District (Note: Renamed the Central District of Varzaneh County) was renamed the Central District of Varzaneh County; Jarqavieh Olya and Jarqavieh Sofla (Note: Renamed the Central District of Jarqavieh County) Districts formed Jarqavieh County; Jolgeh District (Note: Renamed the Central District of Harand County) was renamed the Central District of Harand County; and Kuhpayeh District (Note: Renamed Tudeshk District in Kuhpayeh County) was renamed Tudeshk District in establishing Kuhpayeh County.

== Demographics ==
=== Population ===
At the time of the 2006 census, the county's population was 1,963,315 in 543,688 households. The following census in 2011 counted 2,174,172 people in 657,857 households. The 2016 census measured the population of the county as 2,243,249 in 707,870 households.

=== Administrative divisions ===
Isfahan County's population history and administrative structure over three consecutive censuses are shown in the following table.

Isfahan County Population
Administrative Divisions	2006	2011	2016
Central District	1,860,674	2,067,821	2,130,970
Baraan-e Jonubi RD	15,210	15,439	12,529
Baraan-e Shomali RD	19,521	19,335	17,726
Jey RD	17,543	19,210	3,619
Keraraj RD	29,032	33,809	25,287
Mahmudabad RD	15,205	15,176	0
Qahab-e Jonubi RD	15,169	13,385	4,541
Qahab-e Shomali RD	33,784	28,621	13,355
Baharestan (city)	45,538	61,647	79,023
Isfahan (city)	1,583,609	1,756,126	1,961,260
Khvorasgan (city) (Note: Annexed by the city of Isfahan)	86,063	97,167	
Qahjavarestan (city)		7,906	9,712
Ziar (city)			3,918
Bon Rud District (Note: Transferred to Varzaneh County and renamed the Central District after the 2016 census)	26,285	27,687	29,718
Gavkhuni RD (Note: Renamed Gavkhuni-ye Shomali Rural District)	6,833	7,208	7,930
Rudasht-e Sharqi RD	7,946	8,555	9,074
Varzaneh (city)	11,506	11,924	12,714
Jarqavieh Olya District (Note: Transferred to Jarqavieh County after the 2016 census)	14,099	13,839	14,716
Jarqavieh Olya RD	5,026	4,982	5,296
Ramsheh RD	4,731	4,590	4,942
Hasanabad (city)	4,342	4,267	4,478
Jarqavieh Sofla District (Note: Transferred to Jarqavieh County after the 2016 census and renamed the Central District)	20,970	22,003	22,891
Jarqavieh Sofla RD	460	523	593
Jarqavieh Vosta RD	6,204	6,452	6,477
Mohammadabad (city)	4,391	4,549	5,032
Nasrabad (city)	5,751	6,176	6,425
Nikabad (city)	4,164	4,303	4,364
Jolgeh District (Note: Transferred to Harand County after the 2016 census and renamed the Central District)	19,527	20,547	21,257
Emamzadeh Abdol Aziz RD	9,019	9,377	9,712
Rudasht RD	586	581	560
Ezhiyeh (city)	3,309	3,481	3,156
Harand (city)	6,613	7,108	7,829
Kuhpayeh District (Note: Transferred to Kuhpayeh County after the 2016 census and renamed Tudeshk District)	21,760	22,275	23,676
Jabal RD	1,969	1,720	2,333
Sistan RD	1,248	1,437	1,076
Tudeshk RD	3,746	3,798	3,371
Zefreh RD	2,048	1,806	2,040
Kuhpayeh (city)	4,417	4,587	5,518
Sejzi (city)	4,392	4,698	5,063
Tudeshk (city)	3,940	4,229	4,275
Total	1,963,315	2,174,172	2,243,249
RD = Rural District

== See also ==
- List of historical structures in Isfahan province

Media related to Isfahan County at Wikimedia Commons
