= Sharifabad =

Sharifabad (Persian: شريف اباد) may refer to:

== Armenia ==
- Sharifabad, former name of Araks, Echmiadzin, a town in Armenia

== India ==
- Sharifabad, a village in Nalanda district in Bihar
- Sharifabad (alternately spelt as “Shariefabad”), a village in the outskirts of Srinagar city, Jammu and Kashmir

== Iran ==
- Sharifabad Rural District (disambiguation), administrative subdivisions of Iran

=== Chaharmahal and Bakhtiari Province ===
- Sharifabad, Chaharmahal and Bakhtiari, a village in Farsan County

=== Hamadan Province ===
- Sharifabad-e Quzan, a village in Malayer County
- Sharifabad-e Tajar, a village in Malayer County
- Sharifabad, Hamadan, a village in Nahavand County

=== Isfahan Province ===
- Sharifabad, Bon Rud, a village in Isfahan County
- Sharifabad, Jolgeh, a village in Isfahan County

=== Kerman Province ===
- Sharifabad, Anar, a village in Anar County
- Sharifabad, Anbarabad, a village in Anbarabad County
- Sharifabad, Rafsanjan, a village in Rafsanjan County
- Sharifabad, Sirjan, a village in Sirjan County
- Sharifabad, Pariz, a village in Sirjan County
- Sharifabad, Zarand, a village in Zarand County
- Sharifabad Rural District (Rafsanjan County)
- Sharifabad Rural District (Sirjan County)

=== Kermanshah Province ===
- Sharifabad, Sahneh, a village in Sahneh County
- Sharifabad, Dinavar, a village in Sahneh County
- Sharifabad, Sonqor, a village in Sonqor County

=== Khuzestan Province ===
- Sharifabad, Andika, a village in Andika County
- Sharifabad, Karun, a village in Karun County

=== Kurdistan Province ===
- Sharifabad, Bijar, a village in Bijar County
- Sharifabad, Chang Almas, a village in Bijar County
- Sharifabad, Divandarreh, a village in Divandarreh County
- Sharifabad, Saqqez, a village in Saqqez County

=== Lorestan Province ===
- Sharifabad, Lorestan, a village in Lorestan Province, Iran

=== Mazandaran Province ===
- Sharifabad, Sari, a village in Sari County
- Sharifabad, Tonekabon, a neighborhood of Shirud city in Tonekabon County

=== Qazvin Province ===
- Sharifabad, Alborz, a village in Qazvin Province, Iran
- Sharifabad, Qazvin, a village in Qazvin Province, Iran
- Sharifabad Rural District (Qazvin Province) an administrative subdivision of Qazvin Province, Iran

=== Qom Province ===
- Sharifabad, Qom, a village in Qom Province, Iran
- Sharifabad-e Gavkhuni, a village in Qom Province, Iran
- Sharifabad-e Zand, a village in Qom Province, Iran

=== Razavi Khorasan Province ===
- Sharifabad, Bardaskan, a village in Bardaskan County
- Sharifabad-e Utan, a village in Chenaran County
- Sharifabad, Joghatai, a village in Joghatai County
- Sharifabad, Mashhad, a village in Mashhad County

=== Semnan Province ===
- Sharifabad, Meyami, a village in Meyami County
- Sharifabad, Shahrud, a village in Shahrud County

=== Sistan and Baluchestan Province ===
- Sharifabad, Iranshahr, a village in Iranshahr County
- Sharifabad-e Chah Kan, a village in Khash County

=== South Khorasan Province ===
- Sharifabad, South Khorasan, a village in Birjand County

=== Tehran Province ===
- Sharifabad, Iran, a city in Tehran Province, Iran
- Sharifabad, Malard, a village in Malard County, Tehran Province, Iran
- Sharifabad, Rey, a village in Rey County, Tehran Province, Iran
- Sharifabad District, an administrative division of Tehran Province, Iran
- Sharifabad Rural District (Pakdasht County), an administrative division of Tehran Province, Iran

=== West Azerbaijan Province ===
- Sharifabad, Khoy, a village in Khoy County
- Sharifabad, Showt, a village in Showt County
- Sharifabad, Urmia, a village in Urmia County

=== Yazd Province ===
- Sharifabad, Saduq, a village in Saduq County
- Sharifabad, Aliabad, a village in Taft County
- Sharifabad (31°24′ N 53°52′ E), Dehshir, a village in Taft County
- Sharifabad (31°28′ N 53°47′ E), Dehshir, a village in Taft County
- Sharifabad, Ardakan, a village in Ardakan County

=== Zanjan Province ===
- Sharifabad, Zanjan, a neighborhood in Abhar city

== Pakistan ==
- Sharifabad (Karachi), a neighbourhood of Karachi, Pakistan

== See also ==
- Sharafabad (disambiguation)
