= Kebrit =

Village in Isfahan province, Iran

Kebrit Persian: كبريت
- Village
- Location within Iran
- Coordinates: 32°30′17″N 52°34′34″E
- Country: Iran
- Province: Isfahan
- County: Harand
- District: Central
- Rural District: Hashemabad

Population (2016)
  - Total: 467
- Time zone: UTC+3:30 (IRST)

Kebrit (Persian: كبريت) (Note: Also romanized as Kebrīt; also known as Kerbīt) is a village in Hashemabad Rural District of the Central District (Note: Formerly Jolgeh District in Isfahan County) in Harand County, Isfahan province, Iran.

== Demographics ==
=== Population ===
At the time of the 2006 National Census, the village's population was 349 in 92 households, when it was in Gavkhuni Rural District (Note: Renamed Gavkhuni-ye Shomali Rural District) of Bon Rud District (Note: Renamed the Central District of Varzaneh County) in Isfahan County. The following census in 2011 counted 349 people in 108 households. The 2016 census measured the population of the village as 467 people in 144 households.

In 2021, the district was separated from the county in the establishment of Varzaneh County and renamed the Central District. Kebrit was separated from the rural district in the establishment of Harand County and transferred to Hashemabad Rural District created in the new Central District.
