= Baqerabad, Harand =

Village in Isfahan province, Iran

Baqerabad Persian: باقراباد
- Village
- Location within Iran
- Coordinates: 32°29′36″N 52°34′04″E
- Country: Iran
- Province: Isfahan
- County: Harand
- District: Central
- Rural District: Hashemabad

Population (2016)
  - Total: 495
- Time zone: UTC+3:30 (IRST)

Baqerabad (Persian: باقراباد) (Note: Also romanized as Bāqerābād; also known as Bagher Abad and Baqirābād) is a village in Hashemabad Rural District of the Central District (Note: Formerly Jolgeh District in Isfahan County) in Harand County, Isfahan province, Iran.

== Demographics ==
=== Population ===
At the time of the 2006 National Census, the village's population was 1,029 in 274 households, when it was in Gavkhuni Rural District (Note: Renamed Gavkhuni-ye Shomali Rural District) of Bon Rud District (Note: Renamed the Central District of Varzaneh County) in Isfahan County. The following census in 2011 counted 1,081 people in 313 households. The 2016 census measured the population of the village as 1,197 people in 358 households.

In 2021, the district was separated from the county in the establishment of Varzaneh County and renamed the Central District. Baqerabad was separated from the rural district in the establishment of Harand County and transferred to Hashemabad Rural District created in the new Central District.
