= Pajikabad =

Village in Isfahan province, Iran

Pajikabad Persian: پاجيك اباد
- Village
- Location within Iran
- Coordinates: 32°31′31″N 52°12′44″E
- Country: Iran
- Province: Isfahan
- County: Harand
- District: Ezhiyeh
- Rural District: Kelishad

Population (2016)
  - Total: 169
- Time zone: UTC+3:30 (IRST)

Pajikabad (Persian: پاجيك اباد) (Note: Also romanized as Pājīkābād; also known as Bājīkābād) is a village in Kelishad Rural District of Ezhiyeh District in Harand County, Isfahan province, Iran.

== Demographics ==
=== Population ===
At the time of the 2006 National Census, the village's population was 155 in 41 households, when it was in Emamzadeh Abdol Aziz Rural District of Jolgeh District (Note: Renamed the Central District of Harand County) in Isfahan County. The following census in 2011 counted 164 people in 46 households. The 2016 census measured the population of the village as 169 people in 50 households.

In 2021, the district was separated from the county in the establishment of Harand County and renamed the Central District. Pajikabad was transferred to Kelishad Rural District created in the new Ezhiyeh District.
