= Kelishad, Harand =

Village in Isfahan province, Iran

Kelishad Persian: كليشاد
- Village
- Location within Iran
- Coordinates: 32°30′03″N 52°08′24″E
- Country: Iran
- Province: Isfahan
- County: Harand
- District: Ezhiyeh
- Rural District: Kelishad

Population (2016)
  - Total: 343
- Time zone: UTC+3:30 (IRST)

Kelishad (Persian: كليشاد) (Note: Also romanized as Kelīshād) is a village in, and the capital of, Kelishad Rural District in Ezhiyeh District of Harand County, Isfahan province, Iran.

== Demographics ==
=== Population ===
At the time of the 2006 National Census, the village's population was 322 in 86 households, when it was in Emamzadeh Abdol Aziz Rural District of Jolgeh District (Note: Renamed the Central District of Harand County) in Isfahan County. The following census in 2011 counted 300 people in 97 households. The 2016 census measured the population of the village as 343 people in 109 households.

In 2021, the district was separated from the county in the establishment of Harand County and renamed the Central District. Kelishad was transferred to Kelishad Rural District created in the new Ezhiyeh District.
