= Tahmuresat =

Village in Isfahan province, Iran

Tahmuresat Persian: طهمورثات
- Village
- Location within Iran
- Coordinates: 32°24′19″N 52°26′59″E
- Country: Iran
- Province: Isfahan
- County: Varzaneh
- District: Rudasht
- Rural District: Kafrud

Population (2016)
  - Total: 296
- Time zone: UTC+3:30 (IRST)

Tahmuresat (Persian: طهمورثات) (Note: Also romanized as Ţahmūresāt and Ţahmūrsāt; also known as Tahmūsārd) is a village in Kafrud Rural District of Rudasht District in Varzaneh County, Isfahan province, Iran.

== Demographics ==
=== Population ===
At the time of the 2006 National Census, the village's population was 312 in 90 households, when it was in Rudasht-e Sharqi Rural District of Bon Rud District (Note: Renamed the Central District of Varzaneh County) in Isfahan County. The following census in 2011 counted 315 people in 94 households. The 2016 census measured the population of the village as 296 people in 99 households.

In 2021, the district was separated from the county in the establishment of Varzaneh County and renamed the Central District. The rural district was transferred to the new Rudasht District, and Tahmuresat was transferred to Kafrud Rural District created in the same district.
