= Sereyan =

Village in Isfahan province, Iran

Sereyan Persian: سريان
- Village
- Location within Iran
- Coordinates: 32°33′00″N 52°10′33″E
- Country: Iran
- Province: Isfahan
- County: Harand
- District: Ezhiyeh
- Rural District: Kelishad

Population (2016)
  - Total: 244
- Time zone: UTC+3:30 (IRST)

Sereyan (Persian: سريان) (Note: Also romanized as Saryān, Sereyān, and Seryān; also known as Sīdān, Sīreyān, Sīrian, and Sīrīān) is a village in Kelishad Rural District of Ezhiyeh District in Harand County, Isfahan province, Iran.

== Demographics ==
=== Population ===
At the time of the 2006 National Census, the village's population was 214 in 63 households, when it was in Emamzadeh Abdol Aziz Rural District of Jolgeh District (Note: Renamed the Central District of Harand County) in Isfahan County. The following census in 2011 counted 235 people in 73 households. The 2016 census measured the population of the village as 244 people in 79 households.

In 2021, the district was separated from the county in the establishment of Harand County and renamed the Central District. Sereyan was transferred to Kelishad Rural District created in the new Ezhiyeh District.
