= Khorram, Isfahan =

Village in Isfahan province, Iran

Khorram Persian: خرم
- Village
- Location within Iran
- Coordinates: 32°28′45″N 52°11′14″E
- Country: Iran
- Province: Isfahan
- County: Harand
- District: Ezhiyeh
- Rural District: Kelishad

Population (2016)
  - Total: 295
- Time zone: UTC+3:30 (IRST)

Khorram (Persian: خرم) (Note: Also known as Khorramābād) is a village in Kelishad Rural District of Ezhiyeh District in Harand County, Isfahan province, Iran.

== Demographics ==
=== Population ===
At the time of the 2006 National Census, the village's population was 264 in 77 households, when it was in Emamzadeh Abdol Aziz Rural District of Jolgeh District (Note: Renamed the Central District of Harand County) in Isfahan County. The following census in 2011 counted 289 people in 92 households. The 2016 census measured the population of the village as 295 people in 98 households.

In 2021, the district was separated from the county in the establishment of Harand County and renamed the Central District. Khorram was transferred to Kelishad Rural District created in the new Ezhiyeh District.
