= Marchi, Iran =

Village in Isfahan province, Iran

Marchi Persian: مارچي
- Village
- Location within Iran
- Coordinates: 32°31′46″N 52°07′41″E
- Country: Iran
- Province: Isfahan
- County: Harand
- District: Ezhiyeh
- Rural District: Kelishad

Population (2016)
  - Total: 134
- Time zone: UTC+3:30 (IRST)

Marchi (Persian: مارچي) (Note: Also romanized as Mārchī) is a village in Kelishad Rural District of Ezhiyeh District in Harand County, Isfahan province, Iran.

== Demographics ==
=== Population ===
At the time of the 2006 National Census, the village's population was 119 in 25 households, when it was in Emamzadeh Abdol Aziz Rural District of Jolgeh District (Note: Renamed the Central District of Harand County) in Isfahan County. The following census in 2011 counted 110 people in 28 households. The 2016 census measured the population of the village as 134 people in 38 households.

In 2021, the district was separated from the county in the establishment of Harand County and renamed the Central District. Marchi was transferred to Kelishad Rural District created in the new Ezhiyeh District.
