= Qaleh Abdollah, Isfahan =

Village in Isfahan province, Iran

Qaleh Abdollah Persian: قلعه عبداله
- Village
- Location within Iran
- Coordinates: 32°33′31″N 52°07′18″E
- Country: Iran
- Province: Isfahan
- County: Harand
- District: Ezhiyeh
- Rural District: Kelishad

Population (2016)
  - Total: 192
- Time zone: UTC+3:30 (IRST)

Qaleh Abdollah (Persian: قلعه عبداله) (Note: Also romanized as Qal‘eh ‘Abdollāh and Qal‘eh-ye ‘Abdollāh; also known as Qal‘eh Abdullah) is a village in Kelishad Rural District of Ezhiyeh District in Harand County, Isfahan province, Iran.

== Demographics ==
=== Population ===
At the time of the 2006 National Census, the village's population was 188 in 47 households, when it was in Emamzadeh Abdol Aziz Rural District of Jolgeh District (Note: Renamed the Central District of Harand County) in Isfahan County. The following census in 2011 counted 203 people in 60 households. The 2016 census measured the population of the village as 192 people in 60 households.

In 2021, the district was separated from the county in the establishment of Harand County and renamed the Central District. Qaleh Abdollah was transferred to Kelishad Rural District created in the new Ezhiyeh District.
