= Sokkan, Harand =

Village in Isfahan province, Iran

Sokkan Persian: سكان
- Village
- Location within Iran
- Coordinates: 32°30′04″N 52°13′11″E
- Country: Iran
- Province: Isfahan
- County: Harand
- District: Ezhiyeh
- Rural District: Kelishad

Population (2016)
  - Total: 108
- Time zone: UTC+3:30 (IRST)

Sokkan (Persian: سكان) (Note: Also romanized as Sekān, Sokān, and Sokkān; also known as Sokkūn and Sokūn) is a village in Kelishad Rural District of Ezhiyeh District in Harand County, Isfahan province, Iran.

== Demographics ==
=== Population ===
At the time of the 2006 National Census, the village's population was 132 in 34 households, when it was in Emamzadeh Abdol Aziz Rural District of Jolgeh District (Note: Renamed the Central District of Harand County) in Isfahan County. The following census in 2011 counted 123 people in 34 households. The 2016 census measured the population of the village as 108 people in 35 households.

In 2021, the district was separated from the county in the establishment of Harand County and renamed the Central District. Sokkan was transferred to Kelishad Rural District created in the new Ezhiyeh District.
