= Kamandan, Isfahan =

Village in Isfahan province, Iran

Kamandan Persian: كمندان
- Village
- Location within Iran
- Coordinates: 32°32′20″N 52°12′52″E
- Country: Iran
- Province: Isfahan
- County: Harand
- District: Ezhiyeh
- Rural District: Kelishad

Population (2016)
  - Total: 406
- Time zone: UTC+3:30 (IRST)

Kamandan (Persian: كمندان) (Note: Also romanized as Kamandān) is a village in Kelishad Rural District of Ezhiyeh District in Harand County, Isfahan province, Iran.

== Demographics ==
=== Population ===
At the time of the 2006 National Census, the village's population was 368 in 88 households, when it was in Emamzadeh Abdol Aziz Rural District of Jolgeh District (Note: Renamed the Central District of Harand County) in Isfahan County. The following census in 2011 counted 362 people in 106 households. The 2016 census measured the population of the village as 406 people in 128 households.

In 2021, the district was separated from the county in the establishment of Harand County and renamed the Central District. Kamandan was transferred to Kelishad Rural District created in the new Ezhiyeh District.
