= Jondan =

Village in Isfahan province, Iran

Jondan Persian: جندان
- Village
- Location within Iran
- Coordinates: 32°24′30″N 52°30′59″E
- Country: Iran
- Province: Isfahan
- County: Varzaneh
- District: Rudasht
- Rural District: Kafrud

Population (2016)
  - Total: 1,998
- Time zone: UTC+3:30 (IRST)

Jondan (Persian: جندان) (Note: Also romanized as Jondān; also known as Jow Dān and Jūdān) is a village in, and the capital of, Kafrud Rural District in Rudasht District of Varzaneh County, Isfahan province, Iran.

== Demographics ==
=== Population ===
At the time of the 2006 National Census, the village's population was 1,790 in 516 households, when it was in Rudasht-e Sharqi Rural District of Bon Rud District (Note: Renamed the Central District of Varzaneh County) in Isfahan County. The following census in 2011 counted 1,979 people in 619 households. The 2016 census measured the population of the village as 1,998 people in 651 households.

In 2021, the district was separated from the county in the establishment of Varzaneh County and renamed the Central District. The rural district was transferred to the new Rudasht District, and Jondan was transferred to Kafrud Rural District created in the same district.
