= Khvorchan =

Village in Isfahan province, Iran

Khvorchan Persian: خورچان
- Village
- Location within Iran
- Coordinates: 32°28′24″N 52°11′37″E
- Country: Iran
- Province: Isfahan
- County: Harand
- District: Ezhiyeh
- Rural District: Kelishad

Population (2016)
  - Total: 482
- Time zone: UTC+3:30 (IRST)

Khvorchan (Persian: خورچان) (Note: Also romanized as Khowrchān, Khūrchān, and Khvorchān; also known as Kharchūn, Khorchūn, and Khorechūn) is a village in Kelishad Rural District of Ezhiyeh District in Harand County, Isfahan province, Iran.

== Demographics ==
=== Population ===
At the time of the 2006 National Census, the village's population was 452 in 133 households, when it was in Emamzadeh Abdol Aziz Rural District of Jolgeh District (Note: Renamed the Central District of Harand County) in Isfahan County. The following census in 2011 counted 431 people in 147 households. The 2016 census measured the population of the village as 482 people in 163 households.

In 2021, the district was separated from the county in the establishment of Harand County and renamed the Central District. Khvorchan was transferred to Kelishad Rural District created in the new Ezhiyeh District.
