= Qaleh Sareban =

Village in Isfahan province, Iran

Qaleh Sareban Persian: قلعه ساربان
- Village
- Location within Iran
- Coordinates: 32°32′56″N 52°13′47″E
- Country: Iran
- Province: Isfahan
- County: Harand
- District: Ezhiyeh
- Rural District: Kelishad

Population (2016)
  - Total: 207
- Time zone: UTC+3:30 (IRST)

Qaleh Sareban (Persian: قلعه ساربان) (Note: Also romanized as Qal‘eh Sārbān, Qal‘eh Sārebān, and Qal‘eh-ye Sārebān) is a village in Kelishad Rural District of Ezhiyeh District in Harand County, Isfahan province, Iran.

== Demographics ==
=== Population ===
At the time of the 2006 National Census, the village's population was 189 in 39 households, when it was in Emamzadeh Abdol Aziz Rural District of Jolgeh District (Note: Renamed the Central District of Harand County) in Isfahan County. The following census in 2011 counted 192 people in 55 households. The 2016 census measured the population of the village as 207 people in 61 households.

In 2021, the district was separated from the county in the establishment of Harand County and renamed the Central District. Qaleh Sareban was transferred to Kelishad Rural District created in the new Ezhiyeh District.
