= Kafrud =

Village in Isfahan province, Iran

Kafrud Persian: كفرود
- Village
- Location within Iran
- Coordinates: 32°23′20″N 52°31′40″E
- Country: Iran
- Province: Isfahan
- County: Varzaneh
- District: Rudasht
- Rural District: Kafrud

Population (2016)
  - Total: 1,935
- Time zone: UTC+3:30 (IRST)

Kafrud (Persian: كفرود) (Note: Also romanized as Kafarved, Kafrood, and Kafrūd) is a village in Kafrud Rural District of Rudasht District in Varzaneh County, Isfahan province, Iran.

== Demographics ==
=== Population ===
At the time of the 2006 National Census, the village's population was 1,546 in 394 households, when it was in Rudasht-e Sharqi Rural District of Bon Rud District (Note: Renamed the Central District of Varzaneh County) in Isfahan County. The following census in 2011 counted 1,775 people in 503 households. The 2016 census measured the population of the village as 1,935 people in 589 households.

In 2021, the district was separated from the county in the establishment of Varzaneh County and renamed the Central District. The rural district was transferred to the new Rudasht District, and Kafrud was transferred to Kafrud Rural District created in the same district.
