= Madargan =

Village in Isfahan province, Iran

Madargan Persian: مادرگان
- Village
- Location within Iran
- Coordinates: 32°30′25″N 52°10′07″E
- Country: Iran
- Province: Isfahan
- County: Harand
- District: Ezhiyeh
- Rural District: Kelishad

Population (2016)
  - Total: 208
- Time zone: UTC+3:30 (IRST)

Madargan (Persian: مادرگان) (Note: Also romanized as Mādargān; also known as Mādarkān (مادركان) and Mādarkūn) is a village in Kelishad Rural District of Ezhiyeh District in Harand County, Isfahan province, Iran.

== Demographics ==
=== Population ===
At the time of the 2006 National Census, the village's population was 218 in 53 households, when it was in Emamzadeh Abdol Aziz Rural District of Jolgeh District (Note: Renamed the Central District of Harand County) in Isfahan County. The following census in 2011 counted 204 people in 60 households. The 2016 census measured the population of the village as 208 people in 67 households.

In 2021, the district was separated from the county in the establishment of Harand County and renamed the Central District. Madargan was transferred to Kelishad Rural District created in the new Ezhiyeh District.
