= Sharafabad =

Sharafabad (Persian: شرف اباد) may refer to:

- Bahadurgarh, India
- Sharafabad, Ardabil, Iran
- Sharafabad, East Azerbaijan, Iran
- Sharafabad, Fars, Iran
- Sharafabad, Kerman, Iran
- Sharafabad, Kermanshah, Iran
- Sharafabad, Lorestan, Iran
- Sharafabad, Mazandaran, Iran
- Sharafabad, Semnan, Iran
- Sharafabad, Yazd, Iran
- Sharafabad-e Bala, Iran
- Sharafabad-e Mastufi, Iran
- Sharafabad-e Pain, Iran

== See also ==
- Sharifabad (disambiguation)
