= Seyyedan, Isfahan =

Village in Isfahan province, Iran

Seyyedan Persian: سيدان
- Village
- Location within Iran
- Coordinates: 32°31′08″N 52°15′49″E
- Country: Iran
- Province: Isfahan
- County: Harand
- District: Ezhiyeh
- Rural District: Kelishad

Population (2016)
  - Total: 227
- Time zone: UTC+3:30 (IRST)

Seyyedan (Persian: سيدان) (Note: Also romanized as Seyyedān and Sīdān; also known as Sedūn) is a village in Kelishad Rural District of Ezhiyeh District in Harand County, Isfahan province, Iran.

== Demographics ==
=== Population ===
At the time of the 2006 National Census, the village's population was 202 in 53 households, when it was in Emamzadeh Abdol Aziz Rural District of Jolgeh District (Note: Renamed the Central District of Harand County) in Isfahan County. The following census in 2011 counted 205 people in 62 households. The 2016 census measured the population of the village as 227 people in 75 households.

In 2021, the district was separated from the county in the establishment of Harand County and renamed the Central District. Seyyedan was transferred to Kelishad Rural District created in the new Ezhiyeh District.
