= Balan, Isfahan =

Village in Isfahan province, Iran

Balan Persian: بلان
- Village
- Location within Iran
- Country: Iran
- Province: Isfahan
- County: Varzaneh
- District: Central
- Rural District: Gavkhuni-ye Jonubi

Population (2016)
  - Total: 337
- Time zone: UTC+3:30 (IRST)

Balan (Persian: بلان) (Note: Also romanized as Balān; also known as Bahlan) is a village in Gavkhuni-ye Jonubi Rural District of the Central District (Note: Formerly Bon Rud District of Isfahan County) in Varzaneh County, Isfahan province, Iran.

== Demographics ==
=== Population ===
At the time of the 2006 National Census, the village's population was 311 in 88 households, when it was in Gavkhuni Rural District (Note: Renamed Gavkhuni-ye Shomali Rural District) of Bon Rud District (Note: Renamed the Central District of Varzaneh County) in Isfahan County. The following census in 2011 counted 297 people in 92 households. The 2016 census measured the population of the village as 337 people in 108 households.

In 2021, the district was separated from the county in the establishment of Varzaneh County and renamed the Central District. The rural district was renamed Gavkhuni-ye Shomali Rural District, and Balan was transferred to Gavkhuni-ye Jonubi Rural District created in the same district.
