= Sonuchi =

Village in Isfahan province, Iran

Sonuchi Persian: سنوچي
- Village
- Location within Iran
- Coordinates: 32°31′12″N 52°11′54″E
- Country: Iran
- Province: Isfahan
- County: Harand
- District: Ezhiyeh
- Rural District: Kelishad

Population (2016)
  - Total: 147
- Time zone: UTC+3:30 (IRST)

Sonuchi (Persian: سنوچي) (Note: Also romanized as Sonūchī; also known as Sownochī, Sūnīchī, Sūnochī, and Sūnūchī) is a village in Kelishad Rural District of Ezhiyeh District in Harand County, Isfahan province, Iran.

== Demographics ==
=== Population ===
At the time of the 2006 National Census, the village's population was 149 in 42 households, when it was in Emamzadeh Abdol Aziz Rural District of Jolgeh District (Note: Renamed the Central District of Harand County) in Isfahan County. The following census in 2011 counted 143 people in 46 households. The 2016 census measured the population of the village as 147 people in 47 households.

In 2021, the district was separated from the county in the establishment of Harand County and renamed the Central District. Sonuchi was transferred to Kelishad Rural District created in the new Ezhiyeh District.
