= Sichi =

Village in Isfahan province, Iran

Sichi Persian: سيچي
- Village
- Location within Iran
- Coordinates: 32°29′30″N 52°09′28″E
- Country: Iran
- Province: Isfahan
- County: Harand
- District: Ezhiyeh
- Rural District: Kelishad

Population (2016)
  - Total: 184
- Time zone: UTC+3:30 (IRST)

Sichi (Persian: سيچي) (Note: Also romanized as Sīchī; also known as Sāyech and Sūnūchi) is a village in Kelishad Rural District of Ezhiyeh District in Harand County, Isfahan province, Iran.

== Demographics ==
=== Population ===
At the time of the 2006 National Census, the village's population was 179 in 47 households, when it was in Emamzadeh Abdol Aziz Rural District of Jolgeh District (Note: Renamed the Central District of Harand County) in Isfahan County. The following census in 2011 counted 172 people in 52 households. The 2016 census measured the population of the village as 184 people in 62 households.

In 2021, the district was separated from the county in the establishment of Harand County and renamed the Central District. Sichi was transferred to Kelishad Rural District created in the new Ezhiyeh District.
