= Qehi =

Village in Isfahan province, Iran

Qehi Persian: قهی
- Village
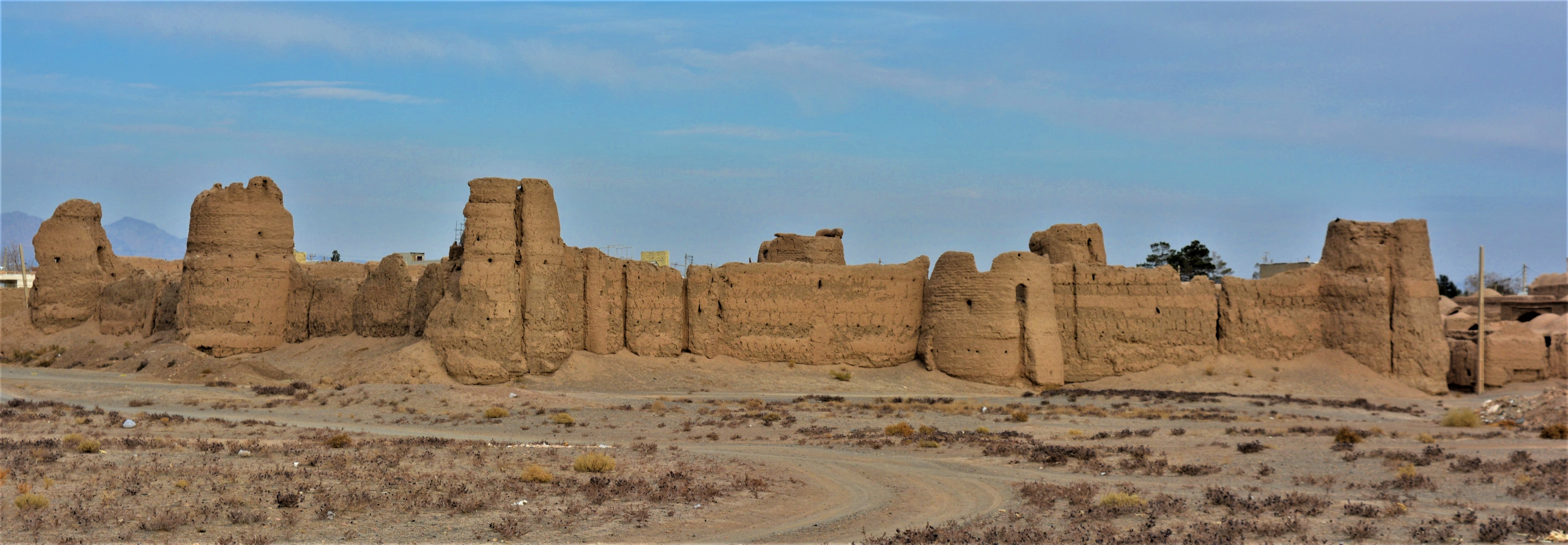
- Atashgah Castle in the village of Qehi

- Location within Iran
- Coordinates: 32°37′30″N 52°22′48″E
- Country: Iran
- Province: Isfahan
- County: Harand
- District: Central
- Rural District: Hashemabad

Population (2016)
  - Total: 855
- Time zone: UTC+3:30 (IRST)

Qehi (Persian: قهي) (Note: Also romanized as Qehī; also known as Ghehi, Ghehī, Kehi, and Pāi) is a village in Hashemabad Rural District of the Central District (Note: Formerly Jolgeh District in Isfahan County) in Harand County, Isfahan province, Iran.

== Demographics ==
=== Population ===
At the time of the 2006 National Census, the village's population was 768 in 200 households, when it was in Emamzadeh Abdol Aziz Rural District of Jolgeh District (Note: Renamed the Central District of Harand County) in Isfahan County. The following census in 2011 counted 824 people in 243 households. The 2016 census measured the population of the village as 855 people in 272 households.

In 2021, the district was separated from the county in the establishment of Harand County and renamed the Central District. Qehi was transferred to Hashemabad Rural District created in the same district.

== Historical sites, ancient artifacts and tourism ==
=== Khanabad Castle ===
Khanabad Castle is a historical castle located in Qehi in Isfahan province, The longevity of this fortress dates back to the Qajar dynasty.

=== Atashgah Castle, Qehi ===
Atashgah Castle is a historical castle belongs to the Safavid dynasty and is located in Qehi, Isfahan province in Iran.
