= Sian, Harand =

Village in Isfahan province, Iran

Sian Persian: سيان
- Village
- Location within Iran
- Coordinates: 32°28′18″N 52°24′03″E
- Country: Iran
- Province: Isfahan
- County: Harand
- District: Ezhiyeh
- Rural District: Rudasht

Population (2016)
  - Total: 556
- Time zone: UTC+3:30 (IRST)

Sian (Persian: سيان) (Note: Also romanized as Seyān, Sīān, and Sīyān; also known as Shiān, Siūni, and Sīyūnī) is a village in, and the capital of, Rudasht Rural District in Ezhiyeh District of Harand County, Isfahan province, Iran. The former capital of the rural district was the village of Ezhiyeh, now a city.

== Demographics ==
=== Population ===
At the time of the 2006 National Census, the village's population was 581 in 151 households, when it was in Jolgeh District (Note: Renamed the Central District of Harand County) of Isfahan County. The following census in 2011 counted 563 people in 161 households. The 2016 census measured the population of the village as 556 people in 167 households, the only village in its rural district reporting a population above the reporting threshold.

In 2021, the district was separated from the county in the establishment of Harand County and renamed the Central District. The rural district was transferred to the new Ezhiyeh District.
