= Abu ol Kheyr, Isfahan =

Village in Isfahan province, Iran

Abu ol Kheyr Persian: ابوالخير
- Village
- Location within Iran
- Coordinates: 32°24′41″N 52°26′41″E
- Country: Iran
- Province: Isfahan
- County: Varzaneh
- District: Rudasht
- Rural District: Kafrud

Population (2016)
  - Total: 276
- Time zone: UTC+3:30 (IRST)

Abu ol Kheyr (Persian: ابوالخير) (Note: Also romanized as Abū ol Kheyr; also known as Abolkheyr and Abowlkheyr) is a village in Kafrud Rural District of Rudasht District in Varzaneh County, Isfahan province, Iran.

== Demographics ==
=== Population ===
At the time of the 2006 National Census, the village's population was 301 in 83 households, when it was in Rudasht-e Sharqi Rural District of Bon Rud District (Note: Renamed the Central District of Varzaneh County) in Isfahan County. The following census in 2011 counted 278 people in 86 households. The 2016 census measured the population of the village as 276 people in 92 households.

In 2021, the district was separated from the county in the establishment of Varzaneh County and renamed the Central District. The rural district was transferred to the new Rudasht District, and Abu ol Kheyr was transferred to Kafrud Rural District created in the same district.
