= Abu ol Kheyr =

Abu ol Kheyr or Abowlkheyr (Persian: ابوالخير) may refer to:

- Abu ol Kheyr, Isfahan
- Abu ol Kheyr, Khuzestan

== See also ==
- Abu ol Kheyri
