= Qaleh Emam =

Village in Isfahan province, Iran

Qaleh Emam Persian: قلعه امام
- Village
- Location within Iran
- Coordinates: 32°24′58″N 52°35′26″E
- Country: Iran
- Province: Isfahan
- County: Varzaneh
- District: Central
- Rural District: Gavkhuni-ye Jonubi

Population (2016)
  - Total: 213
- Time zone: UTC+3:30 (IRST)

Qaleh Emam (Persian: قلعه امام) (Note: Also romanized as Qal‘eh Emām) is a village in Gavkhuni-ye Jonubi Rural District of the Central District (Note: Formerly Bon Rud District of Isfahan County) in Varzaneh County, Isfahan province, Iran.

== Demographics ==
=== Population ===
At the time of the 2006 National Census, the village's population was 164 in 46 households, when it was in Gavkhuni Rural District (Note: Renamed Gavkhuni-ye Shomali Rural District) of Bon Rud District (Note: Renamed the Central District of Varzaneh County) in Isfahan County. The following census in 2011 counted 185 people in 63 households. The 2016 census measured the population of the village as 213 people in 73 households.

In 2021, the district was separated from the county in the establishment of Varzaneh County and renamed the Central District. The rural district was renamed Gavkhuni-ye Shomali Rural District, and Qaleh Emam was transferred to Gavkhuni-ye Jonubi Rural District created in the same district.
