= Rangi Deh =

Village in Isfahan province, Iran

Rangi Deh Persian: رنگينده
- Village
- Location within Iran
- Coordinates: 32°26′42″N 52°26′30″E
- Country: Iran
- Province: Isfahan
- County: Varzaneh
- District: Rudasht
- Rural District: Rudasht-e Sharqi

Population (2016)
  - Total: 148
- Time zone: UTC+3:30 (IRST)

Rangi Deh (Persian: رنگينده) (Note: Also romanized as Rangī Deh; also known as Rangdeh and Zangī Deh) is a village in Rudasht-e Sharqi Rural District of Rudasht District in Varzaneh County, Isfahan province, Iran.

== Demographics ==
=== Population ===
At the time of the 2006 National Census, the village's population was 151 in 40 households, when it was in Bon Rud District (Note: Renamed the Central District of Varzaneh County) of Isfahan County. The following census in 2011 counted 161 people in 50 households. The 2016 census measured the population of the village as 148 people in 48 households.

In 2021, the district was separated from the county in the establishment of Varzaneh County and renamed the Central District. The rural district was transferred to the new Rudasht District.
