= Farfan =

Village in Isfahan province, Iran

Farfan Persian: فارفان
- Village
- Location within Iran
- Coordinates: 32°26′10″N 52°28′46″E
- Country: Iran
- Province: Isfahan
- County: Varzaneh
- District: Rudasht
- Rural District: Rudasht-e Sharqi

Population (2016)
  - Total: 1,742
- Time zone: UTC+3:30 (IRST)

Farfan (Persian: فارفان) (Note: Also romanized as Fārfān; also known as Fārfāān and Pārfūn) is a village in Rudasht-e Sharqi Rural District of Rudasht District in Varzaneh County, Isfahan province, Iran.

== Demographics ==
=== Population ===
At the time of the 2006 National Census, the village's population was 1,497 in 425 households, when it was in Bon Rud District (Note: Renamed the Central District of Varzaneh County) of Isfahan County. The following census in 2011 counted 1,660 people in 518 households. The 2016 census measured the population of the village as 1,742 people in 559 households.

In 2021, the district was separated from the county in the establishment of Varzaneh County and renamed the Central District. The rural district was transferred to the new Rudasht District.
