= Bazm, Isfahan =

Village in Isfahan province, Iran

Bazm Persian: بزم
- Village
- Location within Iran
- Coordinates: 32°24′11″N 52°33′23″E
- Country: Iran
- Province: Isfahan
- County: Varzaneh
- District: Central
- Rural District: Gavkhuni-ye Jonubi

Population (2016)
  - Total: 838
- Time zone: UTC+3:30 (IRST)

Bazm (Persian: بزم) is a village in Gavkhuni-ye Jonubi Rural District of the Central District (Note: Formerly Bon Rud District of Isfahan County) in Varzaneh County, Isfahan province, Iran.

== Demographics ==
=== Population ===
At the time of the 2006 National Census, the village's population was 715 in 180 households, when it was in Gavkhuni Rural District (Note: Renamed Gavkhuni-ye Shomali Rural District) of Bon Rud District (Note: Renamed the Central District of Varzaneh County) in Isfahan County. The following census in 2011 counted 835 people in 235 households. The 2016 census measured the population of the village as 838 people in 246 households.

In 2021, the district was separated from the county in the establishment of Varzaneh County and renamed the Central District. The rural district was renamed Gavkhuni-ye Shomali Rural District, and Bazm was transferred to Gavkhuni-ye Jonubi Rural District created in the same district.
