= Sharifabad, Ezhiyeh =

Village in Isfahan province, Iran

Sharifabad Persian: شريف اباد
- Village
- Location within Iran
- Coordinates: 32°27′40″N 52°16′17″E
- Country: Iran
- Province: Isfahan
- County: Harand
- District: Ezhiyeh
- Rural District: Kelishad

Population (2016)
  - Total: 617
- Time zone: UTC+3:30 (IRST)

Sharifabad (Persian: شريف اباد) (Note: Also romanized as Sharīfābād) is a village in Kelishad Rural District of Ezhiyeh District in Harand County, Isfahan province, Iran.

== Demographics ==
=== Population ===
At the time of the 2006 National Census, the village's population was 553 in 152 households, when it was in Emamzadeh Abdol Aziz Rural District of Jolgeh District (Note: Renamed the Central District of Harand County) in Isfahan County. The following census in 2011 counted 578 people in 189 households. The 2016 census measured the population of the village as 617 people in 215 households.

In 2021, the district was separated from the county in the establishment of Harand County and renamed the Central District. Sharifabad was transferred to Kelishad Rural District created in the new Ezhiyeh District.
