= Kafran =

Village in Isfahan province, Iran

Kafran Persian: كفران
- Village
- Location within Iran
- Coordinates: 32°25′35″N 52°28′30″E
- Country: Iran
- Province: Isfahan
- County: Varzaneh
- District: Rudasht
- Rural District: Rudasht-e Sharqi

Population (2016)
  - Total: 2,679
- Time zone: UTC+3:30 (IRST)

Kafran (Persian: كفران) (Note: Also romanized as Kafrān; also known as Kafrūn and Keiron) is a village in Rudasht-e Sharqi Rural District of Rudasht District in Varzaneh County, Isfahan province, Iran, serving as capital of both the district and the rural district.

== Demographics ==
=== Population ===
At the time of the 2006 National Census, the village's population was 2,349 in 645 households, when it was in Bon Rud District (Note: Renamed the Central District of Varzaneh County) of Isfahan County. The following census in 2011 counted 2,381 people in 748 households. The 2016 census measured the population of the village as 2,679 people in 887 households, the most populous in its rural district.

In 2021, the district was separated from the county in the establishment of Varzaneh County and renamed the Central District. The rural district was transferred to the new Rudasht District.
