= Gishi, Isfahan =

Village in Isfahan province, Iran

Gishi Persian: گيشي
- Village
- Location within Iran
- Coordinates: 32°29′19″N 52°21′14″E
- Country: Iran
- Province: Isfahan
- County: Harand
- District: Central
- Rural District: Emamzadeh Abdol Aziz

Population (2016)
  - Total: 874
- Time zone: UTC+3:30 (IRST)

Gishi (Persian: گيشي) (Note: Also romanized as Geyshī and Gīshī) is a village in Emamzadeh Abdol Aziz Rural District of the Central District (Note: Formerly Jolgeh District of Isfahan County) in Harand County, Isfahan province, Iran.

== Demographics ==
=== Population ===
At the time of the 2006 National Census, the village's population was 780 in 206 households, when it was in Jolgeh District (Note: Renamed the Central District of Harand County) of Isfahan County. The following census in 2011 counted 801 people in 243 households. The 2016 census measured the population of the village as 874 people in 273 households.

In 2021, the district was separated from the county in the establishment of Harand County and renamed the Central District.
