= Sunuchi =

Sunuchi (Persian: سونوچي) may refer to:

- Sichi
- Sonuchi
