= Oshkohran =

Village in Isfahan province, Iran

Oshkohran Persian: اشكهران
- Village
- Location within Iran
- Coordinates: 32°26′24″N 52°34′37″E
- Country: Iran
- Province: Isfahan
- County: Varzaneh
- District: Central
- Rural District: Gavkhuni-ye Jonubi

Population (2016)
  - Total: 1,463
- Time zone: UTC+3:30 (IRST)

Oshkohran (Persian: اشكهران) (Note: Also romanized as Ashkohrān and Oshkohrān) is a village in, and the capital of, Gavkhuni-ye Jonubi Rural District in the Central District (Note: Formerly Bon Rud District of Isfahan County) of Varzaneh County, Isfahan province, Iran.

== Demographics ==
=== Population ===
At the time of the 2006 National Census, the village's population was 1,339 in 309 households, when it was in Gavkhuni Rural District (Note: Renamed Gavkhuni-ye Shomali Rural District) of Bon Rud District (Note: Renamed the Central District of Varzaneh County) in Isfahan County. The following census in 2011 counted 1,409 people in 359 households. The 2016 census measured the population of the village as 1,463 people in 417 households, the most populous in its rural district.

In 2021, the district was separated from the county in the establishment of Varzaneh County and renamed the Central District. The rural district was renamed Gavkhuni-ye Shomali Rural District, and Oshkohran was transferred to Gavkhuni-ye Jonubi Rural District created in the same district.
