= Qomishan =

Qomishan (Persian: قميشان) may refer to:

- Qomishan, Isfahan
- Qomishan, West Azerbaijan

== See also ==
- Qamishan (disambiguation)
