= Kelil, Isfahan =

Village in Isfahan province, Iran

Kelil Persian: كليل
- Village
- Location within Iran
- Coordinates: 32°31′34″N 52°17′13″E
- Country: Iran
- Province: Isfahan
- County: Harand
- District: Central
- Rural District: Emamzadeh Abdol Aziz

Population (2016)
  - Total: 33
- Time zone: UTC+3:30 (IRST)

Kelil (Persian: كليل) (Note: Also romanized as Kelīl) is a village in Emamzadeh Abdol Aziz Rural District of the Central District (Note: Formerly Jolgeh District of Isfahan County) in Harand County, Isfahan province, Iran.

== Demographics ==
=== Population ===
At the time of the 2006 National Census, the village's population was 31 in seven households, when it was in Jolgeh District (Note: Renamed the Central District of Harand County) of Isfahan County. The following census in 2011 counted 34 people in 10 households. The 2016 census measured the population of the village as 33 people in 10 households.

In 2021, the district was separated from the county in the establishment of Harand County and renamed the Central District.
