= Hashemabad, Emamzadeh Abdol Aziz =

Village in Isfahan province, Iran

Hashemabad Persian: هاشم اباد
- Village
- Location within Iran
- Coordinates: 32°31′25″N 52°17′07″E
- Country: Iran
- Province: Isfahan
- County: Harand
- District: Central
- Rural District: Emamzadeh Abdol Aziz

Population (2016)
  - Total: 93
- Time zone: UTC+3:30 (IRST)

Hashemabad (Persian: هاشم اباد) (Note: Also romanized as Hāshemābād) is a village in Emamzadeh Abdol Aziz Rural District of the Central District (Note: Formerly Jolgeh District of Isfahan County) in Harand County, Isfahan province, Iran.

== Demographics ==
=== Population ===
At the time of the 2006 National Census, the village's population was 89 in 28 households, when it was in Jolgeh District (Note: Renamed the Central District of Harand County) of Isfahan County. The following census in 2011 counted 95 people in 32 households. The 2016 census measured the population of the village as 93 people in 32 households.

In 2021, the district was separated from the county in the establishment of Harand County and renamed the Central District.
