= Emamzadeh Abdol Aziz =

Village in Isfahan province, Iran

Emamzadeh Abdol Aziz Persian: امامزاده عبدالعزيز
- Village
- Location within Iran
- Coordinates: 32°29′36″N 52°16′13″E
- Country: Iran
- Province: Isfahan
- County: Harand
- District: Central
- Rural District: Emamzadeh Abdol Aziz

Population (2016)
  - Total: 2,493
- Time zone: UTC+3:30 (IRST)

Emamzadeh Abdol Aziz (Persian: امامزاده عبدالعزيز) (Note: Also romanized as Emāmzādeh ʿAbdol ʿAzīz; formerly known as Shahtur (شاهطور); also known as Emāmzādeh ‘Abdollāh and Emāmzādeh Shāhzādeh ‘Abdollāh) is a village in, and the capital of, Emamzadeh Abdol Aziz Rural District of the Central District (Note: Formerly Jolgeh District of Isfahan County) in Harand County, Isfahan province, Iran.

== Demographics ==
=== Population ===
At the time of the 2006 National Census, the village's population was 2,297 in 591 households, when it was in Jolgeh District (Note: Renamed the Central District of Harand County) of Isfahan County. The following census in 2011 counted 2,535 people in 750 households. The 2016 census measured the population of the village as 2,493 people in 816 households, the most populous in its rural district.

In 2021, the district was separated from the county in the establishment of Harand County and renamed the Central District.
