= Qaleh-ye Bala, Isfahan =

Village in Isfahan province, Iran

Qaleh-ye Bala Persian: قلعه بالا
- Village
- Location within Iran
- Coordinates: 32°28′07″N 52°20′26″E
- Country: Iran
- Province: Isfahan
- County: Harand
- District: Central
- Rural District: Emamzadeh Abdol Aziz

Population (2016)
  - Total: 388
- Time zone: UTC+3:30 (IRST)

Qaleh-ye Bala (Persian: قلعه بالا) (Note: Also romanized as Qal‘ehbālā, Qal‘eh-e Bālā, and Qal‘eh-ye Bālā; formerly known as Qaleh-ye Bala-ye Sian (قلعه بالاسيان), also romanized as Qal‘eh-ye Bālā-ye Sīān) is a village in Emamzadeh Abdol Aziz Rural District of the Central District (Note: Formerly Jolgeh District of Isfahan County) in Harand County, Isfahan province, Iran.

== Demographics ==
=== Population ===
At the time of the 2006 National Census, the village's population, as Qaleh-ye Bala-ye Sian, was 340 in 79 households, when it was in Jolgeh District (Note: Renamed the Central District of Harand County) of Isfahan County. The following census in 2011 counted 350 people in 98 households, by which time the village was listed as Qaleh-ye Bala. The 2016 census measured the population of the village as 388 people in 123 households.

In 2021, the district was separated from the county in the establishment of Harand County and renamed the Central District.
