= Aegeae =

Aegeae or Aigeai (Ancient Greek: Αἰγέαι) may refer to:

- Aegeae (Macedon), ancient capital of Macedon
- Aegeae (Cilicia), ancient town of Cilicia, now in Turkey
- Aegeae, Esfahan Province, a city in Isfahan Province, Iran
