= Kafrud Rural District =

Rural district in Isfahan province, Iran

Kafrud Rural District Persian: دهستان کفرود
- Rural District
- Location within Iran
- Coordinates: 32°16′N 52°41′E
- Country: Iran
- Province: Isfahan
- County: Varzaneh
- District: Rudasht
- Established: 2021
- Capital: Jondan
- Time zone: UTC+3:30 (IRST)

Kafrud Rural District (Persian: دهستان کفرود) is in Rudasht District of Varzaneh County, Isfahan province, Iran. Its capital is the village of Jondan, whose population at the time of the National Census of 2016 was 1,998 people in 651 households.

== History ==
In 2021, Bon Rud District (Note: Renamed the Central District of Varzaneh County) was separated from Isfahan County in the establishment of Varzaneh County and renamed the Central District. Kafrud Rural District was created in the new Rudasht District.

== Other villages in the rural district ==
- Abu ol Kheyr
- Kafrud
- Tahmuresat
