= Urun =

Urun may refer to:

- Ürün, a Turkish magazine
- Urun, Iran, a village in Isfahan Province, Iran
