= Kelishad Rural District =

Rural district in Isfahan province, Iran

Kelishad Rural District Persian: دهستان کلیشاد
- Rural District
- Location within Iran
- Coordinates: 32°30′N 52°10′E
- Country: Iran
- Province: Isfahan
- County: Harand
- District: Ezhiyeh
- Established: 2021
- Capital: Kelishad
- Time zone: UTC+3:30 (IRST)

Kelishad Rural District (Persian: دهستان کلیشاد) is in Ezhiyeh District of Harand County, Isfahan province, Iran. Its capital is the village of Kelishad, whose population at the time of the 2016 National Census was 343 people in 109 households.

== History ==
In 2021, Jolgeh District (Note: Renamed the Central District of Harand County) was separated from Isfahan County in the establishment of Harand County and renamed the Central District. Kelishad Rural District was created in the new Ezhiyeh District.

== Other villages in the rural district ==
- Feyzabad
- Halarteh
- Jombozeh
- Kamandan
- Khorram
- Khvorchan
- Madargan
- Marchi
- Pajikabad
- Qaleh Abdollah
- Qaleh Sareban
- Sereyan
- Seyyedan
- Sharifabad
- Sichi
- Sokkan
- Sonuchi
