= Aliabad-e Shahid =

Aliabad-e Shahid (Persian: علي اباد شهيد) may refer to:

- Aliabad-e Shahid, Kerman
- Aliabad-e Shahid, Razavi Khorasan
