= Qurtan =

Village in Isfahan province, Iran

Qurtan Persian: قورتان
- Village
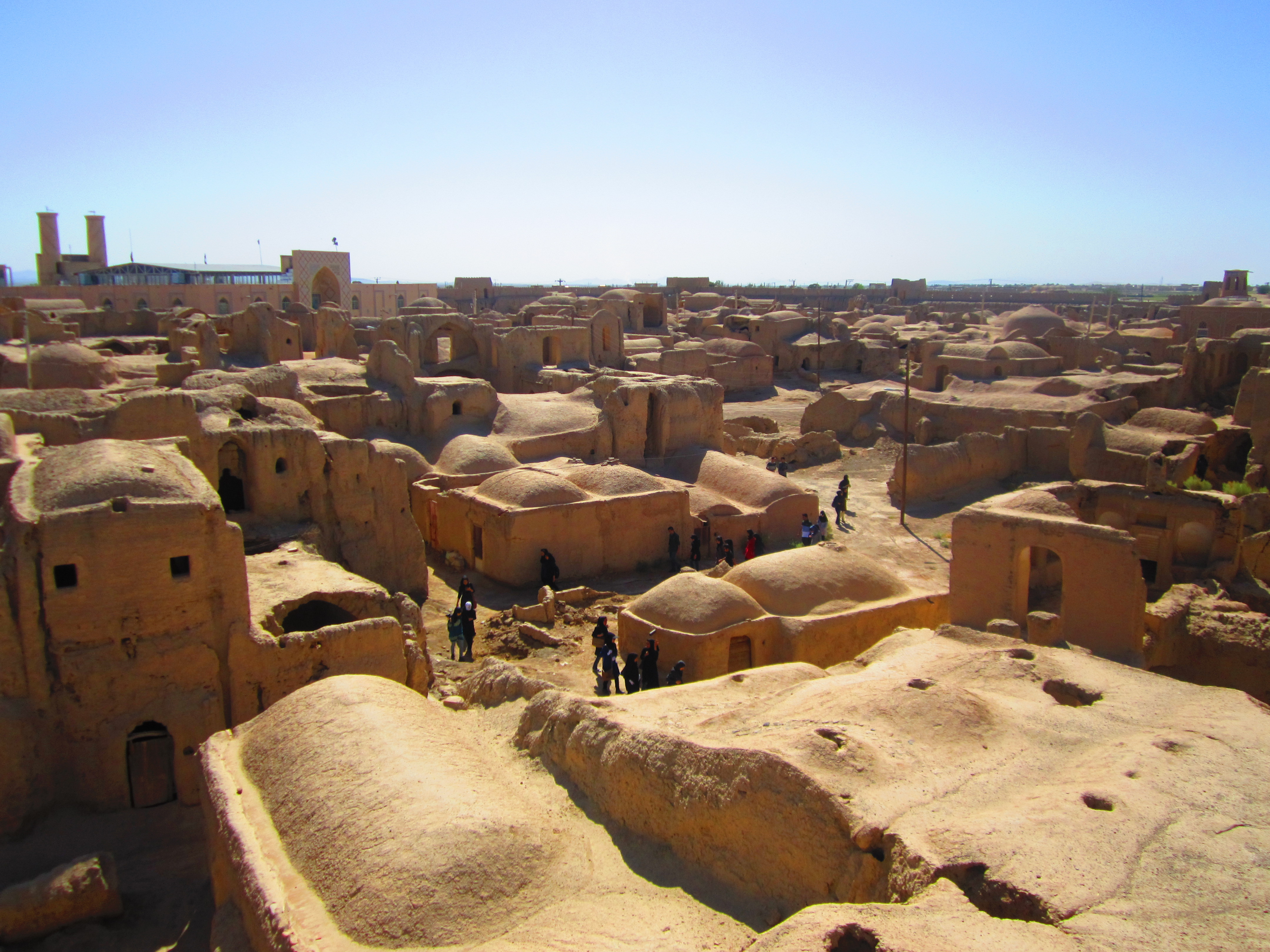
- The village of Qurtan

- Location within Iran
- Coordinates: 32°27′03″N 52°33′30″E
- Country: Iran
- Province: Isfahan
- County: Varzaneh
- District: Central
- Rural District: Gavkhuni-ye Shomali

Population (2016)
  - Total: 1,283
- Time zone: UTC+3:30 (IRST)

Qurtan (Persian: قورتان) (Note: Also romanized as Qūrtān; also known as Ghoortan, Qurtūn, and Urūn) is a village in, and the capital of, Gavkhuni-ye Shomali Rural District (Note: Formerly Gavkhuni Rural District) in the Central District (Note: Formerly Bon Rud District of Isfahan County) of Varzaneh County, Isfahan province, Iran.

== Demographics ==
=== Population ===
At the time of the 2006 National Census, the village's population was 1,177 in 318 households, when it was in Gavkhuni Rural District (Note: Renamed Gavkhuni-ye Shomali Rural District) of Bon Rud District (Note: Renamed the Central District of Varzaneh County) in Isfahan County. The following census in 2011 counted 1,242 people in 378 households. The 2016 census measured the population of the village as 1,283 people in 409 households.

In 2021, the district was separated from the county in the establishment of Varzaneh County and renamed the Central District. The rural district was renamed Gavkhuni-ye Shomali Rural District.
