= Qamishan =

Qamishan (Persian: قميشن) may refer to:

- Qamishan, Hamadan
- Qamishan, Isfahan

== See also ==
- Qomishan (disambiguation)
