= Aliabad-e Shahid, Kerman =

Aliabad-e Shahid علي ابادشهيد
- Village
- Location within Iran
- Coordinates: 30°36′45″N 55°36′12″E
- Country: Iran
- Province: Kerman
- County: Rafsanjan
- Bakhsh: Koshkuiyeh
- Rural District: Sharifabad

Population (2006)
  - Total: 1,042
- Time zone: UTC+3:30 (IRST)
  - Summer (DST): UTC+4:30 (IRDT)

Aliabad-e Shahid (Persian: علي ابادشهيد, also Romanized as ‘Alīābād-e Shahīd; also known as ‘Alīābād, ‘Alīābād-e Vazīr, and Ali Abad Vazir) is a village in Sharifabad Rural District, Koshkuiyeh District, Rafsanjan County, Kerman Province, Iran. At the 2006 census, its population was 1,042, in 247 families.
