= Hashemabad Rural District =

Rural district in Isfahan province, Iran

Hashemabad Rural District Persian: دهستان هاشم‌آباد
- Rural District
- Location within Iran
- Coordinates: 32°35′N 52°29′E
- Country: Iran
- Province: Isfahan
- County: Harand
- District: Central
- Established: 2021
- Capital: Hashemabad
- Time zone: UTC+3:30 (IRST)

Hashemabad Rural District (Persian: دهستان هاشم‌آباد) is in the Central District (Note: Formerly Jolgeh District of Isfahan County) of Harand County, Isfahan province, Iran. Its capital is the village of Hashemabad, whose population at the time of the 2016 National Census was 93 people in 32 households.

== History ==
In 2021, Jolgeh District (Note: Renamed the Central District of Harand County) was separated from Isfahan County in the establishment of Harand County and renamed the Central District. Hashemabad Rural District was created in the same district.

== Other villages in the rural district ==
- Baqerabad
- Kebrit
- Qehi
- Sharifabad
