= Rudasht Rural District =

Rural district in Isfahan province, Iran

Rudasht Rural District Persian: دهستان رودشت
- Rural District
- Location within Iran
- Coordinates: 32°25′N 52°20′E
- Country: Iran
- Province: Isfahan
- County: Harand
- District: Ezhiyeh
- Established: 1987
- Capital: Sian

Population (2016)
  - Total: 556
- Time zone: UTC+3:30 (IRST)

Rudasht Rural District (Persian: دهستان رودشت) is in Ezhiyeh District of Harand County, Isfahan province, Iran. Its capital is the village of Sian. The previous capital of the rural district was the village of Ezhiyeh, now a city.

== Demographics ==
=== Population ===
At the time of the 2006 National Census, the rural district's population (as a part of Jolgeh District (Note: Renamed the Central District of Harand County) in Isfahan County) was 586 in 153 households. There were 581 inhabitants in 169 households at the following census of 2011. The 2016 census measured the population of the rural district as 560 in 169 households. The only one of its 21 villages reporting a population above the reporting threshold was Sian, with 556 people.

In 2021, the district was separated from the county in the establishment of Harand County and renamed the Central District. The rural district was transferred to the new Ezhiyeh District.
