= Qomshan =

Village in Isfahan province, Iran

Qomshan Persian: قمشان
- Village
- Location within Iran
- Coordinates: 32°29′36″N 52°19′24″E
- Country: Iran
- Province: Isfahan
- County: Harand
- District: Central
- Rural District: Emamzadeh Abdol Aziz

Population (2016)
  - Total: 399
- Time zone: UTC+3:30 (IRST)

Qomshan (Persian: قمشان) (Note: Also romanized as Qamshān and Qomshān; also known as Qamīshan and Qomīshān) is a village in Emamzadeh Abdol Aziz Rural District of the Central District (Note: Formerly Jolgeh District of Isfahan County) in Harand County, Isfahan province, Iran.

== Demographics ==
=== Population ===
At the time of the 2006 National Census, the village's population was 356 in 91 households, when it was in Jolgeh District (Note: Renamed the Central District of Harand County) of Isfahan County. The following census in 2011 counted 367 people in 107 households. The 2016 census measured the population of the village as 399 people in 123 households.

In 2021, the district was separated from the county in the establishment of Harand County and renamed the Central District.
