= Sharifabad Rural District =

Sharifabad Rural District (Persian: دهستان شريف آباد) may refer to:

- Sharifabad Rural District (Rafsanjan County), Kerman province
- Sharifabad Rural District (Sirjan County), Kerman province
- Sharifabad Rural District (Qazvin Province)
- Sharifabad Rural District (Pakdasht County), Tehran province
