= Sharifabad, Bijar =

Sharifabad شريف آباد
- Village
- Location within Iran
- Coordinates: 36°01′15″N 47°40′11″E
- Country: Iran
- Province: Kurdistan
- County: Bijar
- Bakhsh: Central
- Rural District: Khvor Khvoreh

Population (2006)
  - Total: 44
- Time zone: UTC+3:30 (IRST)
  - Summer (DST): UTC+4:30 (IRDT)

Sharifabad (Persian: شريف آباد, also Romanized as Sharīfābād) is a village in Khvor Khvoreh Rural District, in the Central District of Bijar County, Kurdistan Province, Iran. At the 2006 census, its population was 44, in 15 families. The village is populated by Kurds.
