= Harand, Iran =

City in Isfahan province, Iran

Harand Persian: هرند
- City
- Location within Iran
- Coordinates: 32°33′55″N 52°26′11″E
- Country: Iran
- Province: Isfahan
- County: Harand
- District: Central

Population (2016)
  - Total: 7,829
- Time zone: UTC+3:30 (IRST)

Harand (Persian: هرند) (Note: Also known as Hājiābād) is a city in the Central District (Note: Formerly Jolgeh District of Isfahan County) of Harand County, Isfahan province, Iran, serving as capital of both the county and the district.

== Demographics ==
=== Language ===
Linguistic composition of the city consists solely of Persian dialects being spoken.

=== Population ===
At the time of the 2006 National Census, the city's population was 6,613 in 1,856 households, when it was in Jolgeh District (Note: Renamed the Central District of Harand County) of Isfahan County. The following census in 2011 counted 7,108 people in 2,148 households. The 2016 census measured the population of the city as 7,829 people in 2,478 households.

In 2021, the district was separated from the county in the establishment of Harand County and renamed the Central District, with Harand as the new county's capital.

== Notable people ==
Iranian Cleric Mohiaddin Fazl Harandi is from here.
