= Sharifabad-e Chah Kan =

Sharifabad-e Chah Kan شريف ابادچه كان
- Village
- Country: Iran
- Province: Sistan and Baluchestan
- County: Khash
- Bakhsh: Central
- Rural District: Karvandar

Population (2006)
  - Total: 178
- Time zone: UTC+3:30 (IRST)
  - Summer (DST): UTC+4:30 (IRDT)

Sharifabad-e Chah Kan (Persian: شريف ابادچه كان, also Romanized as Sharīfābād-e Chah Kān) is a village in Karvandar Rural District, in the Central District of Khash County, Sistan and Baluchestan Province, Iran. At the 2006 census, its population was 178, in 46 families.
