= Sharifabad-e Tajar =

Sharifabad-e Tajar شريف ابادطجر
- Village
- Location within Iran
- Coordinates: 34°15′53″N 48°38′18″E
- Country: Iran
- Province: Hamadan
- County: Malayer
- Bakhsh: Samen
- Rural District: Haram Rud-e Sofla

Population (2006)
  - Total: 176
- Time zone: UTC+3:30 (IRST)
  - Summer (DST): UTC+4:30 (IRDT)

Sharifabad-e Tajar (Persian: شريف ابادطجر, also Romanized as Sharīfābād-e Ţajar; also known as Sharīfābād and Sharif Abad Samen) is a village in Haram Rud-e Sofla Rural District, Samen District, Malayer County, Hamadan Province, Iran. At the 2006 census, its population was 176, in 50 families.
