= Gavkhuni-ye Jonubi Rural District =

Rural district in Isfahan province, Iran

Gavkhuni-ye Jonubi Rural District Persian: دهستان گاوخونی جنوبی
- Rural District
- Location within Iran
- Coordinates: 32°21′N 52°41′E
- Country: Iran
- Province: Isfahan
- County: Varzaneh
- District: Central
- Established: 2021
- Capital: Oshkohran
- Time zone: UTC+3:30 (IRST)

Gavkhuni-ye Jonubi Rural District (Persian: دهستان گاوخونی جنوبی) is in the Central District (Note: Formerly Bon Rud District of Isfahan County) of Varzaneh County, Isfahan province, Iran. Its capital is the village of Oshkohran, whose population at the time of the 2016 National Census was 1,463 people in 417 households.

== History ==
In 2021, Bon Rud District (Note: Renamed the Central District of Varzaneh County) was separated from Isfahan County in the establishment of Varzaneh County and renamed the Central District. Gavkhuni-ye Jonubi Rural District was created in the same district.

== Other villages in the rural district ==
- Balan
- Bazm
- Qaleh Emam
- Sohran
