= Ezhiyeh =

City in Isfahan province, Iran

Ezhiyeh Persian: اژيه
- City
- Location within Iran
- Coordinates: 32°26′16″N 52°22′44″E
- Country: Iran
- Province: Isfahan
- County: Harand
- District: Ezhiyeh
- Established as a city: 1996

Population (2016)
  - Total: 3,156
- Time zone: UTC+3:30 (IRST)

Ezhiyeh (Persian: اژيه) (Note: Also romanized as Azhyeh, Ezhieh, and Ezhyeh; also known as Ejiyeh) is a city in, and the capital of, Ezhiyeh District in Harand County, Isfahan province, Iran. As a village, it served as the capital of Rudasht Rural District until its capital was transferred to the village of Sian. Ezhiyeh was converted to a city in 1996 and is about 75 kilometers southeast of Isfahan.

== Demographics ==
=== Language ===
Linguistic composition of the city consists solely of Persian dialects.

=== Population ===
At the time of the 2006 National Census, the city's population was 3,309 in 948 households, when it was in Jolgeh District (Note: Renamed the Central District of Harand County) of Isfahan County. The following census in 2011 counted 3,481 people in 1,094 households. The 2016 census measured the population of the city as 3,156 people in 1,081 households.

In 2021, the district was separated from the county in the establishment of Harand County and renamed the Central District. Ezhiyeh was transferred to the new Ezhiyeh District.

== Notable people ==
Iranian Chief of Justice and cleric Gholam-Hossein Mohseni-Eje'i is from Ezhiyeh.
