= Sharifabad, Sonqor =

Sharifabad شريف اباد
- Village
- Location within Iran
- Coordinates: 34°52′22″N 47°44′04″E
- Country: Iran
- Province: Kermanshah
- County: Sonqor
- Bakhsh: Central
- Rural District: Bavaleh

Population (2006)
  - Total: 109
- Time zone: UTC+3:30 (IRST)
  - Summer (DST): UTC+4:30 (IRDT)

Sharifabad (Persian: شريف اباد, also romanized as Sharīfābād) is a village in Bavaleh Rural District, in the Central District of Sonqor County, Kermanshah Province, Iran. At the 2006 census, its population was 109, in 18 families.
