= Qamisheh =

Qamisheh قاميشه
- Village
- Location within Iran
- Coordinates: 36°11′27″N 45°37′02″E
- Country: Iran
- Province: West Azerbaijan
- County: Sardasht
- Bakhsh: Central
- Rural District: Gavork-e Sardasht

Population (2006)
  - Total: 46
- Time zone: UTC+3:30 (IRST)
  - Summer (DST): UTC+4:30 (IRDT)

Qamisheh (Persian: قاميشه, also Romanized as Qāmīsheh; also known as Qomīshān) is a village in Gavork-e Sardasht Rural District, in the Central District of Sardasht County, West Azerbaijan Province, Iran. At the 2006 census, its population was 46, in 9 families.
