= Sirlan =

Sirlan سيرلان
- Village
- Location within Iran
- Coordinates: 35°45′06″N 47°38′31″E
- Country: Iran
- Province: Kurdistan
- County: Bijar
- Bakhsh: Chang Almas
- Rural District: Babarashani

Population (2006)
  - Total: 77
- Time zone: UTC+3:30 (IRST)
  - Summer (DST): UTC+4:30 (IRDT)

Sirlan (Persian: سيرلان, also Romanized as Sīrlān and Sirelān; also known as Sariland, Sharīfābād, and Shrīfābād) is a village in Babarashani Rural District, Chang Almas District, Bijar County, Kurdistan Province, Iran. At the 2006 census, its population was 77, in 21 families. The village is populated by Kurds.
