= Sharifabad, Anbarabad =

Sharifabad شريف اباد
- Village
- Location within Iran
- Coordinates: 28°26′29″N 57°44′17″E
- Country: Iran
- Province: Kerman
- County: Anbarabad
- Bakhsh: Esmaili
- Rural District: Hoseynabad

Population (2006)
  - Total: 643
- Time zone: UTC+3:30 (IRST)
  - Summer (DST): UTC+4:30 (IRDT)

Sharifabad (Persian: شريف اباد, also Romanized as Sharīfābād) is a village in Hoseynabad Rural District, Esmaili District, Anbarabad County, Kerman Province, Iran. At the 2006 census, its population was 643, in 137 families.
