= Sharifabad, Rafsanjan =

Village in Kerman province, Iran

Sharifabad Persian: شريف اباد
- Village
- Location within Iran
- Coordinates: 30°35′55″N 55°36′43″E
- Country: Iran
- Province: Kerman
- County: Rafsanjan
- District: Koshkuiyeh
- Rural District: Sharifabad

Population (2016)
  - Total: 2,799
- Time zone: UTC+3:30 (IRST)

Sharifabad (Persian: شريف اباد) (Note: Also romanized as Sharīfābād) is a village in, and the capital of, Sharifabad Rural District of Koshkuiyeh District, Rafsanjan County, Kerman province, Iran.

== Demographics ==
=== Population ===
At the time of the 2006 National Census, the village's population was 2,272 in 554 households. The following census in 2011 counted 3,072 people in 815 households. The 2016 census measured the population of the village as 2,799 people in 783 households. It was the most populous village in its rural district.
