= Sharafabad-e Mastufi =

Sharafabad-e Mastufi شرف ابادمستوفي
- Village
- Location within Iran
- Coordinates: 32°15′51″N 48°21′36″E
- Country: Iran
- Province: Khuzestan
- County: Dezful
- Bakhsh: Central
- Rural District: Qeblehi

Population (2006)
  - Total: 59
- Time zone: UTC+3:30 (IRST)
  - Summer (DST): UTC+4:30 (IRDT)

Sharafabad-e Mastufi (Persian: شرف ابادمستوفي, also Romanized as Sharafābād-e Mastūfī; also known as Sharafābād) is a village in Qeblehi Rural District, in the Central District of Dezful County, Khuzestan Province, Iran. At the 2006 census, its population was 59, in 11 families.
