= Abu ol Kheyr, Khuzestan =

Abu ol Kheyr ابوالخير
- Village
- Location within Iran
- Coordinates: 31°33′31″N 50°17′14″E
- Country: Iran
- Province: Khuzestan
- County: Izeh
- Bakhsh: Dehdez
- Rural District: Donbaleh Rud-e Jonubi

Population (2006)
  - Total: 287
- Time zone: UTC+3:30 (IRST)
  - Summer (DST): UTC+4:30 (IRDT)

Abu ol Kheyr (Persian: ابوالخير, also Romanized as Abū ol Kheyr) is a village in Donbaleh Rud-e Jonubi Rural District, Dehdez District, Izeh County, Khuzestan Province, Iran. At the 2006 census, its population was 287, in 48 families.
