= Varzaneh =

City in Isfahan province, Iran

Varzaneh Persian: ورزنه
- City
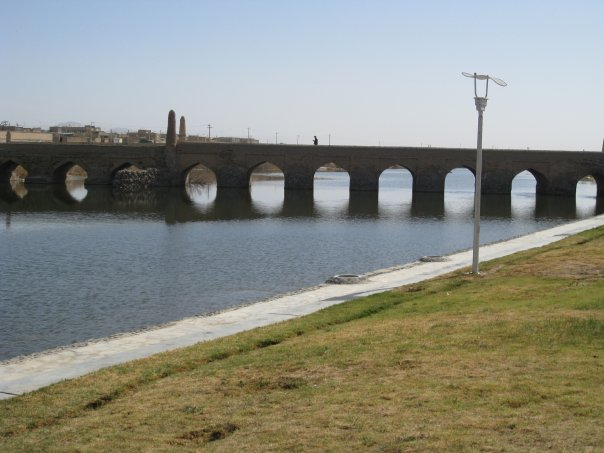
- The old bridge of Varzaneh

- Location within Iran
- Coordinates: 32°25′11″N 52°38′52″E
- Country: Iran
- Province: Isfahan
- County: Varzaneh
- District: Central

Population (2016)
  - Total: 12,714
- Time zone: UTC+3:30 (IRST)
- Website: www.varzaneh.ir

Varzaneh (Persian: ورزنه) is a city in the Central District (Note: Formerly Bon Rud District of Isfahan County) of Varzaneh County, Isfahan province, Iran, serving as capital of both the county and the district.

== Demographics ==
=== Population ===
At the time of the 2006 National Census, the city's population was 11,506 in 2,981 households, when it was in Bon Rud District (Note: Renamed the Central District of Varzaneh County) of Isfahan County. The following census in 2011 counted 11,924 people in 3,443 households. The 2016 census measured the population of the city as 12,714 people in 3,900 households.

In 2021, the district was separated from the county in the establishment of Varzaneh County and renamed the Central District, with Varzaneh as the new county's capital.

== Geography ==
Varzaneh is 105 km southeast of Isfahan and 240 km from Yazd. The area of this city is more than 2,300 square kilometers and it lies at an altitude of 1,477 meters above sea level. Its climate is desert and completely dry, so that in July, its temperature reaches 40 degrees Celsius. Temperatures sometimes drop below zero after midnight in January and February.

== Gallery ==
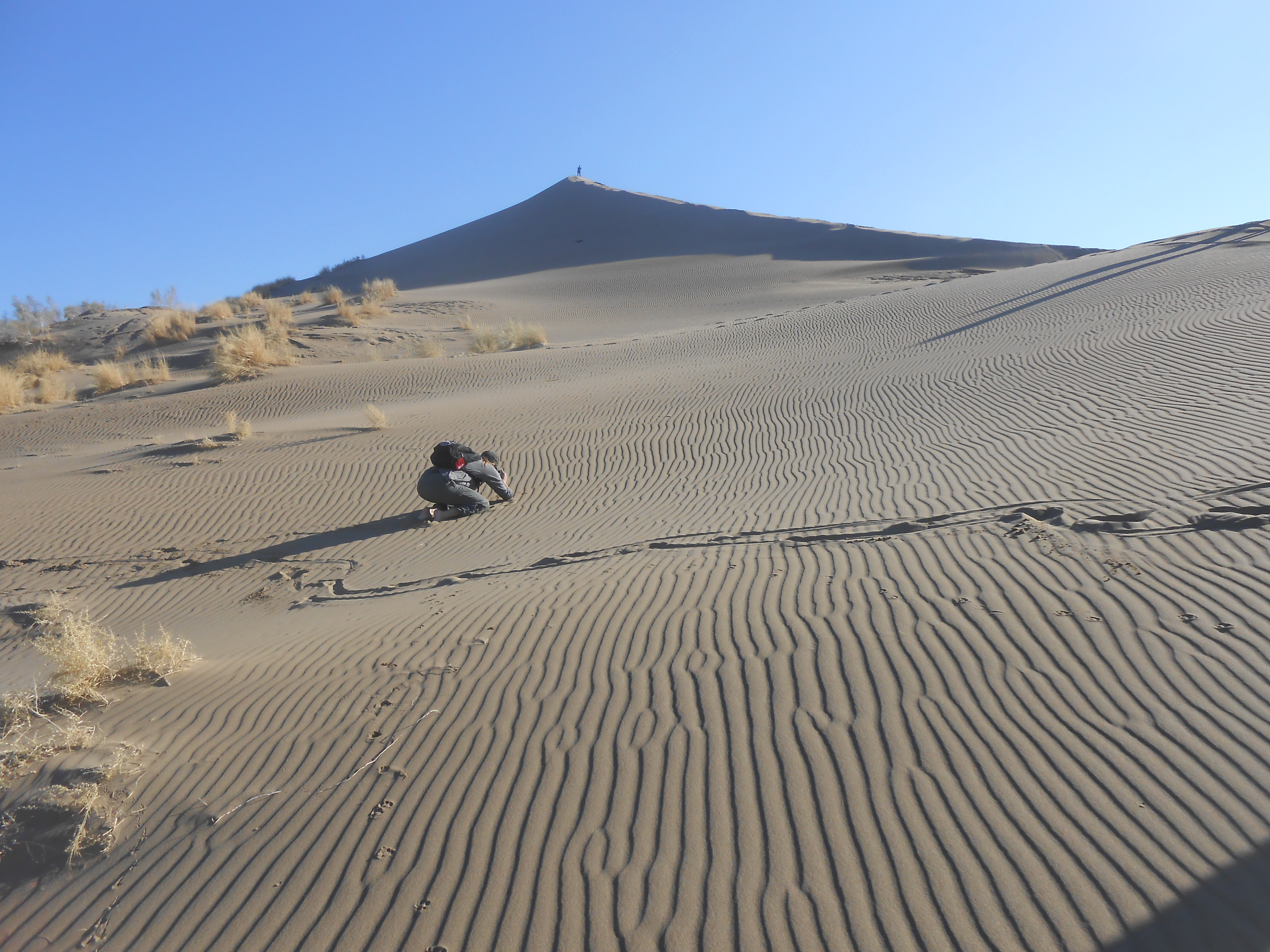
Varzaneh desert east of Isfahan

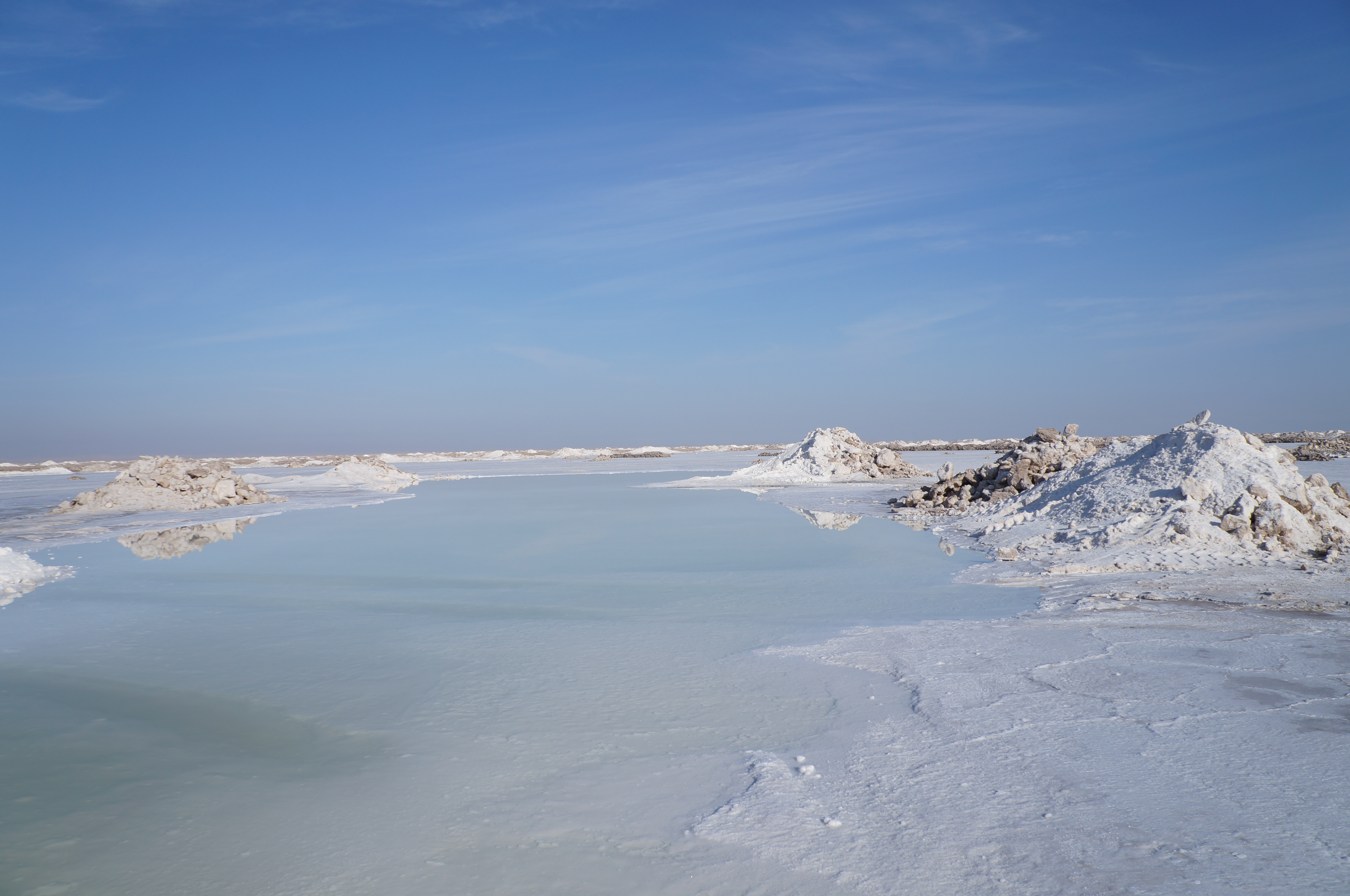
Salt lake near Varzaneh, Isfahan province

== Wetland City ==
In 2022, the city of Varzaneh was selected as the first wetland city in Iran at the 14th Ramsar Convention. This event occurred after several years of studying the city and the dimensions of environmental protection carried out by various groups and the municipality. In Geneva, Switzerland, the then mayor, Dr. Hamed Akhgar, received this certificate. The issue of the Gavkhuni International Wetland, which is the most important wetland in the central plateau of Iran, has been considered as a fundamental strategy for wetland protection.
