= Sharifabad, Urmia =

Sharifabad شريفاباد
- Village
- Location within Iran
- Coordinates: 37°59′05″N 44°56′29″E
- Country: Iran
- Province: West Azerbaijan
- County: Urmia
- Bakhsh: Anzal
- Rural District: Anzal-e Jonubi

Population (2006)
  - Total: 131
- Time zone: UTC+3:30 (IRST)
  - Summer (DST): UTC+4:30 (IRDT)

Sharifabad (Persian: شريفاباد, also Romanized as Sharīfābād) is a village in Anzal-e Jonubi Rural District, Anzal District, Urmia County, West Azerbaijan Province, Iran. At the 2006 census, its population was 131, in 27 families.
