= Abu ol Khiri =

Abu ol Khiri ابوالخيري
- Village
- Interactive map of Abu ol Khiri
- Coordinates: 33°42′N 59°11′E
- Country: Iran
- Province: South Khorasan
- County: Qaen
- Bakhsh: Central
- Rural District: Qaen

Population (2006)
  - Total: 38
- Time zone: UTC+3:30 (IRST)
  - Summer (DST): UTC+4:30 (IRDT)

Abu ol Khiri (Persian: ابوالخيري, also Romanized as Ābū ol Khīrī) is a village in Qaen Rural District, in the Central District of Qaen County, South Khorasan Province, Iran. At the 2006 census, its population was 38, in 11 families.
