= Sharifabad, South Khorasan =

Sharifabad شريف اباد
- Village
- Location within Iran
- Coordinates: 32°58′01″N 59°17′05″E
- Country: Iran
- Province: South Khorasan
- County: Birjand
- Bakhsh: Central
- Rural District: Alqurat

Population (2006)
  - Total: 149
- Time zone: UTC+3:30 (IRST)
  - Summer (DST): UTC+4:30 (IRDT)

Sharifabad (Persian: شريف اباد, also Romanized as Sharīfābād; also known as Eshkambarābād, Shekambarābād, Ishtambarābād, and Shekambor Abad) is a village in Alqurat Rural District, in the Central District of Birjand County, South Khorasan Province, Iran. At the 2006 census, its population was 149, in 42 families.
