= Sharafabad-e Pain =

Sharafabad-e Pain شرف ابادپايين
- Village
- Location within Iran
- Coordinates: 34°07′21″N 47°33′05″E
- Country: Iran
- Province: Lorestan
- County: Delfan
- Bakhsh: Kakavand
- Rural District: Kakavand-e Gharbi

Population (2006)
  - Total: 53
- Time zone: UTC+3:30 (IRST)
  - Summer (DST): UTC+4:30 (IRDT)

Sharafabad-e Pain (Persian: شرف ابادپايين, also Romanized as Sharafābād-e Pā'īn) is a village in Kakavand-e Gharbi Rural District, Kakavand District, Delfan County, Lorestan Province, Iran. As of the 2006 census, its population was 53, in 8 families.
