= Sharifabad, Khoy =

Sharifabad شريفاباد
- Village
- Location within Iran
- Coordinates: 38°31′56″N 44°30′39″E
- Country: Iran
- Province: West Azerbaijan
- County: Khoy
- Bakhsh: Qatur
- Rural District: Qatur

Population (2006)
  - Total: 70
- Time zone: UTC+3:30 (IRST)
  - Summer (DST): UTC+4:30 (IRDT)

Sharifabad (Persian: شريفاباد, also Romanized as Sharīfābād) is a village in Qatur Rural District, Qatur District, Khoy County, West Azerbaijan Province, Iran. At the 2006 census, its population was 70, in 17 families.
