= Sharifabad, Lorestan =

Sharifabad شريف آباد
- Village
- Location within Iran
- Coordinates: 33°26′08″N 49°35′30″E
- Country: Iran
- Province: Lorestan
- County: Aligudarz
- Bakhsh: Central
- Rural District: Pachehlak-e Sharqi

Population (2006)
  - Total: 65
- Time zone: UTC+3:30 (IRST)
  - Summer (DST): UTC+4:30 (IRDT)

Sharifabad (Persian: شريف آباد, also Romanized as Sharīfābād and Sharafābād) is a village in Pachehlak-e Sharqi Rural District, in the Central District of Aligudarz County, Lorestan Province, Iran. At the 2006 census, its population was 65, in 15 families.
