= Sharafabad, Yazd =

Sharafabad شرف اباد
- Village
- Location within Iran
- Coordinates: 32°05′06″N 54°08′28″E
- Country: Iran
- Province: Yazd
- County: Saduq
- Bakhsh: Central
- Rural District: Rostaq

Population (2006)
  - Total: 736
- Time zone: UTC+3:30 (IRST)
  - Summer (DST): UTC+4:30 (IRDT)

Sharafabad (Persian: شرف اباد, also Romanized as Sharafābād; also known as Sharīfābād) is a village in Rostaq Rural District, in the Central District of Saduq County, Yazd Province, Iran. At the 2006 census, its population was 736, in 218 families.
