= Sharifabad Rural District (Rafsanjan County) =

Rural district in Kerman province, Iran

Sharifabad Rural District Persian: دهستان شريف آباد
- Rural District
- Location within Iran
- Coordinates: 30°36′02″N 55°35′45″E
- Country: Iran
- Province: Kerman
- County: Rafsanjan
- District: Koshkuiyeh
- Capital: Sharifabad

Population (2016)
  - Total: 7,100
- Time zone: UTC+3:30 (IRST)

Sharifabad Rural District (Persian: دهستان شريف آباد) is in Koshkuiyeh District of Rafsanjan County, Kerman province, Iran. Its capital is the village of Sharifabad.

== Demographics ==
=== Population ===
At the time of the 2006 National Census, the rural district's population was 8,529 in 2,045 households. There were 7,640 inhabitants in 2,007 households at the following census of 2011. The 2016 census measured the population of the rural district as 7,100 in 2,045 households. The most populous of its 48 villages was Sharifabad, with 2,799 people.
