= Rudasht-e Sharqi Rural District =

Rural district in Isfahan province, Iran

Rudasht-e Sharqi Rural District Persian: دهستان رودشت شرقي
- Rural District
- Location within Iran
- Coordinates: 32°27′N 52°29′E
- Country: Iran
- Province: Isfahan
- County: Varzaneh
- District: Rudasht
- Established: 1991
- Capital: Kafran

Population (2016)
  - Total: 9,074
- Time zone: UTC+3:30 (IRST)

Rudasht-e Sharqi Rural District (Persian: دهستان رودشت شرقي) is in Rudasht District of Varzaneh County, Isfahan province, Iran. Its capital is the village of Kafran.

== Demographics ==
=== Population ===
At the time of the 2006 National Census, the rural district's population (as a part of Bon Rud District (Note: Renamed the Central District of Varzaneh County) in Isfahan County) was 7,946 in 2,193 households. There were 8,555 inhabitants in 2,620 households at the following census of 2011. The 2016 census measured the population of the rural district as 9,074 in 2,925 households. The most populous of its 16 villages was Kafran, with 2,679 people.

In 2021, the district was separated from the county in the establishment of Varzaneh County and renamed the Central District. The rural district was transferred to the new Rudasht District.

=== Other villages in the rural district ===
- Farfan
- Rangi Deh
