= Rudasht District (Varzaneh County) =

District in Isfahan province, Iran

Rudasht District Persian: بخش رودشت
- District
- Location within Iran
- Coordinates: 32°16′N 52°41′E
- Country: Iran
- Province: Isfahan
- County: Varzaneh
- Established: 2021
- Capital: Kafran
- Time zone: UTC+3:30 (IRST)

Rudasht District (Persian: بخش رودشت) is in Varzaneh County, Isfahan province, Iran. Its capital is the village of Kafran, whose population at the time of the 2016 National Census was 2,679 in 887 households.

== History ==
In 2021, Bon Rud District (Note: Renamed the Central District of Varzaneh County) was separated from Isfahan County in the establishment of Varzaneh County and renamed the Central District. The new county was divided into two districts of two rural districts each, with Varzaneh as its capital and only city at the time.

== Demographics ==
=== Administrative divisions ===
Rudasht District
Administrative Divisions
Kafrud RD
Rudasht-e Sharqi RD
RD: Rural District
