= Gavkhuni-ye Shomali Rural District =

Rural district in Isfahan province, Iran

Gavkhuni-ye Shomali Rural District Persian: دهستان گاوخونی شمالی
- Rural District
- Location within Iran
- Coordinates: 32°25′N 52°46′E
- Country: Iran
- Province: Isfahan
- County: Varzaneh
- District: Central
- Established: 1987
- Capital: Qurtan

Population (2016)
  - Total: 7,930
- Time zone: UTC+3:30 (IRST)

Gavkhuni-ye Shomali Rural District (Persian: دهستان گاوخونی شمالی) (Note: Formerly Gavkhuni Rural District (دهستان گاوخونی)) is in the Central District (Note: Formerly Bon Rud District of Isfahan County) of Varzaneh County, Isfahan province, Iran. Its capital is the village of Qurtan.

== Demographics ==
=== Population ===
At the time of the 2006 National Census, the rural district's population (as Gavkhuni Rural District (Note: Renamed Gavkhuni-ye Shomali Rural District) of Bon Rud District (Note: Renamed the Central District of Varzaneh County) in Isfahan County) was 6,833 in 1,760 households. There were 7,208 inhabitants in 2,074 households at the following census of 2011. The 2016 census measured the population of the rural district as 7,930 in 2,400 households. The most populous of its 24 villages was Oshkohran (now in Gavkhuni-ye Jonubi Rural District), with 1,463 people.

In 2021, the district was separated from the county in the establishment of Varzaneh County and renamed the Central District. The rural district was renamed Gavkhuni-ye Shomali Rural District.
