= Varzaneh County =

County in Isfahan province, Iran

Varzaneh County Persian: شهرستان ورزنه
- County
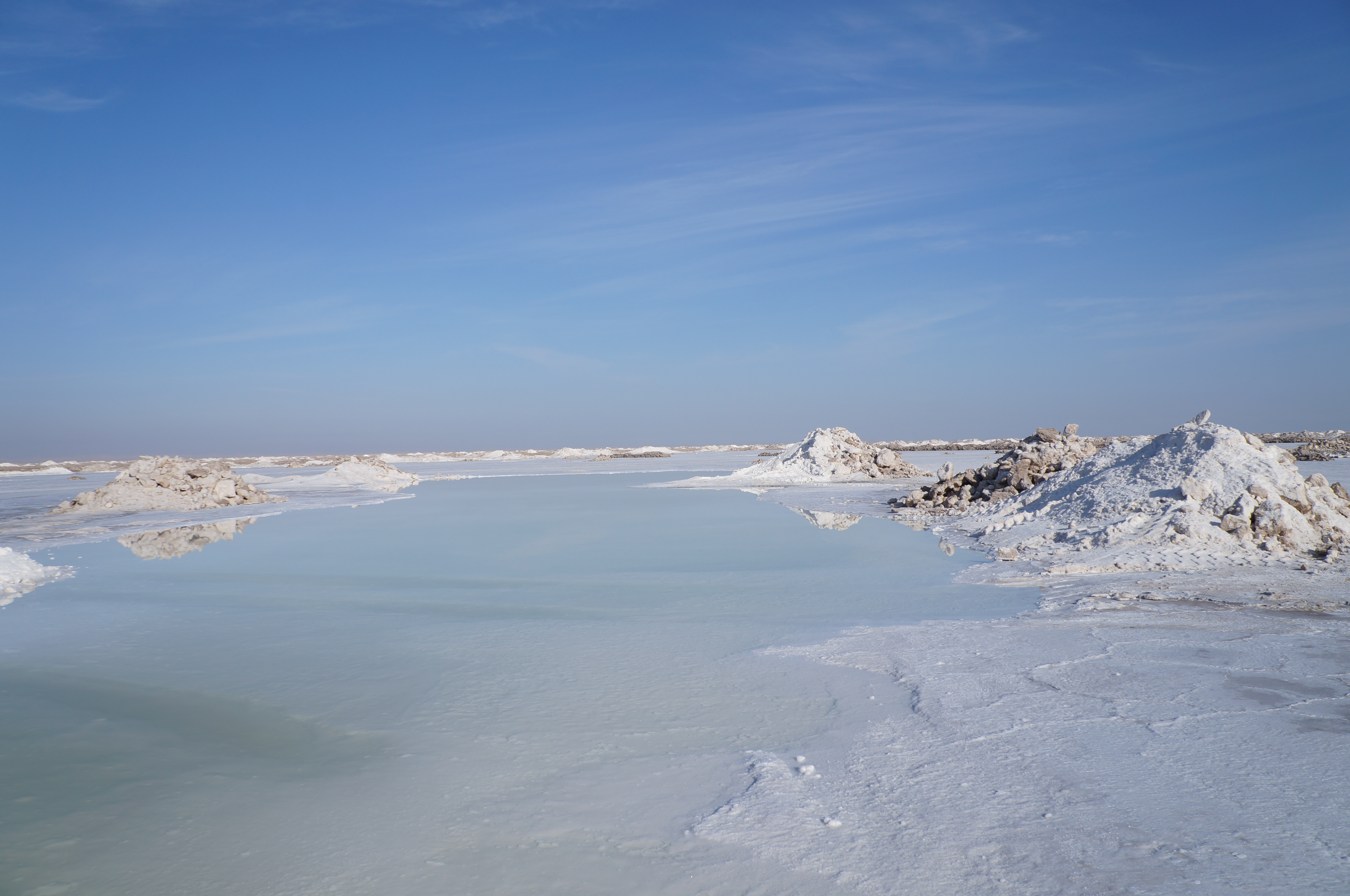
- Salt Lake in Khara near the city of Varzaneh

- Location of Varzaneh County in Isfahan province (center right, green)

- Location of Isfahan province in Iran
- Coordinates: 32°18′N 52°45′E
- Country: Iran
- Province: Isfahan
- Established: 2021
- Capital: Varzaneh
- Districts: Central, Rudasht
- Time zone: UTC+3:30 (IRST)

Varzaneh County (Persian: شهرستان ورزنه) is in Isfahan province, Iran. Its capital is the city of Varzaneh, whose population at the time of the 2016 National Census was 12,714 in 3,900 households.

== History ==
In 2021, Bon Rud District (Note: Renamed the Central District of Varzaneh County) was separated from Isfahan County in the establishment of Varzaneh County and renamed the Central District. The county was divided into two districts of two rural districts each, with Varzaneh as its capital and only city at the time.

== Demographics ==
=== Administrative divisions ===
Varzaneh County's administrative structure is shown in the following table.

Varzaneh County
Administrative Divisions
Central District (Note: Formerly Bon Rud District of Isfahan County)
Gavkhuni-ye Jonubi RD
Gavkhuni-ye Shomali RD (Note: Formerly Gavkhuni Rural District)
Varzaneh (city)
Rudasht District
Kafrud RD
Rudasht-e Sharqi RD
RD = Rural District

== See also ==
Media related to Varzaneh County at Wikimedia Commons
