= Central District (Varzaneh County) =

District in Isfahan province, Iran

Central District (Varzaneh County) Persian: بخش مرکزی شهرستان ورزنه
- District
- Location within Iran
- Coordinates: 32°25′N 52°46′E
- Country: Iran
- Province: Isfahan
- County: Varzaneh
- Established: 1993
- Capital: Varzaneh

Population (2016)
  - Total: 29,718 (Note: As Bon Rud District of Isfahan County)
- Time zone: UTC+3:30 (IRST)

The Central District of Varzaneh County (Persian: بخش مرکزی شهرستان ورزنه) (Note: Formerly Bon Rud District (بخش بن‌رود) of Isfahan County) is in Isfahan province, Iran. Its capital is the city of Varzaneh.

== History ==
In 2021, Bon Rud District (Note: Renamed the Central District of Varzaneh County) was separated from Isfahan County in the establishment of Varzaneh County and renamed the Central District. The new county was divided into two districts of two rural districts each, with Varzaneh as its capital and only city at the time.

== Demographics ==
=== Population ===
At the time of the 2006 National Census, the district's population (as Bon Rud District of Isfahan County) was 26,285 in 6,934 households. The following census in 2011 counted 27,687 people in 8,137 households. The 2016 census measured the population of the district as 29,718 inhabitants in 9,225 households.

=== Administrative divisions ===
Central District (Varzaneh County) (Note: As Bon Rud District of Isfahan County at the 2006, 2011, and 2016 censuses)
Administrative Divisions	2006	2011	2016
Gavkhuni-ye Jonubi RD (Note: Established after the 2016 census)			
Gavkhuni-ye Shomali RD (Note: Formerly Gavkhuni Rural District)	6,833	7,208	7,930
Rudasht-e Sharqi RD (Note: Transferred to Rudasht District)	7,946	8,555	9,074
Varzaneh (city)	11,506	11,924	12,714
Total	26,285	27,687	29,718
RD = Rural District
