= Ezhiyeh District =

District in Isfahan province, Iran

Ezhiyeh District Persian: بخش اژیه
- District
- Location within Iran
- Coordinates: 32°26′N 52°23′E
- Country: Iran
- Province: Isfahan
- County: Harand
- Established: 2021
- Capital: Ezhiyeh
- Time zone: UTC+3:30 (IRST)

Ezhiyeh District (Persian: بخش اژیه) is in Harand County, Isfahan province, Iran. Its capital is the city of Ezhiyeh, whose population at the time of the 2016 National Census was 3,156 in 1,081 households.

== History ==
In 2021, Jolgeh District (Note: Renamed the Central District of Harand County) was separated from Isfahan County in the establishment of Harand County and renamed the Central District. The new county was divided into two districts of two rural districts each, with the city of Harand as its capital.

== Demographics ==
=== Administrative divisions ===
Ezhiyeh District
Administrative Divisions
Kelishad RD
Rudasht RD
Ezhiyeh (city)
RD = Rural District
