= Emamzadeh Abdol Aziz Rural District =

Rural district in Isfahan province, Iran

Emamzadeh Abdol Aziz Rural District Persian: دهستان امامزاده عبدالعزیز
- Rural District
- Location within Iran
- Coordinates: 32°33′N 52°16′E
- Country: Iran
- Province: Isfahan
- County: Harand
- District: Central
- Established: 1987
- Capital: Emamzadeh Abdol Aziz

Population (2016)
  - Total: 9,712
- Time zone: UTC+3:30 (IRST)

Emamzadeh Abdol Aziz Rural District (Persian: دهستان امامزاده عبدالعزیز) is in the Central District (Note: Formerly Jolgeh District of Isfahan County) of Harand County, Isfahan province, Iran. Its capital is the village of Emamzadeh Abdol Aziz.

== Demographics ==
=== Population ===
At the time of the 2006 National Census, the rural district's population (as a part of Jolgeh District (Note: Renamed the Central District of Harand County) in Isfahan County) was 9,019 in 2,356 households. There were 9,377 inhabitants in 2,834 households at the following census of 2011. The 2016 census measured the population of the rural district as 9,712 in 3,143 households. The most populous of its 34 villages was Emamzadeh Abdol Aziz, with 2,943 people.

In 2021, the district was separated from the county in the establishment of Harand County and renamed the Central District.

=== Other villages in the rural district ===
- Gishi
- Hashemabad
- Kelil
- Qaleh-ye Bala
- Qomshan
