= Harand County =

County in Isfahan province, Iran

Harand County Persian: شهرستان هرند
- County
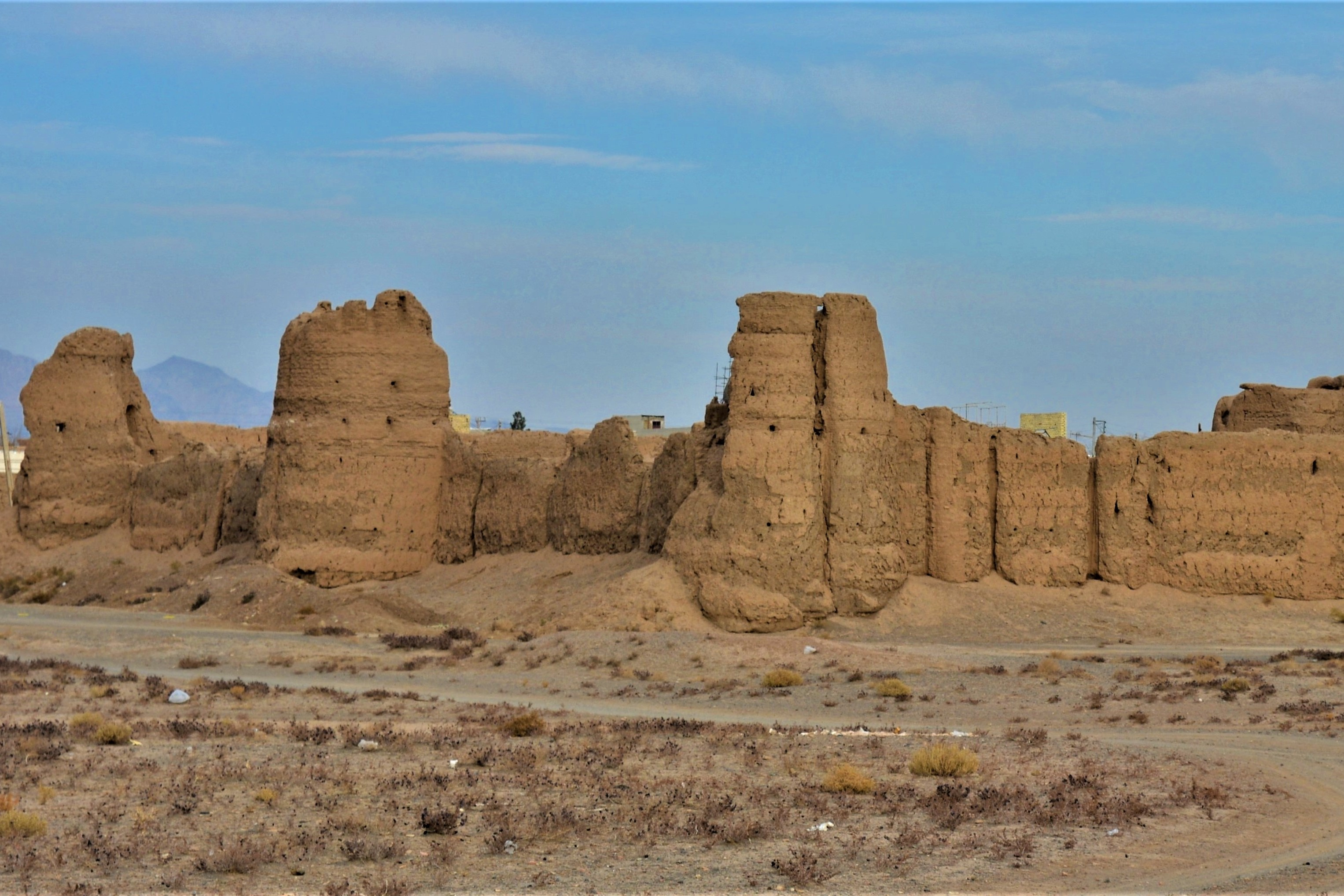
- Atashgah Castle

- Location of Harand County in Isfahan province (center right, yellow)

- Location of Isfahan province in Iran
- Coordinates: 32°27′N 52°23′E
- Country: Iran
- Province: Isfahan
- Established: 2021
- Capital: Harand
- Districts: Central, Ezhiyeh
- Time zone: UTC+3:30 (IRST)

Harand County (Persian: شهرستان هرند) is in Isfahan province, Iran. Its capital is the city of Harand, whose population at the time of the 2016 National Census was 7,829 in 2,478 households.

== History ==
In 2021, Jolgeh District (Note: Renamed the Central District of Harand County) was separated from Isfahan County in the establishment of Harand County and renamed the Central District. The new county was divided into two districts of two rural districts each, with Harand as its capital.

== Demographics ==
=== Administrative divisions ===
Harand County's administrative structure is shown in the following table.

Harand County
Administrative Divisions
Central District (Note: Formerly Jolgeh District of Isfahan County)
Emamzadeh Abdol Aziz RD
Hashemabad RD
Harand (city)
Ezhiyeh District
Kelishad RD
Rudasht RD
Ezhiyeh (city)
RD = Rural District

== See also ==
Media related to Harand County at Wikimedia Commons
