= Central District (Harand County) =

District in Isfahan province, Iran

Central District (Harand County) Persian: بخش مرکزی شهرستان هرند
- District
- Location within Iran
- Coordinates: 32°34′N 52°22′E
- Country: Iran
- Province: Isfahan
- County: Harand
- Established: 1993
- Capital: Harand

Population (2016)
  - Total: 21,257 (Note: As Jolgeh District of Isfahan County)
- Time zone: UTC+3:30 (IRST)

The Central District of Harand County (Persian: بخش مرکزی شهرستان هرند) (Note: Formerly Jolgeh District (بخش جلگه) of Isfahan County) is in Isfahan province, Iran. Its capital is the city of Harand.

== History ==
In 2021, Jolgeh District (Note: Renamed the Central District of Harand County) was separated from Isfahan County in the establishment of Harand County and renamed the Central District. The new county was divided into two districts of two rural districts each, with Harand as its capital.

== Demographics ==
=== Population ===
At the time of the 2006 National Census, the district's population, as Jolgeh District of Isfahan County, was 19,527 in 5,313 households. The following census in 2011 counted 20,547 people in 6,245 households. The 2016 census measured the population of the district as 21,257 inhabitants in 6,871 households.

=== Administrative divisions ===
Central District (Harand County) (Note: As Jolgeh District of Isfahan County at the 2006, 2011, and 2016 censuses)
Administrative Divisions	2006	2011	2016
Emamzadeh Abdol Aziz RD	9,019	9,377	9,712
Hashemabad RD (Note: Established after the 2016 census)			
Rudasht RD (Note: Transferred to Ezhiyeh District after the 2016 census)	586	581	560
Ezhiyeh (city)	3,309	3,481	3,156
Harand (city)	6,613	7,108	7,829
Total	19,527	20,547	21,257
RD = Rural District
