= Arusan-e Golestan =

Village in Isfahan province, Iran

Arusan-e Golestan Persian: عروسان گلستان
- Village
- Location within Iran
- Coordinates: 33°28′31″N 55°01′14″E
- Country: Iran
- Province: Isfahan
- County: Khur and Biabanak
- District: Central
- Rural District: Nakhlestan

Population (2016)
  - Total: 165
- Time zone: UTC+3:30 (IRST)

Arusan-e Golestan (Persian: عروسان گلستان) (Note: Also romanized as ‘Arūsān-e Golestān; also known as Arasūn and ‘Arūsān) is a village in Nakhlestan Rural District of the Central District in Khur and Biabanak County, Isfahan province, Iran.

== Demographics ==
=== Population ===
At the time of the 2006 National Census, the village's population was 145 in 54 households, when it was in the former Khur and Biabanak District of Nain County. The following census in 2011 counted 124 people in 53 households, by which time the district had been separated from the county in the establishment of Khur and Biabanak County. The rural district was transferred to the new Central District. The 2016 census measured the population of the village as 165 people in 69 households.
