= Garmeh, Isfahan =

Village in Isfahan province, Iran

Garmeh Persian: گرمه
- Village
- Location within Iran
- Coordinates: 33°31′33″N 55°02′23″E
- Country: Iran
- Province: Isfahan
- County: Khur and Biabanak
- District: Central
- Rural District: Nakhlestan

Population (2016)
  - Total: 252
- Time zone: UTC+3:30 (IRST)

Garmeh (Persian: گرمه) (Note: Also known as Garmāb) is a village in Nakhlestan Rural District of the Central District in Khur and Biabanak County, Isfahan province, Iran.

== Demographics ==
=== Language ===
The native language of Garmeh is Garmei. Together with Khuri, Farvi, and Iraji, it is classified as a variety of Baiabanaki, which is a distinct subgroup of Western Iranian languages.

=== Population ===
At the time of the 2006 National Census, the village's population was 244 in 69 households, when it was in the former Khur and Biabanak District of Nain County. The following census in 2011 counted 188 people in 71 households, by which time the district had been separated from the county in the establishment of Khur and Biabanak County. The rural district was transferred to the new Central District. The 2016 census measured the population of the village as 252 people in 100 households.
