= Al-e Davoud =

ʾAl-e Davoud (Persian: آل داوود), also known as Aledavood (Persian: آل داود), is an Iranian landowner family, originally from Khur and Biabanak County, where they owned large tracts of lands before the demolition of share cropping system during the White Revolution.

== History ==
The family descends from Hāj Seīd Mīrzā Ghāzī (d.1875) a mystic man and a contemporary of Yaghma Jandaghi, the prominent poet of early 19th century Iran. There was a long conflict between devout and pious Ghāzī and the godless poet, and each lampooned the other in many poems and letters. To put an end to the quarrel, Fātīmeh, a grand daughter of Yaghma was married to Habīb-ollāh, the only son of Ghāzī. From this marriage three sons were born, two of them becoming well known poets and literary figures: Mīrzā Asadollah and Mīrzā Eghbāl. Mīrzā Eghbāl was more accomplished in his literature career than his brother, but except for a scant number of poems, most of his works are lost. Mīrzā Asadollah was a man of letters and talented in calligraphy, while his outstanding gift was improvising poetry. He received the honorable title of Montākhab-ol-Sādāt from a Qajar King. He served the governors of Khur and Biabanak as their secretary for many years, and died in 1932 in Biabanak. He married Fātīmeh Yaghmā'ī a grand daughter of Ahmad Safā'ī son of Yaghma. She gave birth to ten children, the most notable of them are Habīb Yaghmā'ī (1901-1984) and Abdol-Hossaīn ʾAl-e Dāvood (1896-1956).

Habīb Yaghmā'ī was a poet, writer and journalist and founder and editor of Yaghma journal. Abdol-Hossaīn was an accomplished calligrapher and poet under the pen name of Adīb.
