= Mesr =

Village in Isfahan province, Iran

Mesr مصر
- Village
- Location within Iran
- Coordinates: 34°04′00″N 54°47′43″E
- Country: Iran
- Province: Isfahan
- County: Khur and Biabanak
- District: Central
- Rural District: Jandaq

Population (2016)
  - Total: 133
- Time zone: UTC+3:30 (IRST)

Mesr (Persian: مصر) (Note: Also romanized as Maşr and Meşr) is a village in Jandaq Rural District of the Central District in Khur and Biabanak County, Isfahan province, Iran.

== Demographics ==
=== Population ===
At the time of the 2006 National Census, the village's population was 183 in 41 households, when it was in the former Khur and Biabanak District of Nain County. The following census in 2011 counted 137 people in 31 households, by which time the district had been separated from the county in the establishment of Khur and Biabanak County. The rural district was transferred to the new Central District. The 2016 census measured the population of the village as 133 people in 39 households, the most populous in its rural district.
