= Jafarabad, Khur and Biabanak =

Village in Isfahan province, Iran

Jafarabad Persian: جعفراباد
- Village
- Location within Iran
- Coordinates: 33°47′24″N 54°54′52″E
- Country: Iran
- Province: Isfahan
- County: Khur and Biabanak
- District: Central
- Rural District: Biabanak

Population (2016)
  - Total: 257
- Time zone: UTC+3:30 (IRST)

Jafarabad (Persian: جعفراباد) (Note: Also romanized as Ja‘farābād) is a village in Biabanak Rural District of the Central District in Khur and Biabanak County, Isfahan province, Iran.

== Demographics ==
=== Population ===
At the time of the 2006 National Census, the village's population was 295 in 73 households, when it was in the former Khur and Biabanak District of Nain County. The following census in 2011 counted 255 people in 78 households, by which time the district had been separated from the county in the establishment of Khur and Biabanak County. The rural district was transferred to the new Central District. The 2016 census measured the population of the village as 257 people in 77 households.
