= Khorramdasht, Khur and Biabanak =

Village in Isfahan province, Iran

Khorramdasht Persian: خرمدشت
- Village
- Location within Iran
- Coordinates: 33°47′30″N 54°55′56″E
- Country: Iran
- Province: Isfahan
- County: Khur and Biabanak
- District: Central
- Rural District: Biabanak

Population (2016)
  - Total: 15
- Time zone: UTC+3:30 (IRST)

Khorramdasht (Persian: خرمدشت) is a village in Biabanak Rural District of the Central District in Khur and Biabanak County, Isfahan province, Iran.

== Demographics ==
=== Population ===
At the time of the 2006 National Census, the village's population was below the reporting threshold, when it was in the former Khur and Biabanak District of Nain County. The following census in 2011 again counted a population below the reporting threshold, by which time the district had been separated from the county in the establishment of Khur and Biabanak County. The rural district was transferred to the new Central District. The 2016 census measured the population of the village as 15 people in six households.
