= Mehrjan =

Village in Isfahan province, Iran

Mehrjan Persian: مهرجان
- Village
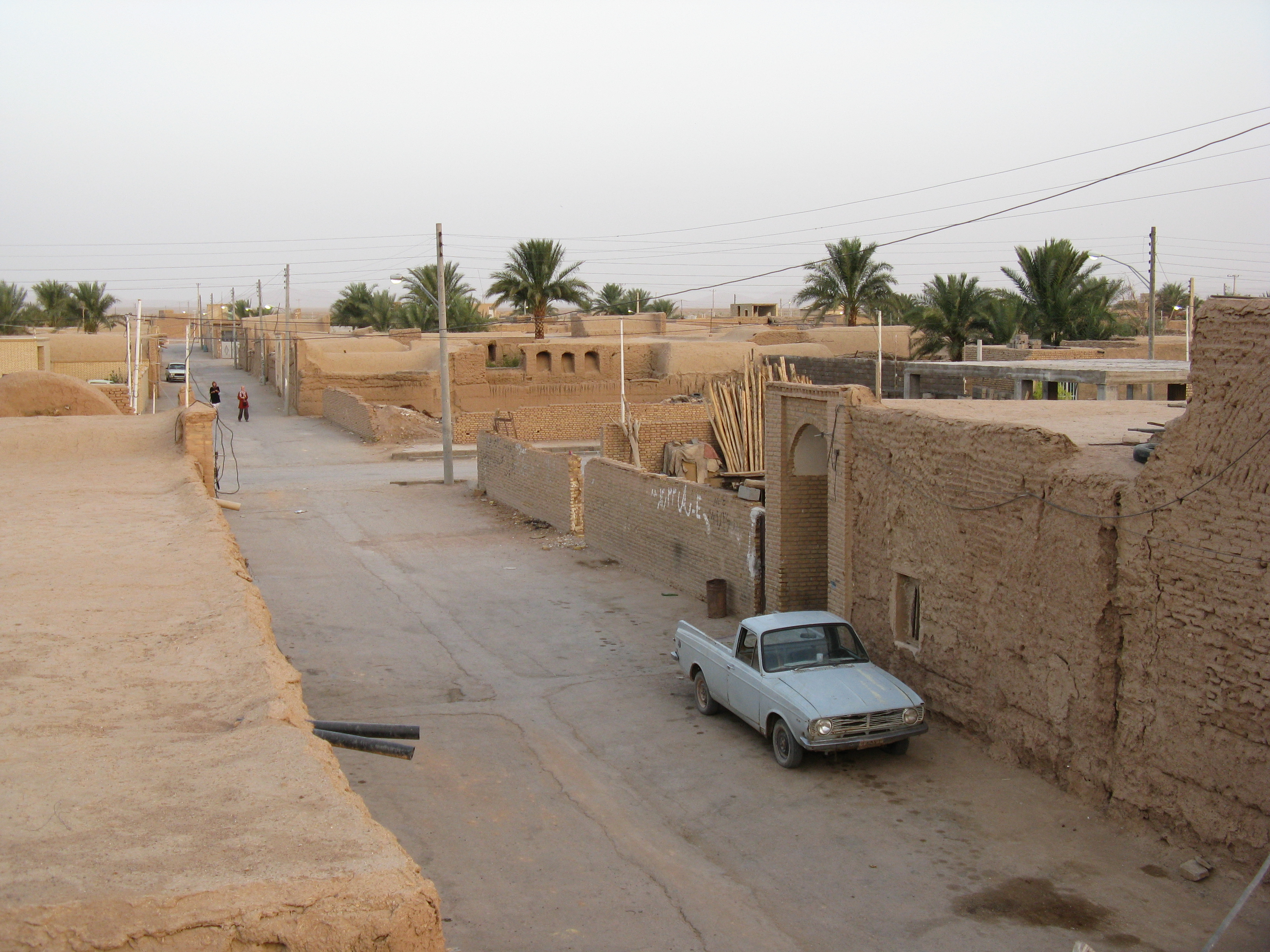
- Mehrjan

- Location within Iran
- Coordinates: 33°29′55″N 55°09′29″E
- Country: Iran
- Province: Isfahan
- County: Khur and Biabanak
- District: Central
- Rural District: Nakhlestan

Population (2016)
  - Total: 624
- Time zone: UTC+3:30 (IRST)

Mehrjan (Persian: مهرجان) (Note: Also romanized as Mehr Jān and Mehrjān; also known as Marjān, Mehrījān, and Mihrjān) is a village in, and the capital of, Nakhlestan Rural District in the Central District of Khur and Biabanak County, Isfahan, Iran.

== Demographics ==
=== Population ===
At the 2006 National Census, its population was 687 in 202 households, when it was in the former Khur and Biabanak District of Nain County. The 2011 census counted 513 people in 167 households, by which time the district had been separated from the county in the establishment of Khur and Biabanak County. The rural district was transferred to the new Central District. The 2016 census recorded a population of 624 people in 224 households.
