= Iraj, Isfahan =

Village in Isfahan province, Iran

Iraj Persian: ايراج
- Village
- Location within Iran
- Coordinates: 33°27′38″N 54°52′11″E
- Country: Iran
- Province: Isfahan
- County: Khur and Biabanak
- District: Central
- Rural District: Nakhlestan

Population (2016)
  - Total: 655
- Time zone: UTC+3:30 (IRST)

Iraj (Persian: ايراج) (Note: Also romanized as Īrāj; also known as Iragh and ‘Irāq) is a village in Nakhlestan Rural District of the Central District in Khur and Biabanak County, Isfahan province, Iran.

== Demographics ==
=== Population ===
At the time of the 2006 National Census, the village's population was 362 in 138 households, when it was in the former Khur and Biabanak District of Nain County. The following census in 2011 counted 301 people in 123 households, by which time the district had been separated from the county in the establishment of Khur and Biabanak County. The rural district was transferred to the new Central District. The 2016 census measured the population of the village as 655 people in 234 households, the most populous in its rural district.
