= Khonj, Isfahan =

Village in Isfahan province, Iran

Khonj Persian: خنج
- Village
- Location within Iran
- Coordinates: 33°22′36″N 54°57′45″E
- Country: Iran
- Province: Isfahan
- County: Khur and Biabanak
- District: Central
- Rural District: Nakhlestan

Population (2016)
  - Total: 80
- Time zone: UTC+3:30 (IRST)

Khonj (Persian: خنج) (Note: Also romanized as Khanj; also known as Kang, Kang-e Gorg, and Kangh) is a village in Nakhlestan Rural District of the Central District in Khur and Biabanak County, Isfahan province, Iran.

== Demographics ==
=== Population ===
At the time of the 2006 National Census, the village's population was 30 in 12 households, when it was in the former Khur and Biabanak District of Nain County. The following census in 2011 counted 22 people in 12 households, by which time the district had been separated from the county in the establishment of Khur and Biabanak County. The rural district was transferred to the new Central District. The 2016 census measured the population of the village as 80 people in 28 households.
