= Chah Malek =

Village in Isfahan province, Iran

Chah Malek Persian: چاه ملک
- Village
- Location within Iran
- Coordinates: 33°45′10″N 54°42′02″E
- Country: Iran
- Province: Isfahan
- County: Khur and Biabanak
- District: Central
- Rural District: Biabanak

Population (2016)
  - Total: 1,797
- Time zone: UTC+3:30 (IRST)

Chah Malek (Persian: چاه ملک) (Note: Also romanized as Chāh Malek) is a village in Biabanak Rural District of the Central District in Khur and Biabanak County, Isfahan province, Iran.

== Demographics ==
=== Population ===
At the time of the 2006 National Census, the village's population was 1,302 in 370 households, when it was in the former Khur and Biabanak District of Nain County. The following census in 2011 counted 1,445 people in 447 households, by which time the district had been separated from the county in the establishment of Khur and Biabanak County. The rural district was transferred to the new Central District. The 2016 census measured the population of the village as 1,797 people in 564 households, the most populous in its rural district.
