= Haftuman =

Village in Isfahan province, Iran

Haftuman Persian: هفتومان
- Village
- Location within Iran
- Coordinates: 33°31′12″N 54°45′21″E
- Country: Iran
- Province: Isfahan
- County: Khur and Biabanak
- District: Central
- Rural District: Nakhlestan

Population (2016)
  - Total: 137
- Time zone: UTC+3:30 (IRST)

Haftuman (Persian: هفتومان) (Note: Also romanized as Haftowman and Haftūmān; also known as Haft Tūmān) is a village in Nakhlestan Rural District of the Central District in Khur and Biabanak County, Isfahan province, Iran.

== Demographics ==
=== Population ===
At the time of the 2006 National Census, the village's population was 114 in 41 households, when it was in the former Khur and Biabanak District of Nain County. The following census in 2011 counted 103 people in 43 households, by which time the district had been separated from the county in the establishment of Khur and Biabanak County. The rural district was transferred to the new Central District. The 2016 census measured the population of the village as 137 people in 54 households.
