= Qaderabad, Khur and Biabanak =

Village in Isfahan province, Iran

Qaderabad Persian: قادراباد
- Village
- Location within Iran
- Country: Iran
- Province: Isfahan
- County: Khur and Biabanak
- District: Central
- Rural District: Biabanak

Population (2016)
  - Total: 75
- Time zone: UTC+3:30 (IRST)

Qaderabad (Persian: قادراباد) (Note: Also romanized as Qāderābād) is a village in Biabanak Rural District of the Central District in Khur and Biabanak County, Isfahan province, Iran.

== Demographics ==
=== Population ===
At the time of the 2006 National Census, the village's population was 86 in 22 households, when it was in the former Khur and Biabanak District of Nain County. The following census in 2011 counted 35 people in 21 households, by which time the district had been separated from the county in the establishment of Khur and Biabanak County. The rural district was transferred to the new Central District. The 2016 census measured the population of the village as 75 people in 29 households.
