= Jegarg =

Village in Isfahan province, Iran

Jegarg Persian: جگارگ
- Village
- Location within Iran
- Coordinates: 33°38′22″N 54°56′44″E
- Country: Iran
- Province: Isfahan
- County: Khur and Biabanak
- District: Central
- Rural District: Biabanak

Population (2016)
  - Total: 44
- Time zone: UTC+3:30 (IRST)

Jegarg (Persian: جگارگ) (Note: Also romanized as Jegārg) is a village in Biabanak Rural District of the Central District in Khur and Biabanak County, Isfahan province, Iran.

== Demographics ==
=== Population ===
At the time of the 2006 National Census, the village's population was 12 in four households, when it was in the former Khur and Biabanak District of Nain County. The following census in 2011 counted a population below the reporting threshold, by which time the district had been separated from the county in the establishment of Khur and Biabanak County. The rural district was transferred to the new Central District. The 2016 census measured the population of the village as 44 people in 17 households.
