= Baziab =

Village in Isfahan province, Iran

Baziab Persian: بازياب
- Village
- Location within Iran
- Coordinates: 33°27′03″N 54°41′44″E
- Country: Iran
- Province: Isfahan
- County: Khur and Biabanak
- District: Central
- Rural District: Nakhlestan

Population (2016)
  - Total: 72
- Time zone: UTC+3:30 (IRST)

Baziab (Persian: بازياب) (Note: Also romanized as Bāzīāb and Bāzyāb) is a village in Nakhlestan Rural District of the Central District in Khur and Biabanak County, Isfahan province, Iran.

== Demographics ==
=== Population ===
At the time of the 2006 National Census, the village's population was 43 in 16 households, when it was in the former Khur and Biabanak District of Nain County. The following census in 2011 counted 24 people in 13 households, by which time the district had been separated from the county in the establishment of Khur and Biabanak County. The rural district was transferred to the new Central District. The 2016 census measured the population of the village as 72 people in 27 households.
