= Biabanak =

Biabanak (Persian: بيابانك) may refer to:

- Biabanak Rural District
- Biabanak, alternate name of Bayazeh
