= Bayazeh =

Village in Isfahan province, Iran

Bayazeh Persian: بياضه
- Village
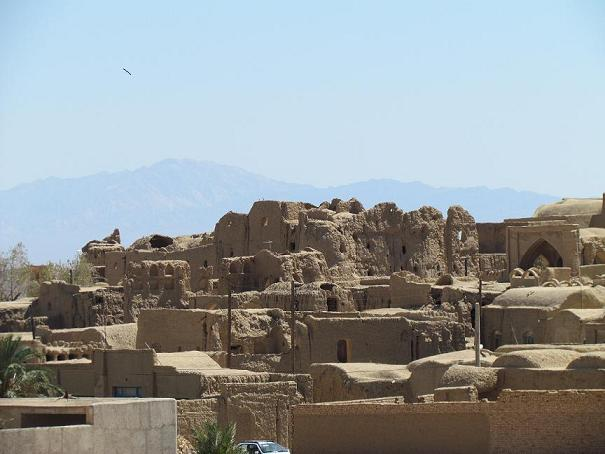
- The village of Bayazeh

- Location within Iran
- Coordinates: 33°20′02″N 55°06′13″E
- Country: Iran
- Province: Isfahan
- County: Khur and Biabanak
- District: Central
- Rural District: Nakhlestan

Population (2016)
  - Total: 221
- Time zone: UTC+3:30 (IRST)

Bayazeh (Persian: بياضه) (Note: Also romanized as Baiāzeh, Bayāẕeh, and Bayāzeh; also known as Bayāzīyeh and Bīabānāk) is a village in Nakhlestan Rural District of the Central District in Khur and Biabanak County, Isfahan province, Iran.

== Demographics ==
=== Population ===
At the time of the 2006 National Census, the village's population was 319 in 103 households, when it was in the former Khur and Biabanak District of Nain County. The following census in 2011 counted 245 people in 84 households, by which time the district had been separated from the county in the establishment of Khur and Biabanak County. The rural district was transferred to the new Central District. The 2016 census measured the population of the village as 221 people in 87 households.

== Overview ==
Bayazeh was founded more than 2,500 years ago. According to some reports, the population of this village had been around 5,000 people in the past. Bayazeh has been known as the cultural and scientific center of this part of the desert. Many greats and scientists have lived there.

Saghafi' (from Mukhtar Saghafi) have been the most famous family in this village.

An ancient old castle (remaining from the Sasanian empire or before), mosques, houses, covered narrow alleys, and a qanat, are all sites that attract tourists.
