= Yaghma Jandaqi =

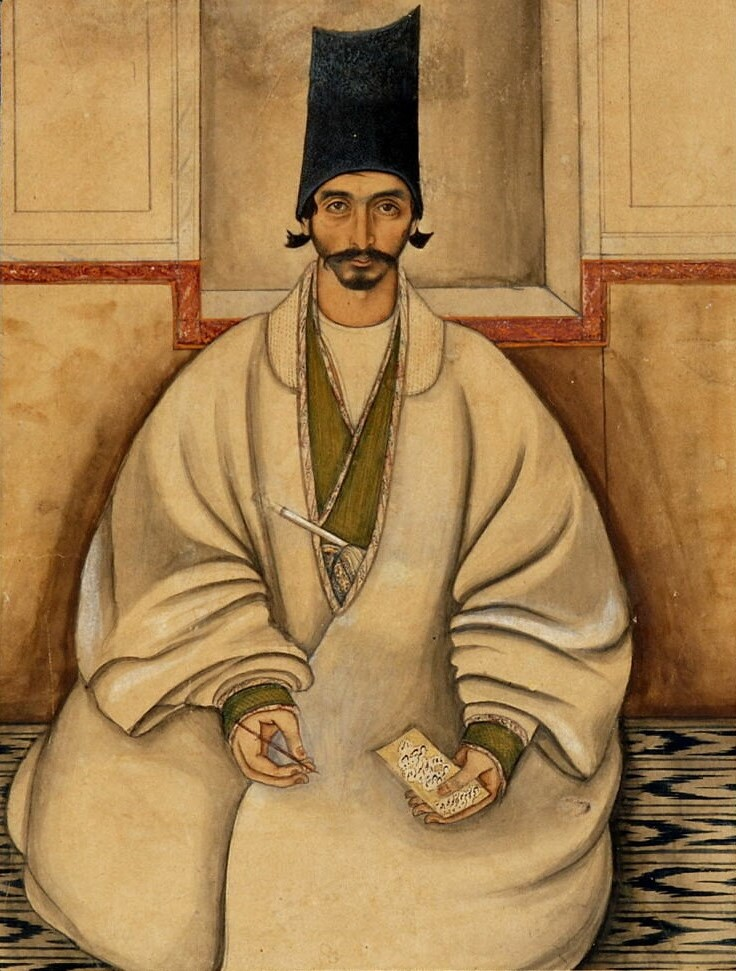
- Portrait of Yaghma Jandaqi, dated 1850–1860
- Born: 1782; Khur, Zand Iran
- Died: 12 November 1859 (aged 76–77); Khur, Qajar Iran
- Occupation: Poet
- Writing career
- Language: Persian; Khuri

Yaghma Jandaqi (Persian: یغمای جندقی; 1782–1859) was a poet in Qajar Iran, best known for his vulgar, defamatory, and sarcastic writings in Persian.

Yaghma was born in 1782 in Khur, a village situated near the town of Jandaq. The son of a certain Haj Ebrahim-Qoli, Yaghma was from a poor family, and thus by the age of six he was forced to work as a camel herder. An incident that had a major impact on Yaghma's life is noted in nearly all in the tazkarehs (biographical dictionaries) that mention him. During his youth, Yaghma entered under the service of Esmail Khan Arab Ameri, a powerful ruler in the area. He began as a carrier for Esmail Khan, handling letters and other tasks. He was eventually promoted as a scribe, after Esmail Khan had become aware of his writing capability. During this period, Yaghma adopted the name "Abolhasan" and began writing poetry under the pen name Majnun.

In 1801, Esmail Khan was defeated by a force led by Baqer Khan Enzani under the orders of the Iranian government. Baqer Khan Enzani subsequently gave the governorship of Damghan and Semnan to Zolfaqar Khan, who also received the personnel and resources of Esmail Khan. Following a brief military service, Yaghma was reinstated as a scribe by persuading Zolfaqar Khan's brother-in-law, Mohammad Ali Mazandarani. Yaghma's artistic and intellectual capability quickly drew the notice of Zolfaqar Khan, who appointed him as his personal secretary. Yaghma's rise in social status was greatly influenced by Zolfaqar Khan becoming an important commander for Fath-Ali Shah (r. 1797–1834), which he did due to his victory in the Khorasan war of 1817–1818.

Yaghma's status was envied by the governor Haj Aziz Semnani, who during his assignment to collect taxes in the region in the 1820s, fabricated a letter in Yaghma's name to defame Zolfaqar Khan. This resulted in Yaghma's arrest, which in turn led to his money being seized and his family being imprisoned. It was after his release that he adopted "Yaghma" ("booty", "despoliation") as his pen name. Intrigued by mystical concepts, Yaghma made trips around Iran. He may have also partly done it to stay away from his rivals.

During his travels, Yaghma briefly resided in the city of Qom, where he co-founded the literary association Anjoman-e Mofakeheh ("Facetiae Community") alongside Mohammad Ali Mazandarani and Mirza Mahdi Malek al-Kottab. Yaghma died on 12 November 1859 in Khur.

The British Iranologist Edward Granville Browne considered the French poet Paul Verlaine to be the European counterpart of Yaghma. The 20th-century Iranian poet Heydar Yaghma was a descendant of Yaghma.

Yaghma also composed poetry in his native Khuri, a non-Persian Western Iranian vernacular spoken in Khur and its surroundings.

== Sources ==
- Borjian, Habib (2018). "The Dialect of Khur". Studia Iranica: 3–98.
- Gheissari, Ali (2002). "Yag̲h̲māʾī". In Bearman, P. J.; Bianquis, Th.; Bosworth, C. E.; van Donzel, E. & Heinrichs, W. P. (eds.). The Encyclopaedia of Islam, Second Edition. Volume XI: W–Z. Leiden: E. J. Brill. ISBN 978-90-04-12756-2.
- Minorsky, Vladimir (2002). "Yag̲h̲mā D̲j̲andaḳī". In Bearman, P. J.; Bianquis, Th.; Bosworth, C. E.; van Donzel, E. & Heinrichs, W. P. (eds.). The Encyclopaedia of Islam, Second Edition. Volume XI: W–Z. Leiden: E. J. Brill. ISBN 978-90-04-12756-2.
- Sonboldel, Farshad (2022). "Margins, Resistance, and Transformation in Classical Persian Poetry: Yaghmā Jandaqi as Precursive Kernel of the Constitutional Revolution Poetry". In Katouzian, Homa; Korangy, Alireza (eds.). Poetry and Revolution: The Poets and Poetry of the Constitutional Era of Iran. Routledge. pp. 105–136. ISBN 978-1032152639.
