= Tomb of Heydar Yaghma =

Tomb in Nishapur County, Iran

- آرامگاه حیدر یغما
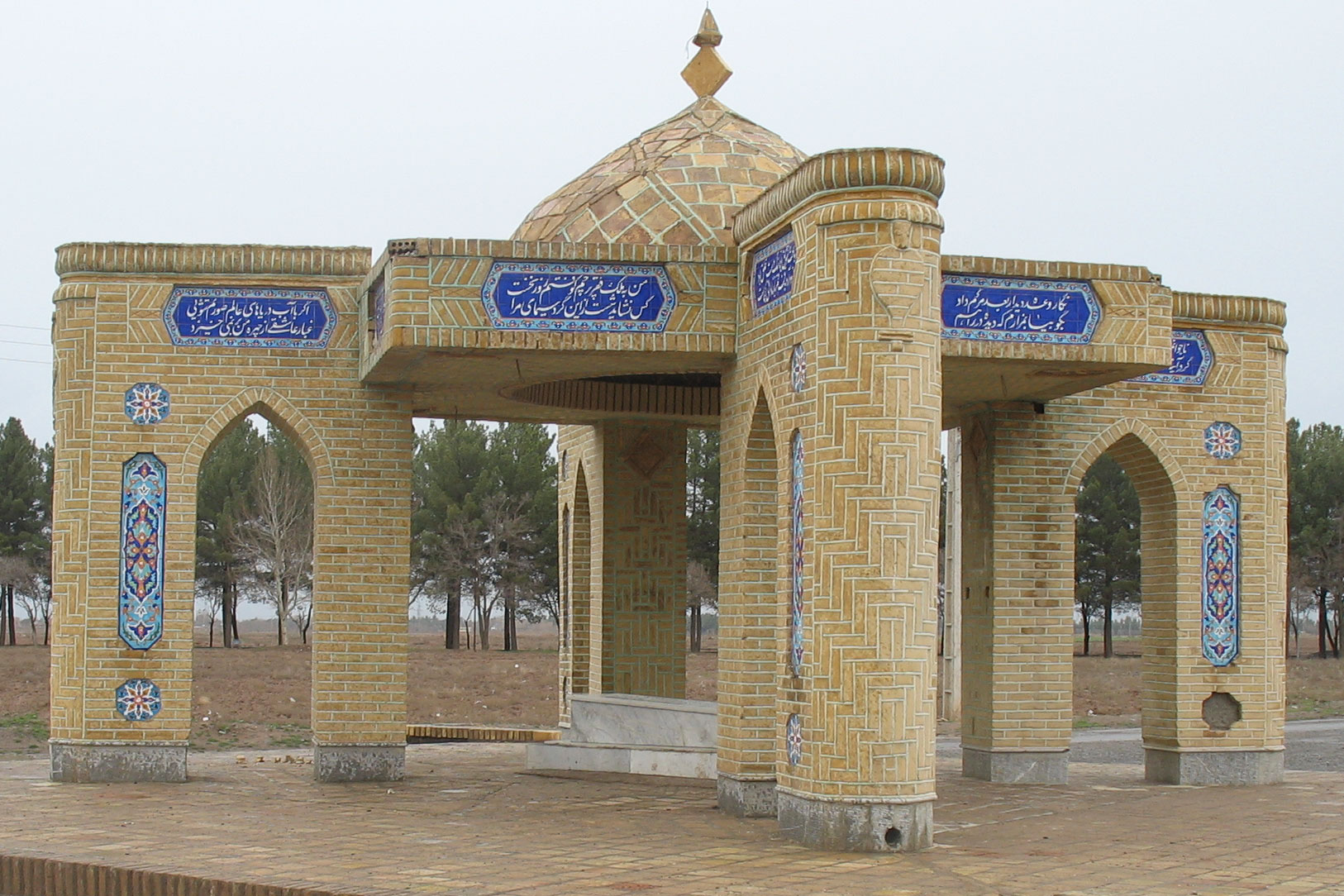
- Tomb of Heydar Yaghma
- Interactive map of the Tomb of Heydar Yaghma area

General information
- Status: Open to the public
- Architectural style: Iranian architecture
- Location: Nishapur, Iran
- Owner: Public

The Tomb of Heydar Yaghma (Persian: آرامگاه حیدر یغما) was built by the Government of the Islamic Republic of Iran and is located in Nishapur.
