= Heydar Yaghma =

- Born: 11 January 1924; Khur, Qajar Iran
- Died: 14 May 1984 (aged 60); Tehran, Islamic Republic of Iran
- Occupations: Poet, literary editor
- Writing career
- Language: Persian

Heydar Yaghma (Persian: حیدر یغما: 11 January 1924 – 14 May 1984) was an Iranian poet and literary editor. He was a descendant of the early-Qajar era poet Yaghma Jandaqi.

== Sources ==
- Gheissari, Ali (2002). "Yag̲h̲māʾī". In Bearman, P. J.; Bianquis, Th.; Bosworth, C. E.; van Donzel, E. & Heinrichs, W. P. (eds.). The Encyclopaedia of Islam, Second Edition. Volume XI: W–Z. Leiden: E. J. Brill. ISBN 978-90-04-12756-2.
