= Farrokhi, Isfahan =

City in Isfahan province, Iran

Farrokhi Persian: فرخي
- City
- Location within Iran
- Coordinates: 33°50′41″N 54°56′37″E
- Country: Iran
- Province: Isfahan
- County: Khur and Biabanak
- District: Central
- Established as a city: 2008

Population (2016)
  - Total: 2,968
- Time zone: UTC+3:30 (IRST)

Farrokhi (Persian: فرخي) (Note: Also romanized as Farrokhī; also known as Farūkhi) is a city in the Central District of Khur and Biabanak County, Isfahan province, Iran, serving as the administrative center for Biabanak Rural District.

== History ==
Farrokhi's documented history begins as late as the Qajar period. It was then one of the eight major villages that constituted Biabanak District of Khur and Biabanak County.

== Demographics ==
=== Language ===
Farrokhi has its local dialect, called Farvi or Farvigi, a variety of the West Iranian language spoken in southern Biabanak district.

=== Population ===
The earliest demographic data comes from the local census of 1884, which recorded 939 inhabitants in 230 households.

At the time of the 2006 National Census, Farrokhi's population was 2,715 in 668 households, when it was a village in Biabanak Rural District of the former Khur and Biabanak District of Nain County. The following census in 2011 counted 2,502 people in 724 households, by which time the district had been separated from the county in the establishment of Khur and Biabanak County. The rural district was transferred to the new Central District, and Farrokhi was converted to a city. The 2016 census measured the population of the city as 2,968 people in 909 households.
