= Jandaq Rural District =

Rural district in Isfahan province, Iran

Jandaq Rural District Persian: دهستان جندق
- Rural District
- Location within Iran
- Coordinates: 33°58′N 54°39′E
- Country: Iran
- Province: Isfahan
- County: Khur and Biabanak
- District: Central
- Established: 1987
- Capital: Jandaq

Population (2016)
  - Total: 173
- Time zone: UTC+3:30 (IRST)

Jandaq Rural District (Persian: دهستان جندق) is in the Central District of Khur and Biabanak County, Isfahan province, Iran. It is administered from the city of Jandaq.

== Demographics ==
=== Population ===
At the time of the 2006 National Census, the rural district's population (as a part of the former Khur and Biabanak District in Nain County) was 208 in 49 households. There were 174 inhabitants in 33 households at the following census of 2011, by which time the district had been separated from the county in the establishment of Khur and Biabanak County. The rural district was transferred to the new Central District. The 2016 census measured the population of the rural district as 173 in 52 households. The most populous of its 20 villages was Mesr, with 133 people.
