= Nakhlestan Rural District (Khur and Biabanak County) =

Rural district in Isfahan province, Iran

Nakhlestan Rural District Persian: دهستان نخلستان
- Rural District
- Location within Iran
- Coordinates: 33°26′N 55°04′E
- Country: Iran
- Province: Isfahan
- County: Khur and Biabanak
- District: Central
- Established: 1987
- Capital: Mehrjan

Population (2016)
  - Total: 2,662
- Time zone: UTC+3:30 (IRST)

Nakhlestan Rural District (Persian: دهستان نخلستان) is in the Central District of Khur and Biabanak County, Isfahan province, Iran. Its capital is the village of Mehrjan.

== Demographics ==
=== Population ===
At the time of the 2006 National Census, the rural district's population (as a part of the former Khur and Biabanak District in Nain County) was 2,396 in 740 households. There were 1,889 inhabitants in 667 households at the following census of 2011, by which time the district had been separated from the county in the establishment of Khur and Biabanak County. The rural district was transferred to the new Central District. The 2016 census measured the population of the rural district as 2,662 in 963 households. The most populous of its 29 villages was Iraj, with 655 people.

=== Other villages in the rural district ===
- Arusan-e Golestan
- Bayazeh
- Baziab
- Garmeh
- Haftuman
- Hoseynabad
- Khonj
- Neyshabur
- Ordib
