= Jandaq =

City in Isfahan province, Iran

Jandaq Persian: جندق
- City
- Location within Iran
- Coordinates: 34°02′18″N 54°24′51″E
- Country: Iran
- Province: Isfahan
- County: Khur and Biabanak
- District: Central
- Established as a city: 1995

Population (2016)
  - Total: 4,665
- Time zone: UTC+3:30 (IRST)

Jandaq (Persian: جندق) (Note: Also romanized as Jondaq; also known as Djandak and Jandak) is a city in the Central District of Khur and Biabanak County, Isfahan province, Iran, serving as the administrative center for Jandaq Rural District. The village of Jandaq was converted to a city in 1995.

The monuments of Jandaq include Jandaq Castle (or Fortress of Ardbil), which seems to date back to the Sasanian Empire, and which is known as the prison of Khosrow Anushirvān.

== Demographics ==
=== Population ===
At the time of the 2006 National Census, the city's population was 3,958 in 1,162 households, when it was in the former Khur and Biabanak District of Nain County. The following census in 2011 counted 4,472 people in 1,319 households, by which time the district had been separated from the county in the establishment of Khur and Biabanak County. The city and the rural district were transferred to the new Central District. The 2016 census measured the population of the city as 4,665 people in 1,477 households.
