= Biabanak Rural District =

Rural district in Isfahan province, Iran

Biabanak Rural District Persian: دهستان بيابانك
- Rural District
- Location within Iran
- Coordinates: 33°54′N 55°00′E
- Country: Iran
- Province: Isfahan
- County: Khur and Biabanak
- District: Central
- Established: 1987
- Capital: Farrokhi

Population (2016)
  - Total: 2,528
- Time zone: UTC+3:30 (IRST)

Biabanak Rural District (Persian: دهستان بيابانك) is in the Central District of Khur and Biabanak County, Isfahan province, Iran. It is administered from the city of Farrokhi.

== Demographics ==
=== Population ===
At the time of the 2006 National Census, the rural district's population (as a part of the former Khur and Biabanak District in Nain County) was 4,710 in 1,219 households. There were 2,035 inhabitants in 626 households at the following census of 2011, by which time the district had been separated from the county in the establishment of Khur and Biabanak County. The rural district was transferred to the new Central District. The 2016 census measured the population of the rural district as 2,528 in 811 households. The most populous of its 37 villages was Chah Malek, with 1,797 people.

=== Other villages in the rural district ===
- Abadan
- Ebrahimabad
- Jafarabad
- Jegarg
- Khorramdasht
- Nasrabad
- Qaderabad
