= Khur, Isfahan =

City in Isfahan province, Iran

Khur Persian: خور
- City
- Location within Iran
- Coordinates: 33°46′26″N 55°05′08″E
- Country: Iran
- Province: Isfahan
- County: Khur and Biabanak
- District: Central

Population (2016)
  - Total: 6,765
- Time zone: UTC+3:30 (IRST)

Khur (Persian: خور) (Note: Also romanized as Khowr and Khūr) is a city in the Central District of Khur and Biabanak County, Isfahan province, Iran, serving as capital of both the county and the district.

== Demographics ==
=== Population ===
At the time of the 2006 National Census, the city's population was 6,216 in 1,754 households, when it was capital of the former Khur and Biabanak District in Nain County. The following census in 2011 counted 6,721 people in 2,065 households, by which time the district had been separated from the county in the establishment of Khur and Biabanak County. Khur was transferred to the new Central District as the county's capital. The 2016 census measured the population of the city as 6,765 people in 2,208 households.

== Climate ==
Khur has a hot desert climate (BWh) according to the Köppen climate classification.

Climate data for Khur (1991-2020 normals, coordinates:33°46′12″N 50°04′54″E)
Month	Jan	Feb	Mar	Apr	May	Jun	Jul	Aug	Sep	Oct	Nov	Dec	Year
Record high °C (°F)	24.2 (75.6)	29.2 (84.6)	36.4 (97.5)	40.7 (105.3)	44.8 (112.6)	46.6 (115.9)	49.7 (121.5)	47.6 (117.7)	43.8 (110.8)	38.4 (101.1)	31.8 (89.2)	27.7 (81.9)	49.7 (121.5)
Mean daily maximum °C (°F)	12.7 (54.9)	15.9 (60.6)	21.5 (70.7)	28 (82)	33.6 (92.5)	38.7 (101.7)	40.4 (104.7)	38.8 (101.8)	35.2 (95.4)	28.8 (83.8)	20.2 (68.4)	14.3 (57.7)	27.3 (81.2)
Daily mean °C (°F)	6.8 (44.2)	9.8 (49.6)	15.3 (59.5)	21.6 (70.9)	27.3 (81.1)	32 (90)	33.9 (93.0)	32 (90)	27.8 (82.0)	21.5 (70.7)	13.6 (56.5)	8.1 (46.6)	20.8 (69.5)
Mean daily minimum °C (°F)	2 (36)	4.4 (39.9)	9.4 (48.9)	15.3 (59.5)	20.7 (69.3)	24.8 (76.6)	27.1 (80.8)	25 (77)	20.6 (69.1)	14.9 (58.8)	8.2 (46.8)	3.3 (37.9)	14.6 (58.4)
Record low °C (°F)	−13.6 (7.5)	−6.6 (20.1)	−3.2 (26.2)	3.5 (38.3)	7.9 (46.2)	14.6 (58.3)	19.4 (66.9)	16.6 (61.9)	11.1 (52.0)	4.5 (40.1)	−6.4 (20.5)	−6.6 (20.1)	−13.6 (7.5)
Average precipitation mm (inches)	12.4 (0.49)	11.9 (0.47)	13.8 (0.54)	11.1 (0.44)	7.2 (0.28)	0.9 (0.04)	0 (0)	0 (0)	0.2 (0.01)	1.3 (0.05)	6.6 (0.26)	8.6 (0.34)	74 (2.92)
Average precipitation days (≥ 1 mm)	2.9	2.2	2.5	2.5	1.4	0.2	0	0	0	0.4	1.6	2.1	15.8
Average snowy days	1.3	0.7	0.2	0	0	0	0	0	0	0	0	0.4	2.6
Average relative humidity (%)	52	43	36	30	24	20	20	20	22	29	40	52	32
Average dew point °C (°F)	−3.2 (26.2)	−3.3 (26.1)	−1.7 (28.9)	1.6 (34.9)	3.7 (38.7)	4.6 (40.3)	6.6 (43.9)	5.3 (41.5)	3 (37)	1.4 (34.5)	−0.7 (30.7)	−2 (28)	1.3 (34.2)
Mean monthly sunshine hours	208	216	243	267	318	358	366	361	322	294	224	210	3,387
Source 1: NOAA NCEI
Source 2: IRIMO(snow/sleet days 1986-2010), Ogimet
