= Ali Gheissari =

Iranian historian and sociologist

- Born: 1954 (age 71–72)

Academic background
- Education: Law and Political Science, University of Tehran (BA) Sociology of Knowledge, University of Essex (MA) History, St. Antony’s College, University of Oxford (D.Phil.)
- Thesis: The Ideological Formation of the Iranian Intelligentsia: From the Constitutional Movement to the Fall of the Monarchy (1989)

Academic work
- Discipline: History of Modern Iran
- Institutions: University of San Diego

Ali Gheissari (born 1954) is an Iranian historian and sociologist. He is research associate of history at the University of San Diego and has research interest in the intellectual history of modern Iran and in modern philosophy and social theory. He has been visiting professor of religious studies at Brown University, Iranian Studies at St. Antony's College, Oxford, and History of Modern Iran at the University of California, Irvine. He is known for his works on the intellectual history and politics of modern Iran. He is on the editorial board of Iran Studies book series published by Brill, and has served as the Editor-in-Chief of the journal Iranian Studies.

== Works ==
Iranian Studies (English and Persian)

- Gheissari, Ali (2024). “Fruits of the Gardens: Ethics, Metaphysics, and Textual Pleasures in late Qajar Iran,” in Journal of Persianate Studies (2024), no. 163, pp. 1–35.
- Gheissari, Ali (2023). On the Concept of Time: Conversation with Ahmad Fardid, complete transcription of an interview dated January 1980, with notes and additions, Qom: Nashr-e Movarrekh, 2022, 120pp (new edition, 2023).
- Gheissari, Ali (2023). “Unequal Treaties and the Question of Sovereignty in Qajar and early Pahlavi Iran,” Ann Lambton Memorial Lecture, Durham Middle East Papers No. 106, Institute for Middle Eastern and Islamic Studies, Durham University, 2023.
- Gheissari, Ali (2022). “ṬEHRĀNI, ḤĀJJ MIRZĀ MOḤAMMAD,” in: Encyclopædia Iranica Online, first published online: 2022
- Gheissari, Ali (2021). “Resāle, Maqāle, and Ketāb: An Overview of Persian Expository and Analytical Prose,” in Ehsan Yarshater (Founding Editor), A History of Persian Literature, Volume V: Persian Prose, Edited by Bo Utas, London: I. B. Tauris / Bloomsbury, 2021, pp. 146–216.
- Gheissari, Ali (2021). “Recollections of the Risbāf [Carding] Complex in Qom” (“Yādi-az Majmuʿeh-ye Risbāf-e Qom”), in Sad-Sālegi-ye Howzeh-ye Qom (The Centennial of the Seminary Center in Qom), ed. Rasul Jaʿfariān, Qom: Nashr-e Movarrekh, 1400 (2021), pp. 575–622.
- Gheissari. Ali (2020). (ed.) The American College of Tehran: A Memorial Album, 1932, prepared by Morteza Gheissari, Edited with an Introduction and Notes by Ali Gheissari, Irvine, CA: University of California, Irvine (UCI), Jordan Center for Persian Studies, 466pp.
- Gheissari, Ali (2019). (ed.) Fruits of Gardens by Hājj Mirzā Mohammad Tehrāni: A Philosophical Miscellany in Arabic and Persian in late Qajar Iran, c. 1914 (Fawāka al-Basātin: Montakhabāti Falsafi, Eʿteqādi, Revāʾi dar Avākher-e Qājāriyeh, asar-e Hājj Mirzā Mohammad Tehrāni), Complete Arabic and Persian Text, in collaboration with Ali-Reza Abāzari, with an Introduction by Ali Gheissari, Qom: Nashr-e Movarrekh, 2019, 431pp; (new edition, 2024).
- Gheissari, Ali (2019). (ed.) Majalleh-ye Estebdād (Journal of Despotism), complete set of a rare satirical periodical published in 1907–1908, during the Iranian Constitutional Revolution, edited with an Introduction and additions by Ali Gheissari, Tehran: Nashr-e Tārikh-e Iran, 2019, 744pp.
- Gheissari, Ali (2018).; Walbridge, John; Alwishah, Ahmed (2017) (eds.) Illuminationist Texts and Textual Studies: Essays in Memory of Hossein Ziai. Brill. ISBN 978-90-04-35658-0.
- Gheissari, Ali (2009). (ed.) Contemporary Iran: Economy, Society, Politics. Oxford University Press. ISBN 978-0-19-537849-8.
- Gheissari, Ali (2008). (ed.) Tabriz and Rasht in the Iranian Constitutional Revolution, 1906-1911: Memoirs of Hājj Mohammad-Taqi Jourābchi (Harfi az Hezārān ke-andar ʿEbārat Āmad), complete text with additions, edited with an Introduction by Ali Gheissari, Tehran: Nashr-e Tārikh-e Iran, (363 pp).
- Gheissari, Ali (2006).; Nasr, Vali (2006). Democracy in Iran: History and the Quest for Liberty. Oxford University Press. ISBN 978-0-19-804087-3.
- Gheissari, Ali (2020). “In Memoriam: Khalil Mostowfi (b. Tabriz, 1941 – d. Tehran, 20 February 2020): Bookseller, Assessor of Manuscripts, Lithographs, and Rare Titles in Iranian Studies,” Iranian Studies, 53/3-4, 2020, pp. 685–690.
- Gheissari, Ali (2019). “In Memoriam: Ehsan Yarshater (3 April 1920-2 September 2018): Doyen of Iranian Studies,” Iranian Studies, 52/1-2, 2019, pp. 283–286.
- Gheissari, Ali (2016). “Iran's Dialectic of Enlightenment: Constitutional Experience, Transregional Connections, and Conflicting Narratives of Modernity,” in Ali M. Ansari (ed.), Iran's Constitutional Revolution of 1906 and Narratives of the Enlightenment, University of Chicago Press (distributed for Gingko Library), 2016, pp. 15–47.
- Gheissari, Ali (2016). “Authorial Voices and the Sense of an Ending in Persian Diaries: Notes on Eʿtemād al-Saltaneh and ʿAlam,” Iranian Studies, 49/4, July 2016, pp. 693–723.
- Gheissari, Ali (2016). “Constitutional Revolution in Iran.” Encyclopedia of Islam and the Muslim World, 2nd edition, Editor-in-Chief: Richard C. Martin, New York, NY: Macmillan Reference, 2016, pp. 253–256.
- Gheissari, Ali (2015). “Khatt va Rabt: The Significance of Private Papers for Qajar Historiography,” Gingko Library, News Blog, originally posted on 5 August 2015.
- Gheissari, Ali (2013). “The U.S. Coup of 1953 in Iran, Sixty Years On,” Passport, the Society for Historians of American Foreign Relations Review, 44/2, September 2013, pp. 23–26.
- Gheissari, Ali (2013). “Mahmud Sanai (1919-1985): professor of Persian literature and of psychology, psychoanalyst, educator, writer, translator, and government official,” Encyclopædia Iranica.
- Gheissari, Ali (2012). “Zein al-Abedin Motamen (1914-2005): teacher, writer, and scholar of Persian literature,” Encyclopædia Iranica.
- Gheissari, Ali (2011). “The American College of Tehran, 1929-1931: A Memorial Album,” Iranian Studies, 44/5, Special Issue: Alborz College, Guest Editor: Nasrin Rahimieh, 2011, pp. 671–713.
- Gheissari, Ali (2010). “Constitutional Rights and the Development of Civil Law in Iran, 1907-1941,” in Iran's Constitutional Revolution: Politics, Cultural Transformations, and Transnational Connections, eds. H. E. Chehabi and Vanessa Martin, London: I. B. Tauris, 2010, pp. 60–79 (notes, pp. 419–427).
- Gheissari, Ali (2010). “Shadman (Šādmān), Sayyed Fakhr-al-Din (1907-1967): Cultural Critic and Writer of Fiction, Professor of History, Civil Servant, and Cabinet Minister,” Encyclopædia Iranica.
- Gheissari, Ali (2009). “New Conservative Politics and Electoral Behavior in Iran,” co-author Kaveh Cyrus Sanandaji, in Ali Gheissari (ed.), Contemporary Iran: Economy, Society, Politics, Oxford and New York: Oxford University Press, 2009, pp. 275–298.
- Gheissari, Ali (2008). “Merchants without Borders: Trade, Travel, and a Revolution in late Qajar Iran,” in Roxane Farmanfarmaian (ed.), War and Peace in Qajar Persia: Implications Past and Present, London: Routledge, 2008, pp. 183–212.
- Gheissari, Ali (2005). “Despots of the World Unite! Satire in the Iranian Constitutional Press: The Majalleh-ye Estebdād, 1907-1908,” Comparative Studies of South Asia, Africa and the Middle East, 25/2, Special Issue: Retrospectives on the Iranian Constitutional Revolution 1905–1909, Guest Editor: Houri Berberian, 2005, pp. 360–376.
- Gheissari, Ali (1995). Iranian Intellectuals in the Twentieth Century. University of Texas Press. ISBN 978-0-292-72804-2.
- Gheissari, Ali (1995). “Truth and Method in Modern Iranian Historiography and Social Sciences,” Critique (Journal for Critical Studies of the Middle East), Vol. 4, No. 6, 1995, pp. 39–56.
- Gheissari, Ali (1993). “Poetry and Politics of Farrokhi Yazdi,” Iranian Studies, Vol. 26, No. 1/2 (Winter-Spring, 1993), pp. 33–50.

Philosophy and Social Theory (Persian)

- Gheissari, Ali (2018). Kant on Time and Other Essays (Persian title: Zamān az Didgāh-e Kānt va Chand Maqāleh-ye Digar) (authored), Tehran: Khwārazmi Publishers, 2018.
- Gheissari, Ali (2015). (tr.) Max Scheler and Phenomenology (Persian title: Max Scheler va Padidār-shenāsi), a collection of essays by Manfred S. Frings et al., selected and translated, with notes and additions by Ali Gheissari, Tehran: Khwārazmi Publishers, 2015, 181pp.
- Gheissari, Ali (2015). Persian translation of Immanuel Kant's Groundwork of the Metaphysics of Etics (Persian title: Bonyād-e Mābaʿd al-Tabiʿa-ye Akhlāq: Goftāri dar Hekmat-e Kerdār), with Hamid Enayat, Tehran: Khwārazmi Publishers, 1991; new edition, Tehran: Khwārazmi Publishers, 2015.
- Gheissari, Ali (2017). “On Transcendental Constitution of the Self and of the Other” (Persian title: “Khod, Digari, Digarān: Jostāri dar bāb-e Taqavvom-e Esteʿlāʾi), in In Search of Reason and Liberty:ʿEzzatollāh Fulādvand Festschrift (Dar Jostuju-ye Kherad va Āzādi: Arjnāmeh-ye ʿEzzatollā Fulādvand), Tehran: Minu-ye Kherad Publishers, 2017, pp. 402-414.
- Gheissari, Ali (2014). “On Rational Essence” (Persian title: “Darbāreh-ye Zāt-e Maʿqul”), in Rasul Jaʿfariān (ed.), Jashn-Nāmeh-ye Āyatollāh Rezā Ostādi (Āyatollāh Rezā Ostādi Festschrift), Qom, 1393 (2014), pp. 717–724.
- Gheissari, Ali (2013). “Time in Formal Logic” (Persian title: “Zamān dar Manteq-e Suri”), Falsafeh (Philosophy), Vol. 6, No. 66, Tehran, March 2013, pp. 58–62.
- Gheissari, Ali (2012). “Lukacs on True and False Consciousness” (Persian title: “Āgāhi-ye Dorost va Nādorost az Didgāh-e Lukāch”), Falsafeh (Philosophy), No. 59, Tehran, August 2012, pp. 119–126.
- Gheissari, Ali (2012). “Structure and the Question of Subjectivity: Notes on the Theory of Knowledge” (Persian title: “Qaziyeh-ye Sākhtār va Zehn dar Nazariyeh-ye Shenākht”), Falsafeh (Philosophy), No. 54, Tehran, March 2012, pp. 22–30.
- Gheissari, Ali (2011). “Interpretation in the Sociology of Knowledge” (Persian title: “Tafsir dar Jāmeʿeh-shenāsi-ye Maʿrefat”), Falsafeh (Philosophy), No. 46, Tehran, July 2011, pp. 101–117.
- Gheissari, Ali (2010). “Kant's Concept of Time: A New Approach” (Persian title: “Zamān az Didgāh-e Kant”), Falsafeh (Philosophy), special issue on Kant Studies, No. 30, Tehran, March 2010, pp. 67–72.
- Gheissari, Ali (2008). “Vosuq al-Dawleh's 1935 Lecture on the Philosophy of Kant,” edited by Ali Gheissari, Falsafeh (Philosophy), No. 12, Tehran, September 2008, pp. 9–25.
- Gheissari, Ali (2008). “Kant's Second Critique” (Persian title: “Pishgoftār-e Naqd-e ʿAql-e ʿAmali”). Persian translation of Immanuel Kant's “Preface” to Critique of Practical Reason, with terminological glossary, notes and commentary, Falsafeh (Philosophy), No. 8, Tehran, May 2008, pp. 66–79.
- Gheissari, Ali (2005). “Outline for a Phenomenology of Imagination,” Persian translation by Ali Moʿazzami, as “Darāmadi bar Padidār-Shenāsi-ye Takhayyol,” in Shapur Etemad et al. (eds.), Metaphysics and Science: Essays in the Memory of Yusef Aliābādi, Tehran, Iranian Institute of Philosophy, 2005, pp. 22–51.
- Gheissari, Ali (2000). “The Concept of Time in the Sociology of Culture” (Persian title: “Mafhum-e Zamān dar Jāmeʿeh-shenāsi-ye Fargang”), Goftemān (Discourse) (A Quarterly Journal of Social Theory, Culture, and Literary Criticism), special issue, Goftmān va Tahlil-e Goftmāni (Discourse and Discourse Analysis), ed. M. R. Tajik, Tehran, 2000, pp. 275–286.
