= Central District (Khur and Biabanak County) =

District in Isfahan province, Iran

Central District (Khur and Biabanak County) Persian: بخش مرکزی شهرستان خور و بیابانک
- District
- Location within Iran
- Coordinates: 33°40′32″N 54°46′00″E
- Country: Iran
- Province: Isfahan
- County: Khur and Biabanak
- Established: 2009
- Capital: Khur

Population (2016)
  - Total: 19,761
- Time zone: UTC+3:30 (IRST)

The Central District of Khur and Biabanak County (Persian: بخش مرکزی شهرستان خور و بیابانک) is in Isfahan province, Iran. Its capital is the city of Khur.

== History ==
In 2009, Khur and Biabanak District was separated from Nain County in the establishment of Khur and Biabanak County, with Khur as its capital.

== Demographics ==
=== Population ===
At the time of the 2011 National Census, the district's population was 17,793 people in 5,434 households. The 2016 census measured the population of the district as 19,761 inhabitants in 6,420 households.

=== Administrative divisions ===
Central District (Khur and Biabanak County) Population
Administrative Divisions	2011	2016
Biabanak RD	2,035	2,528
Jandaq RD	174	173
Nakhlestan RD	1,889	2,662
Farrokhi (city)	2,502	2,968
Jandaq (city)	4,472	4,665
Khur (city)	6,721	6,765
Total	17,793	19,761
RD = Rural District
