= Khur and Biabanak County =

County in Isfahan province, Iran

Khur and Biabanak County Persian: شهرستان خور و بیابانک
- County
- Location of Khur and Biabanak County in Isfahan province (right, purple)

- Location of Isfahan province in Iran
- Coordinates: 33°40′32″N 54°46′00″E
- Country: Iran
- Province: Isfahan
- Established: 2009
- Capital: Khur
- Districts: Central

Population (2016)
  - Total: 19,761
- Time zone: UTC+3:30 (IRST)

Khur and Biabanak County (Persian: شهرستان خور و بیابانک) (Note: Also romanized as Shahrestāne Khur va Biābānak) is in Isfahan province, Iran. Its capital is the city of Khur.

== History ==
In 2009, Khur and Biabanak District was separated from Nain County in the establishment of Khur and Biabanak County, with Khur as its capital.

== Demographics ==
=== Population ===
At the time of the 2011 National Census, the county's population was 17,793 people in 5,412 households. The 2016 census measured the population of the county as 19,761 in 6,420 households. Khur and Biabanak County has the smallest population of Iran's mainland counties. (Abumusa County, consisting of islands in the Persian Gulf, has a smaller population).

=== Administrative divisions ===
Khur and Biabanak County's population history and administrative structure over two consecutive censuses are shown in the following table.

Khur and Biabanak County Population
| Administrative Divisions | 2011 | 2016 |
|---|---|---|
| Central District | 17,793 | 19,761 |
| Biabanak RD | 2,035 | 2,528 |
| Jandaq RD | 174 | 173 |
| Nakhlestan RD | 1,889 | 2,662 |
| Farrokhi (city) | 2,502 | 2,968 |
| Jandaq (city) | 4,472 | 4,665 |
| Khur (city) | 6,721 | 6,765 |
| Total | 17,793 | 19,761 |
RD = Rural District

== See also ==
Media related to Khur and Biabanak County at Wikimedia Commons
