= Khur and Biabanak District =

Former district in Isfahan province, Iran

Khur and Biabanak District Persian: بخش خور و بیابانک
- Former District
- Location within Iran
- Coordinates: 33°40′32″N 54°46′00″E
- Country: Iran
- Province: Isfahan
- County: Nain
- Capital: Khur

Population (2006)
  - Total: 17,488
- Time zone: UTC+3:30 (IRST)

Khur and Biabanak District (Persian: بخش خور و بیابانک) is a former administrative division of Nain County, Isfahan province, Iran. Its capital was the city of Khur.

== History ==
In 2009, the district was separated from the county in the establishment of Khur and Biabanak County.

== Demographics ==
=== Population ===
At the time of the 2006 National Census, the district's population was 17,488 in 4,924 households.

=== Administrative divisions ===
Khur and Biabanak District Population
Administrative Divisions	2006
Biabanak RD	4,710
Jandaq RD	208
Nakhlestan RD	2,396
Jandaq (city)	3,958
Khur (city)	6,216
Total	17,488
RD = Rural District
