= Lenjan County Mass Transit Organization =

Falavarjan County Municipalities Mass Transit Organization Falavarbus سازمان حمل و نقل جمعی شهرداریهای شهرستان فلاورجان
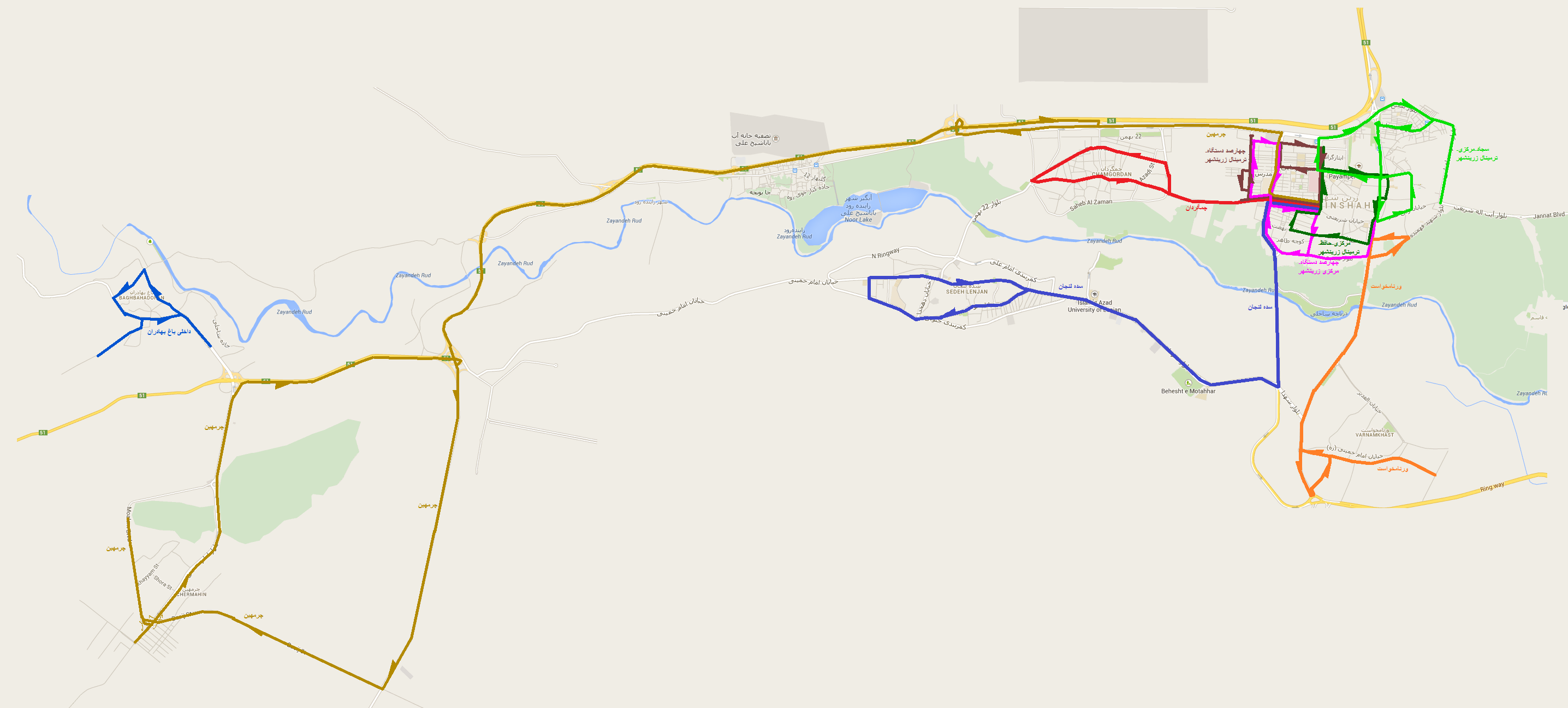
- Headquarters: 21 May 1996
- Service area: Lenjan County, Isfahan Province
- Service type: Bus service
- Fleet: 25 buses
- Operator: Lenjan County Governorship
- Chief executive: Mohammad Savari Jamalu'i
- Website: سازمان حمل و نقل جمعی شهرستان فلاورجان

Lenjan County Mass Transit Organization (Persian: سازمان حمل و نقل جمعی شهرستان لنجان) is a public transport agency running Transit buses in Lenjan County, located in southeastern Isfahan city, in Greater Isfahan Region, Central Iran. The organization serves the cities of Zarrinshahr, Fuladshahr, Sedeh Lenjan, Chamgardan, Varnamkhast, Zayandeh Rud, Charmahin, and Bagh-e Bahadoran.

== Fleets per city ==
City	Number of buses
Zarrinshahr	7
Fuladshahr	6
Sedeh Lenjan	3
Chamgardan	3
Varnamkhast	3
Zayandeh Rud	2
Charmahin	2
Bagh-e Bahadoran	2
