= Khaledabad (disambiguation) =

Khaledabad is a city in Isfahan Province, Iran.

Khaledabad (Persian: خالدآباد) may also refer to various places in Iran:

- Khaledabad, Fars
- Khaledabad, Marvdasht, Fars Province
- Khaledabad, Kerman
- Khaledabad, North Khorasan
- Khaledabad, Tehran
- Khaledabad, Oshnavieh, West Azerbaijan Province
- Khaledabad, Urmia, West Azerbaijan Province
- Khaledabad Rural District, in Isfahan Province
