= Judicial centers in Isfahan province =

Isfahan province (Persian: استان اصفهان, romanized: Ostāne Esfahan), also transliterated as Esfahan, Espahan, Isfahan, or Isphahan, is one of the thirty-one provinces of Iran. It is located in the center of the country in Region 2. The provincial secretariat is located in the city of Isfahan.

The Judicial centers in Isfahan province include:

Name	Location
General department of justice of Isfahan province	Nikhbakht st
Judicial complex 1	22 Bahman st
Revolution court & Judicial complex 2	Atashgah st
Judicial complex 3	Jaberansari st
Revolution court & Judicial complex 4	Ashrafi esfahani blvd
Judicial complex 5	Jey st
Judicial complex Baharestan	
Shohadaye 7th Tir	Meraj st
Special economic court	Kharazi highway
Ayatollah Shahrodi complex	Atashgah
Shahid motahari complex	Emam khomeini st, Ghalamestan park
Shahid ghodoosi complex	Mir street
General Suleimani complex	Mir street
Province headquarters for justice department	Chaharbagh bala, Nazar junction
'Name of County district'	Location
Ardestan	Ghiam st, Department of Justice
Aran and bidgol	Ayatollah ameli blvd
Badroud	vali asr st
Bagh bahadoran	vali asr blvd
Borkhar (Dowlat abad)	Janbazan blvd
Borkhar (Dowlat abad)	Taleghani blvd
Boein miandasht	
Tiran and karvan	Emam blvd
Jolge	
Chadegan	Farhang st
Khomeini shahr	Daneshjoo blvd
Khansar	15 khordad st
Khor and biabanak	Fatemi blvd
Dehaghan	Golestan blvd
Zavareh	Shahid motahari st
Semirom	Reihane sq
Shahin shahr	Montazeri blvd
Shahin shahr	Dehkhoda st
Shahreza	7th Tir square
Fereidan	Taleghani blvd
Fereydounshahr	Golestan shohada st
Felavarjan	Mola sadra st
Kashan	
Karvan	
Koohpayeh	Emam reza blvd
Golpaygan	Salman Farsi Blvd.
Lenjan (Zarin shahr)	Kashani st
Mobarakeh	Emam blvd
Mehrdasht	
Meime	Islamic revolution blvd
Naein	Edalat st
Najaf Abad	South Beltroad
Natanz	Shahid beheshti st
