= Arisman =

Village in Isfahan province, Iran

Arisman Persian: اريسمان
- Village
- Location within Iran
- Coordinates: 33°39′43″N 51°59′44″E
- Country: Iran
- Province: Isfahan
- County: Natanz
- District: Emamzadeh
- Rural District: Emamzadeh Aqaali Abbas

Population (2016)
  - Total: 2,018
- Time zone: UTC+3:30 (IRST)

Arisman (Persian: اريسمان) (Note: Also romanized as Arīsmān and Erīsmān; also known as Azīsmān and Brīsmān) is a village in, and the capital of, Emamzadeh Aqaali Abbas Rural District in Emamzadeh District of Natanz County, Isfahan province, Iran.

== Demographics ==
=== Population ===
At the time of the 2006 National Census, the village's population was 1,745 in 489 households. The following census in 2011 counted 1,838 people in 569 households. The 2016 census measured the population of the village as 2,018 people in 690 households. It was the most populous village in its rural district.

== Ancient metallurgy ==
At Arisman, some of the oldest evidence of silver production in the world has been found - such as the litharge fragments and cakes. This was taking place around 3600 BC. Arsenical copper production was also taking place.

The ore was mined from some polymetallic ore deposits in the same area. These deposits contain a mixture of copper, arsenic, lead, and silver. First, the ore was smelted, and then the second step of cupellation was used to separate arsenical copper and silver.

== See also ==
- Tepe Sialk
