= Matinabad =

Village in Isfahan province, Iran

Matinabad Persian: متين اباد
- Village
- Location within Iran
- Coordinates: 33°45′51″N 51°58′53″E
- Country: Iran
- Province: Isfahan
- County: Natanz
- District: Emamzadeh
- Rural District: Khaledabad

Population (2016)
  - Total: 654
- Time zone: UTC+3:30 (IRST)

Matinabad (Persian: متین‌آباد) (Note: Also romanized as Matīnābād) is a village in Khaledabad Rural District of Emamzadeh District in Natanz County, Isfahan province, Iran.

== Demographics ==
=== Population ===
At the time of the 2006 National Census, the village's population was 547 in 137 households. The following census in 2011 counted 623 people in 166 households. The 2016 census measured the population of the village as 654 people in 199 households.
