= Habibabad, Natanz =

Village in Isfahan province, Iran

Habibabad Persian: حبيب اباد
- Village
- Location within Iran
- Country: Iran
- Province: Isfahan
- County: Natanz
- District: Emamzadeh
- Rural District: Emamzadeh Aqaali Abbas

Population (2016)
  - Total: Below reporting threshold
- Time zone: UTC+3:30 (IRST)

Habibabad (Persian: حبيب اباد) (Note: Also romanized as Ḩabībābād) is a village in Emamzadeh Aqaali Abbas Rural District of Emamzadeh District in Natanz County, Isfahan province, Iran.

== Demographics ==
=== Population ===
At the time of the 2006 National Census, the village's population was 23 in six households. The following censuses in 2011 and 2016 counted a population below the reporting threshold.
