= Fami =

Village in Isfahan province, Iran

Fami Persian: فمي
- Village
- Location within Iran
- Coordinates: 33°44′36″N 51°58′02″E
- Country: Iran
- Province: Isfahan
- County: Natanz
- District: Emamzadeh
- Rural District: Khaledabad

Population (2016)
  - Total: 1,142
- Time zone: UTC+3:30 (IRST)

Fami (Persian: فمي) (Note: Also romanized as Famī; also known as Pambi) is a village in Khaledabad Rural District of Emamzadeh District in Natanz County, Isfahan province, Iran.

== Demographics ==
=== Population ===
At the time of the 2006 National Census, the village's population was 998 in 234 households. The following census in 2011 counted 1,127 people in 293 households. The 2016 census measured the population of the village as 1,142 people in 332 households.
