= Abbasabad, Natanz =

Village in Isfahan province, Iran

Abbasabad Persian: عباس اباد
- Village
- Location within Iran
- Coordinates: 33°40′50″N 52°03′09″E
- Country: Iran
- Province: Isfahan
- County: Natanz
- District: Emamzadeh
- Rural District: Emamzadeh Aqaali Abbas

Population (2016)
  - Total: 233
- Time zone: UTC+3:30 (IRST)

Abbasabad (Persian: عباس‌آباد) (Note: Also romanized as ‘Abbāsābād; also known as Mobārakābād (مبارک‌آباد)) is a village in Emamzadeh Aqaali Abbas Rural District of Emamzadeh District in Natanz County, Isfahan province, Iran.

== Demographics ==
=== Population ===
At the time of the 2006 National Census, the village's population was 206 in 58 households. The following census in 2011 counted 218 people in 70 households. The 2016 census measured the population of the village as 233 people in 79 households.
