= Sar Asiab, Isfahan =

Village in Isfahan province, Iran

Sar Asiab Persian: سراسياب
- Village
- Location within Iran
- Coordinates: 33°39′57″N 51°57′38″E
- Country: Iran
- Province: Isfahan
- County: Natanz
- District: Emamzadeh
- Rural District: Emamzadeh Aqaali Abbas

Population (2016)
  - Total: 289
- Time zone: UTC+3:30 (IRST)

Sar Asiab (Persian: سراسياب) (Note: Also romanized as Sar Āsīāb; also known as Darb-e Āsyāb-e Bād) is a village in Emamzadeh Aqaali Abbas Rural District of Emamzadeh District in Natanz County, Isfahan province, Iran.

== Demographics ==
=== Population ===
At the time of the 2006 National Census, the village's population was 165 in 48 households. The following census in 2011 counted 207 people in 66 households. The 2016 census measured the population of the village as 289 people in 97 households.
