= Dehabad, Natanz =

Village in Isfahan province, Iran

Dehabad Persian: ده اباد
- Village
- Location within Iran
- Coordinates: 33°44′00″N 51°57′02″E
- Country: Iran
- Province: Isfahan
- County: Natanz
- District: Emamzadeh
- Rural District: Khaledabad

Population (2016)
  - Total: 1,538
- Time zone: UTC+3:30 (IRST)

Dehabad (Persian: ده اباد) (Note: Also romanized as Dehābād and Dahābād) is a village in Khaledabad Rural District of Emamzadeh District in Natanz County, Isfahan province, Iran.

== Demographics ==
=== Population ===
At the time of the 2006 National Census, the village's population was 1,791 in 441 households. The following census in 2011 counted 1,543 people in 424 households. The 2016 census measured the population of the village as 1,538 people in 517 households. It was the most populous village in its rural district.
