= Hoseyniyeh, Isfahan =

Village in Isfahan province, Iran

Hoseyniyeh Persian: حسينيه
- Village
- Country: Iran
- Province: Isfahan
- County: Natanz
- District: Emamzadeh
- Rural District: Emamzadeh Aqaali Abbas

Population (2016)
  - Total: 29
- Time zone: UTC+3:30 (IRST)

Hoseyniyeh (Persian: حسينيه) (Note: Also romanized as Ḩoseynīyeh) is a village in Emamzadeh Aqaali Abbas Rural District of Emamzadeh District in Natanz County, Isfahan province, Iran.

== Demographics ==
=== Population ===
At the time of the 2006 National Census, the village's population was 18 in six households. The following census in 2011 counted a population below the reporting threshold. The 2016 census measured the population of the village as 29 people in 16 households.
