= Emamzadeh Aqaali Abbas Rural District =

Rural district in Isfahan province, Iran

Emamzadeh Aqaali Abbas Rural District Persian: دهستان امامزاده آقاعلي عباس
- Rural District
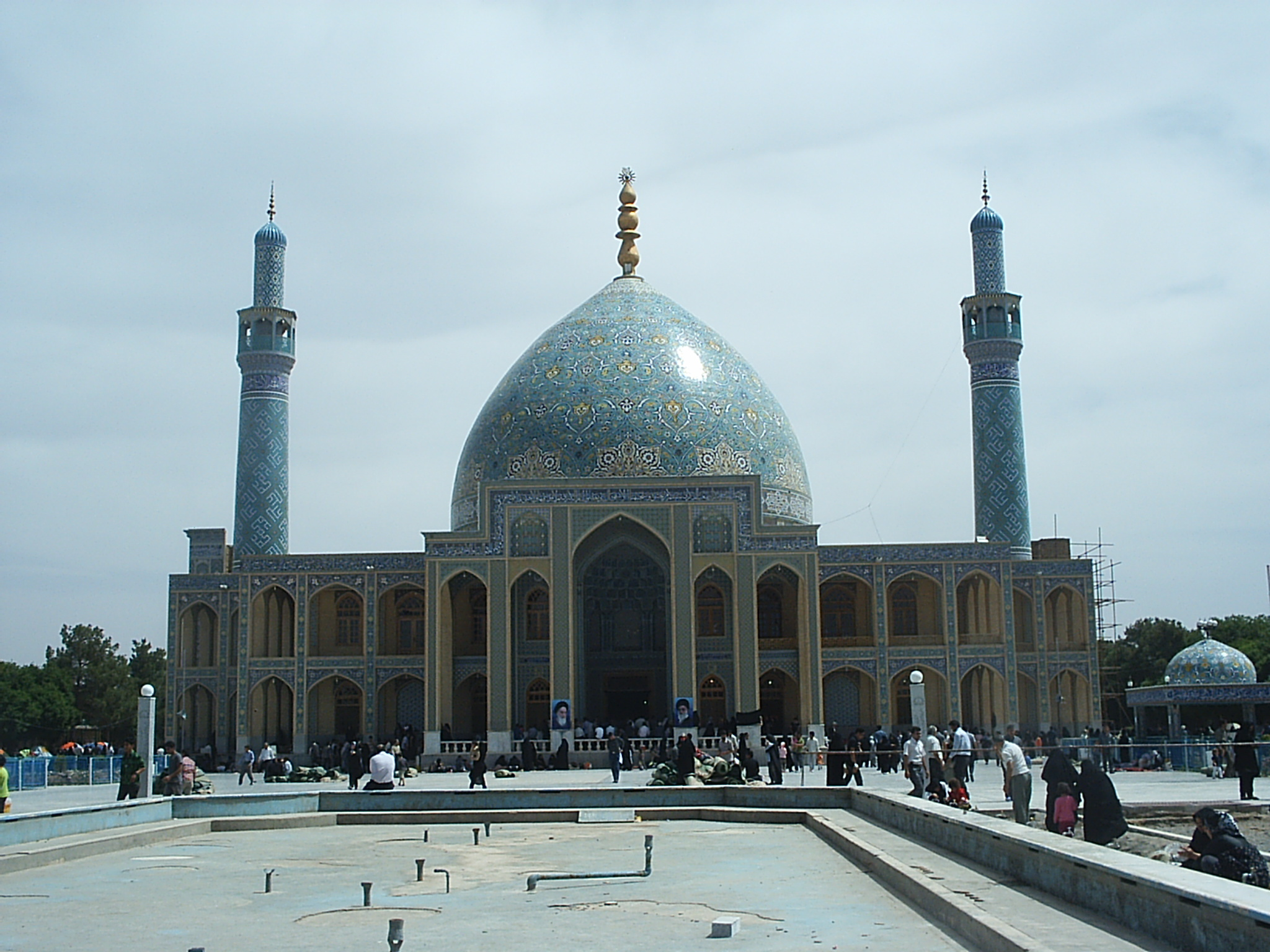

- Location within Iran
- Coordinates: 33°46′N 52°06′E
- Country: Iran
- Province: Isfahan
- County: Natanz
- District: Emamzadeh
- Established: 1987
- Capital: Arisman

Population (2016)
  - Total: 2,654
- Time zone: UTC+3:30 (IRST)

Emamzadeh Aqaali Abbas Rural District (Persian: دهستان امامزاده آقاعلي عباس) is in Emamzadeh District of Natanz County, Isfahan province, Iran. Its capital is the village of Arisman.

== Demographics ==
=== Population ===
At the time of the 2006 National Census, the rural district's population was 2,174 in 613 households. There were 2,304 inhabitants in 724 households at the following census of 2011. The 2016 census measured the population of the rural district as 2,654 in 923 households. The most populous of its 16 villages was Arisman, with 2,018 people.

=== Other villages in the rural district ===
- Abbasabad
- Habibabad
- Hoseyniyeh
- Sar Asiab
