= Khaledabad Rural District =

Rural district in Isfahan province, Iran

Khaledabad Rural District Persian: دهستان خالدآباد
- Rural District
- Location within Iran
- Coordinates: 33°46′N 51°57′E
- Country: Iran
- Province: Isfahan
- County: Natanz
- District: Emamzadeh
- Established: 1999
- Capital: Khaledabad

Population (2016)
  - Total: 3,345
- Time zone: UTC+3:30 (IRST)

Khaledabad Rural District (Persian: دهستان خالدآباد) is in Emamzadeh District of Natanz County, Isfahan province, Iran. It is administered from the city of Khaledabad.

== Demographics ==
=== Population ===
At the time of the 2006 National Census, the rural district's population was 3,338 in 813 households. There were 3,293 inhabitants in 883 households at the following census of 2011. The 2016 census measured the population of the rural district as 3,345 in 1,054 households. The most populous of its six villages was Dehabad, with 1,538 people.

=== Other villages in the rural district ===
- Fami
- Matinabad
