= Islamic Azad University, Khomeyni Shahr Branch =

Branch of Islamic Azad University

Coordinates: 32.716°N 51.482°E

Islamic Azad University, KhomeyniShahr Branch
- دانشگاه آزاد اسلامی واحد خمینی شهر; Dāneshgāh-e Āzād-e Eslāmi Vāhed-e Khomeini Shahr
- Motto: آرمان ایرانی برای جهانی شدن (English: Iranian Aspiration for Globalization)
- Type: Private
- Established: 1988
- Chancellor: Dr. Ali Heydari
- Academic staff: 530
- Administrative staff: 133
- Students: 9000
- Location: Khomeinishahr, Isfahan, Iran
- Website: www.iaukhsh.ac.ir

The Islamic Azad University, Khomeyni Shahr Branch (Also written Khomeynishahr, Khomeyni-Shahr, Khomeini-Shahr) (IAUKHSH) is a branch of the Islamic Azad University and is located in Khomeyni Shahr, the north western zone of Isfahan, the cultural capital of Iran. It was established 17 May 1988. The university serves more than 9000 students at undergraduate and postgraduate levels. It has 530 full and part-time faculty members carrying out education and research in different fields. Due to its geographical location which borders Isfahan University of Technology, it has made an opportunity for the students to study in different areas. The admission to university is based on entrance examination and the admission rate was 10% in 2018.

== Academics ==
=== Academic campus ===
IAUKHSH campus is one of the largest university campus in the Middle East located in Khomeyni Shahr, Isfahan, occupying about 173 acres (700,000 m^{2}) in the city of Khomeyni Shahr in the pleasant touristic province of Isfahan. The largest academic library of Iran is located on this campus.

=== Faculties/Colleges ===
- Faculty of Law and Economics
- Faculty of Mechanical Engineering
- Faculty of Human Sciences
- Faculty of Engineering|Technology and Engineering
- Faculty of Civil Engineering
- Faculty of Fine Arts|Arts, Architecture and Urban Planning
- Faculty of Electrical Engineering
- Faculty of Computer Engineering
- Sama Technical and Vocational College

=== Education ===
==== Undergraduate Programs Offered ====
The IAU, Khomeinishahr branch currently presents 21 undergraduate (B.Sc. & B.A) programs:

Faculty of Law and Economics

- Law
- Economics
- Accounting

Faculty of Mechanical & Civil Engineering

- Aerospace engineering
- Mechanical engineering (Solid)
- Mechanical engineering (Solid Technology)
- Mechanical engineering (Fluid)
- Mechanical engineering (Fluid Technology)
- Mechanical engineering (Production & Manufacturing)
- Mechanical engineering (Automotive & Installation)
- Mechanical engineering (Automobile Mechanics Technology)
- Mechanical engineering (Cooling & Heating Installations Technology)
- Mechanical engineering (Machine Tools)
- Civil engineering (Civil)

Faculty of Engineering

- Electrical engineering (Power)
- Electrical engineering technology (Power)
- Electrical engineering (Control)
- Electrical engineering technology (Distributing and Transmission Network)
- Computer sciences (Software engineering)
- Computer engineering (Computer Software Technology)
- Biomedical engineering (Bioelectric)

Faculty of Humanities

- Guidance & counseling
- Social work

==== Graduate Programs Offered ====
At present, the IAU, Khomeinishahr branch has 9 graduate (M.Sc. & M.A) programs:

Faculty of Law and Economics

- Law (Family Law & Law and Economics)
- Economic sciences (Economic Planning & Development & E-Commerce)
- Economical and social statistics

Faculty of Mechanical & Civil Engineering

- Mechanical engineering (Energy Conversion)
- Mechanical engineering (Production & Manufacturing)
- Mechanical engineering (Applied Design)
- Mechanical engineering (Mechatronics)

Faculty of Engineering

- Electrical engineering (Power)
- Electrical engineering (Control)

Faculty of Humanities

- Economic sciences (Economic Planning & Development)
- Guidance & counseling
- Economical and social statistics

== Clubs & Scientific Associations ==
Young researchers’ club was established by the university for young talented students who pursue academic research. All scholars between the ages of 15 and 30 may join this club provided that they meet the requirements for admission. Furthermore, a number of scientific associations are active in different research activities. They are as follows:

- Mechanical Engineering Scientific Association
- Aerospace Engineering Scientific Association
- Robotics Scientific Association
- Civil Engineering Scientific Association
- Electrical Engineering Scientific Association
- Computer Engineering Scientific Association
- Artificial Intelligence Scientific Association
- Biomedical Engineering Scientific Association
- Nanotechnology Scientific Association
- Economics Scientific Association
- Guidance and Counseling Scientific Association
- Social Work Scientific Association

== Honors ==
=== Comptetions ===
Though the university website is not updated regularly, this list is mentioned on it:

Description of the invention	Description of the invention	Festivals	Award	Name of students
For Commending Excellent and Creative effort to invent Order implementation system of electricity distribution network	3-7 December 2009	Seoul International Invention Fair 2009	Bronze	Mr. Behnam Forouzandeh Hafshejani
intelligent control system for small boats	23 April 2010	International Exhibition Inventions OF GENEVA	Bronze	Pedram MOGHIM, Ali ETESAM, Mohammad reza SHIRVANI POUR, Ahmad reza ABEDIN, Amin ASHTARTI LORAKI
drone ship with transverse stabilizers that difficult to spot	23 April 2010	International Exhibition Inventions OF GENEVA	Bronze	Pedram MOGHIM, Ali ETESAM, Mohammad reza SHIRVANI POUR, Ahmad reza ABEDIN, Amin ASHTARTI LORAKI
Outdoor Flight Dynamics - Fixed Wing MAV	9 July 2010	International Micro Air Vehicle Conference and Flight Competition 2010 - Germany	4th Place	Sepanta team, Omid Jamshidi AfarAni, Pouya Tabibi, Mehrdad Golkar
Outdoor Autonomy - Fixed Wing MAV	9 July 2010	International Micro Air Vehicle Conference and Flight Competition 2010 - Germany	5th Place	Sepanta team, Omid Jamshidi Afarani, Pouya Tabibi, Mehrdad Golkar
RoboCup Junior Soccer League Light Weight Soccer A	19-25 June 2010	Robocup 2010 SINGAPORE	2nd Place	Mikail SHAPOORY ARANI
Endurance competition at the Outdoor Competition in't Harde, the Netherlands	12-15 sep 2011	International Micro Air Vehicle Conference and Flight Competition- IMAV2011	3rd Place	Omid Jamshidi Afarani head of the Dr. Hesabi team, Pouya Tabibi, Navid Khazdooz, Hosein Jamshidi, Alireza Moradi
Replacing electronic system with stimulant valve mechanism in various internal combustion engines	3 November 2012	International Trade Fair Ideas inventions innovations Nurnberg	Bronze	Ali Akbar Rashidi

=== Inventions ===
A number of students' registered inventions with superior ranking in International competitions:

1. Full – automatic dishwasher

2. Microscopic homogenization of surfaces through penetration method

3. Liquid mechanical pump

4. Vehicle side mirror with the capability of vision in several directions

5. Car hood movable from front and back

6. Rubber sclerometer

7. Intelligent anti-lock brake for motorcycle

8. 11-Function carpentry device

9. Wetting device and gas preparatory device for polymetric fuel cell

10. Simple geer designing software

11. Manufacture of electric soldering iron by using graphite energized by 5 to 24 – volt batteries

12. Car and house alarms capable of using coil

13. Electrochemical CU.C.AL battery without ion exchange

14. Mechanical switch torque and high – stroke stimulator of micro – switch

15. Hydroelectric device converting fluid energy to constant energy

16. Air pollutant purification device special for industrial centers

17. Device determining the mass center of inhomogeneous and human non-rigid center

18. Intelligent direction – finder mirrors

19. Full-spinning, ball-bearing crane of columns with two catchers

20. Controlling sleepwalkers by individual relative positioning system

21. Vehicle balance system and prevention from being overturned by pump weights

22. Floating immersed propeller (boat)

23. Design and construction of floating autonomous system (boat)

24. Design and construction of doubled-hull unmanned boat (catamaran) with floating width stabilizer winglets

25. Weakening glass in automobiles

26. Construction of a line following robot

== Presence in social networking websites ==
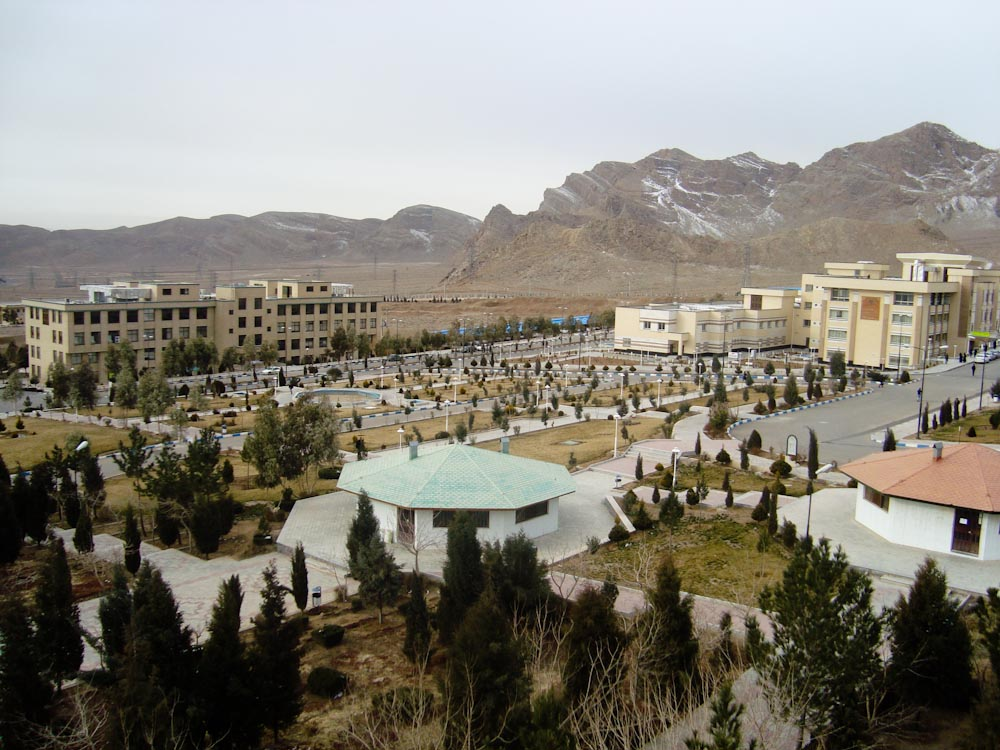
Khomeiny shahr azad university

The university has an unofficial student Instagram page named "IIAUKHSH" which is managed by a group of students and has more than 6500 followers. This group of students also run and manage a Telegram channel name "IIAUKHSH". Both aforementioned page and channels are not confirmed by the university. The university also had official Telegram channels, and the most successful ones were run by "education office" and "public affairs", but after telegram censorship in Iran, an order from the central branch of university to halt all branch activities on Telegram and move to national Iranian messengers, these accounts activity were halted (and as of 13-Oct-2018 will be deleted in a few weeks due to telegram application automatic account termination after a certain period of inactivity).

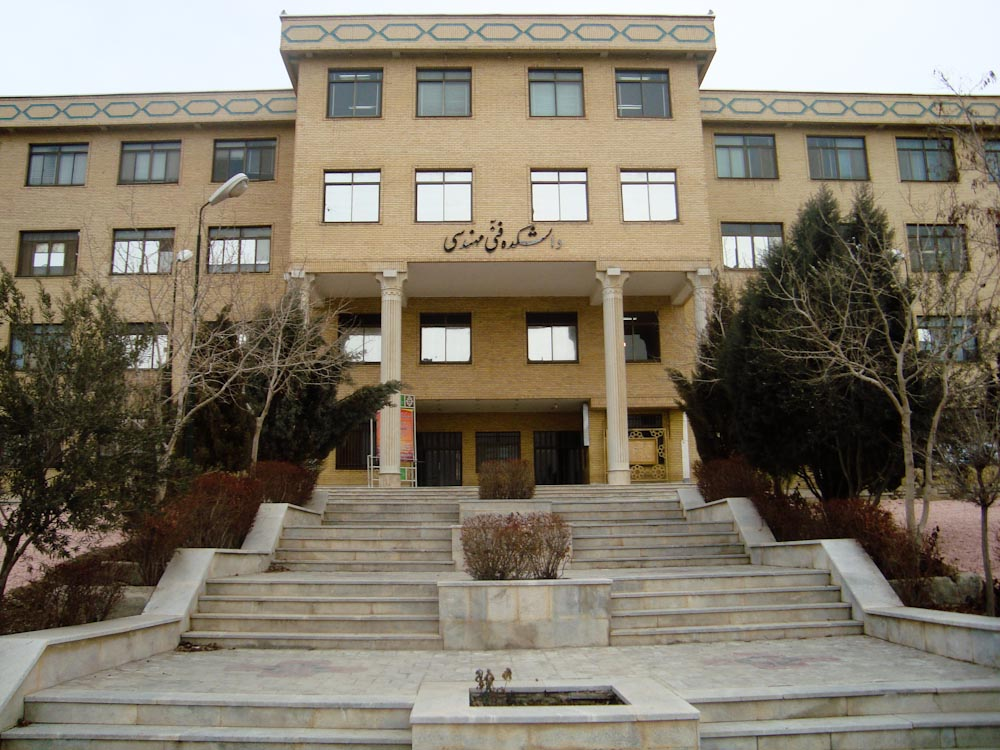

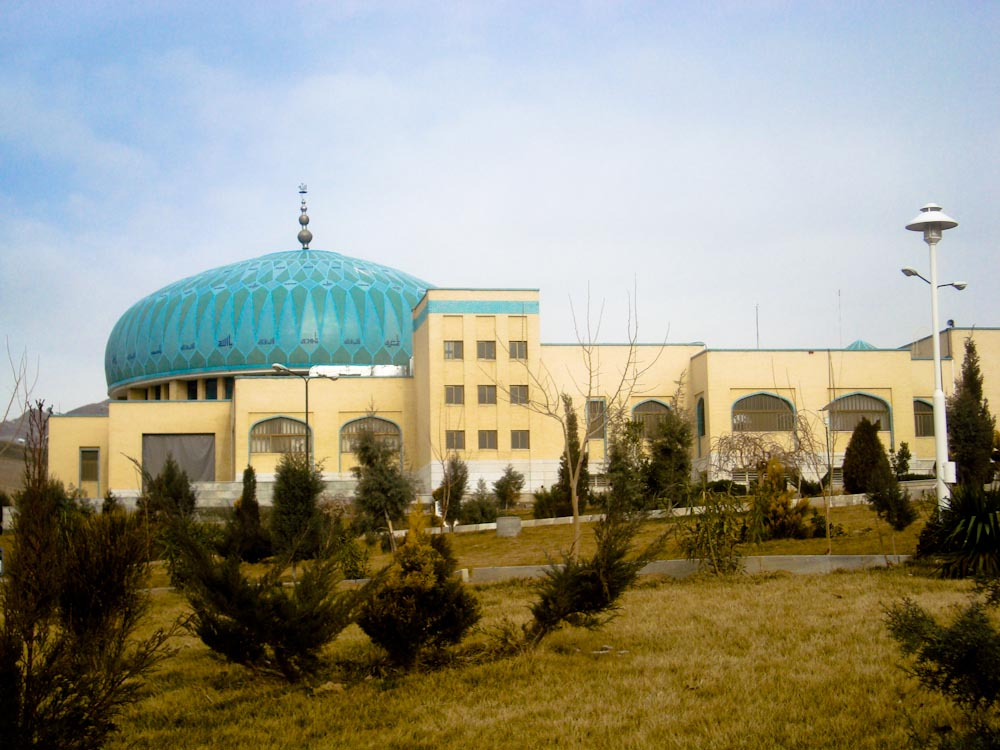

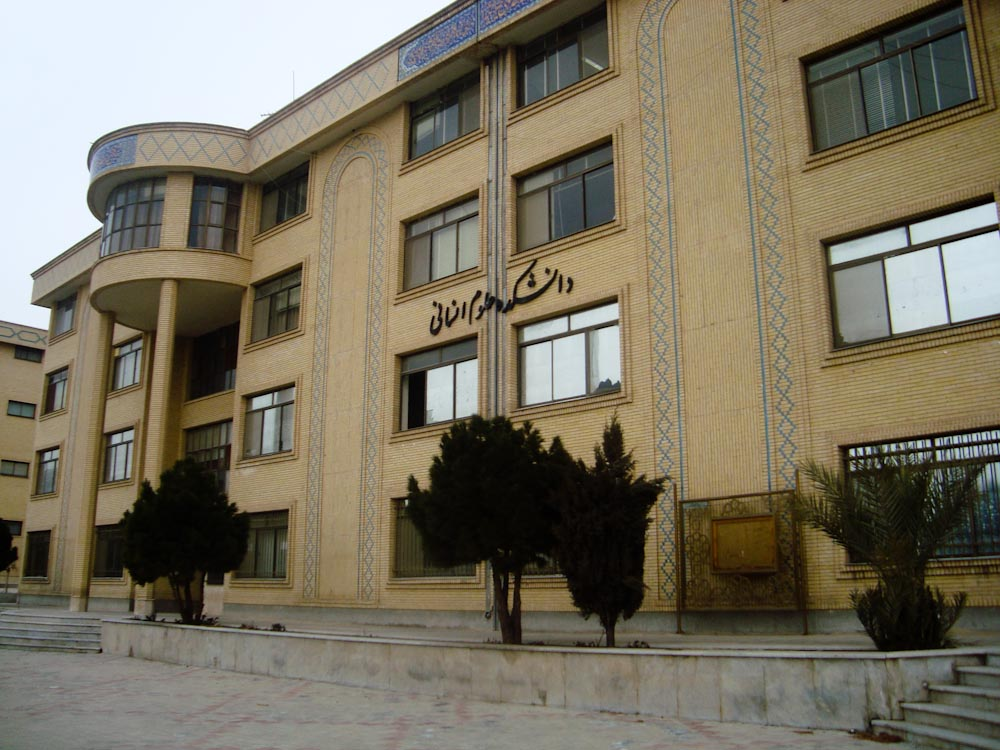

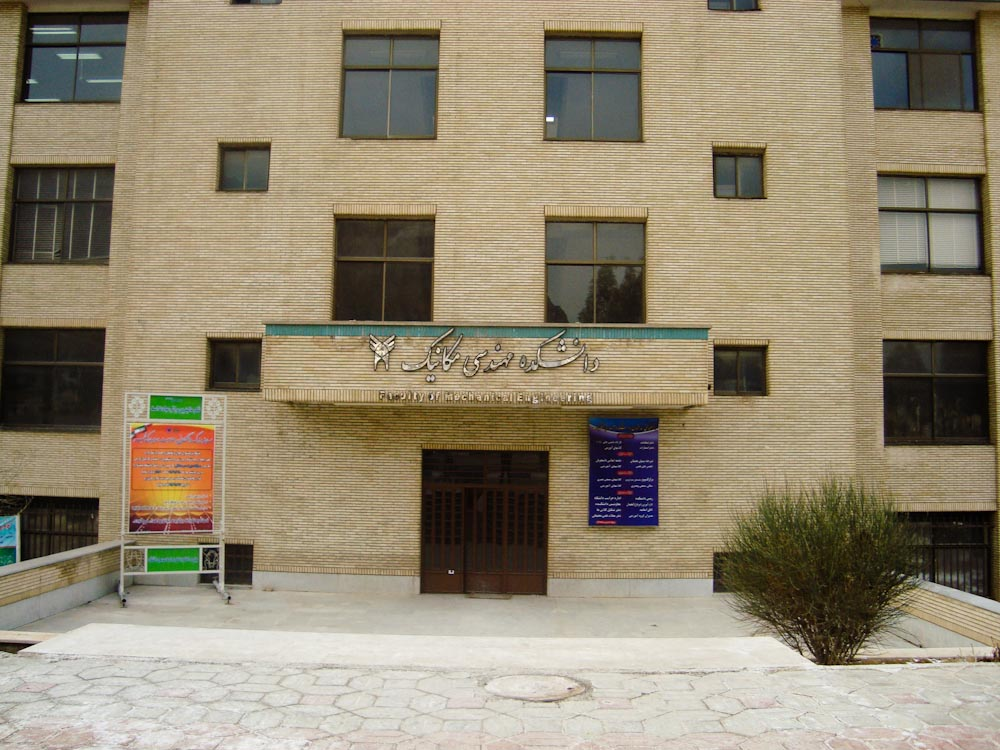

== See also ==
- Higher education in Iran
- List of universities in Iran
- List of Universities in Isfahan Province
