= Shahankuh =

Mountain in Iran

Shahankuh (Persian: شاهان‌کوه, lit. 'King's mountain') is a mountain located about 20 kilometres southwest of the city of Fereydunshahr in the western part of Isfahan province in Iran. With an elevation of 4,040 metres, the Shahankuh is the highest mountain in Isfahan Province. Situated in the Zagros Mountains and stretched in a general northwest–southeast direction and almost parallel to other Zagros mountains, the Shahankuh has an average width of about 3 kilometres and a length of almost 20 kilometres.

== Etymology ==
"Shahankuh" is made up of two words, "shahan" and "kuh". "Shahan" means "kings" and is formed by "shah" meaning "king" and the plural suffix "an", and "kuh" means "mountain". Therefore, "Shahankuh" means the "kings' mountain" in Persian.

== Geology ==
Located in the Sanandaj-Sirjan geologic and structural zone of Iran, the Shahankuh is mainly made of Cretaceous limestones.

== Climatology ==
Being a high mountain, the Shahankuh has a cold mountainous climate with cold winters and cool summers. The average annual temperature is 5 – 10 °C and the average annual precipitation is between 800 and more than 1000 millimetres.

== Plant and animal life ==
Rhubarb, goat's thorn, mountain pistachio, and wild plants are among the various forms of the mountain's vegetation.
