= Islamic Azad University, Meymeh Branch =

The Islamic Azad University, Meymeh Branch is a university in the town of Meymeh in Isfahan Province, Iran. It is a branch of the Islamic Azad University.
