= Zayandehrud, Iran =

City in Isfahan province, Iran

Zayandehrud Persian: زايندهرود
- City
- Location within Iran
- Coordinates: 32°23′21″N 51°16′13″E
- Country: Iran
- Province: Isfahan
- County: Lenjan
- District: Central

Population (2016)
  - Total: 9,463
- Time zone: UTC+3:30 (IRST)

Zayandehrud (Persian: زايندهرود) (Note: Formerly Baba Sheykh Ali (بابا شیخ علی), also romanized as Bābā Sheykh ‘Alī) is a city in the Central District of Lenjan County, Isfahan province, Iran.

== Demographics ==
=== Population ===
At the time of the 2006 National Census, the city's population was 9,891 in 2,715 households. The following census in 2011 counted 9,514 people in 2,827 households. The 2016 census measured the population of the city as 9,463 people in 3,080 households.
