= Badrud =

City in Isfahan province, Iran

Badrud Persian: بادرود
- City
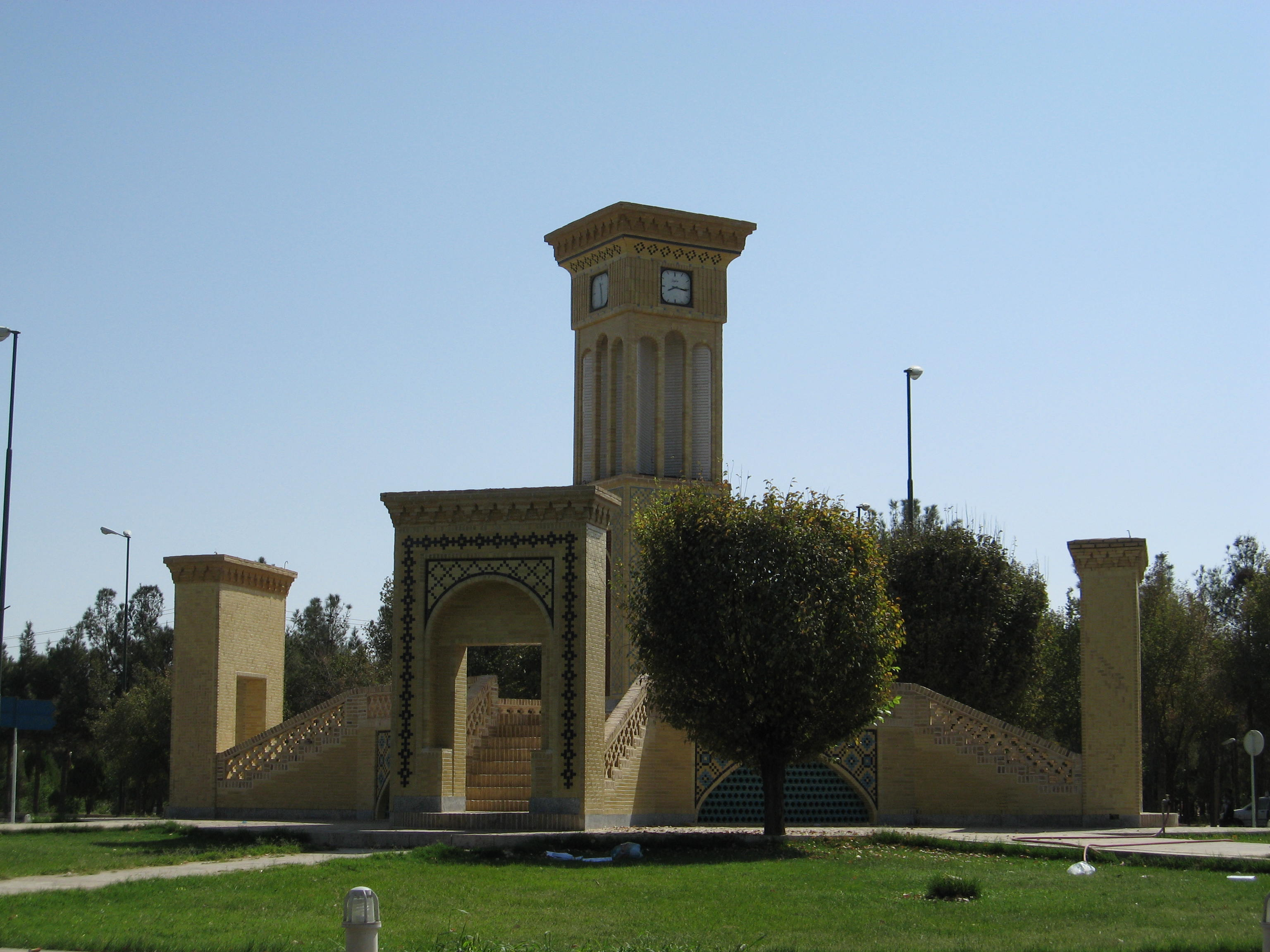
- Main square in Badrud

- Location within Iran
- Coordinates: 33°41′32″N 52°00′04″E
- Country: Iran
- Province: Isfahan
- County: Natanz
- District: Emamzadeh

Population (2016)
  - Total: 14,723
- Time zone: UTC+3:30 (IRST)

Badrud (Persian: بادرود) (Note: Also romanized as Bād Rūd, Badrood, Badroud, and Bādrūd; also known as Bād and Nasran) is a city in, and the capital of, Emamzadeh District in Natanz County, Isfahan province, Iran.

== Demographics ==
=== Population ===
At the time of the 2006 National Census, the city's population was 14,391 in 3,709 households. The following census in 2011 counted 13,120 people in 3,982 households. The 2016 census measured the population of the city as 14,723 people in 4,763 households.
