= Khaledabad, Fars =

Khaledabad خالداباد
- Village
- Location within Iran
- Coordinates: 29°32′18″N 52°52′31″E
- Country: Iran
- Province: Fars
- County: Shiraz
- Bakhsh: Central
- Rural District: Darian

Population (2006)
  - Total: 44
- Time zone: UTC+3:30 (IRST)
  - Summer (DST): UTC+4:30 (IRDT)

Khaledabad (Persian: خالداباد, also Romanized as Khāledābād; also known as Kholdābād) is a village in Darian Rural District, in the Central District of Shiraz County, Fars province, Iran. At the 2006 census, its population was 44, in 18 families.
