= Khaledabad =

City in Isfahan province, Iran

Khaledabad Persian: خالدآباد
- City
- Location within Iran
- Coordinates: 33°42′02″N 51°59′17″E
- Country: Iran
- Province: Isfahan
- County: Natanz
- District: Emamzadeh
- Established as a city: 2004

Population (2016)
  - Total: 3,023
- Time zone: UTC+3:30 (IRST)

Khaledabad (Persian: خالدآباد) (Note: Also romanized as Khāledābād; also known as Khālīābād and Khālidābād) is a city in Emamzadeh District of Natanz County, Isfahan province, Iran, serving as the administrative center for Khaledabad Rural District. The village of Khaledabad was converted to a city in 2004.

== Demographics ==
=== Population ===
At the time of the 2006 National Census, the city's population was 3,308 in 859 households. The following census in 2011 counted 2,756 people in 860 households. The 2016 census measured the population of the city as 3,023 people in 1,034 households.
