= Khaleqabad, Rafsanjan =

Khaleqabad خالق اباد
- Village
- Location within Iran
- Coordinates: 30°28′00″N 56°29′00″E
- Country: Iran
- Province: Kerman
- County: Rafsanjan
- Bakhsh: Central
- Rural District: Khenaman

Population (2006)
  - Total: 34
- Time zone: UTC+3:30 (IRST)
  - Summer (DST): UTC+4:30 (IRDT)

Khaleqabad (Persian: خالق اباد, also Romanized as Khāleqābād; also known as Khāledābād, Khalegh Abad Khanaman, Khaleqābād-e Khenāmān, and Knalīgābād) is a village in Khenaman Rural District, in the Central District of Rafsanjan County, Kerman Province, Iran. At the 2006 census, its population was 34, in 9 families.
