= Varnamkhast =

City in Isfahan province, Iran

Varnamkhast Persian: ورنامخواست
- City
- Location within Iran
- Coordinates: 32°21′25″N 51°22′36″E
- Country: Iran
- Province: Isfahan
- County: Lenjan
- District: Central

Population (2016)
  - Total: 18,700
- Time zone: UTC+3:30 (IRST)

Varnamkhast (Persian: ورنامخواست) (Note: Also romanized as Varnāmkhāst and Varnāmkhvāst) is a city in the Central District of Lenjan County, Isfahan province, Iran.

== Demographics ==
=== Population ===
At the time of the 2006 National Census, the city's population was 15,294 in 3,845 households. The following census in 2011 counted 17,384 people in 5,056 households. The 2016 census measured the population of the city as 18,700 people in 5,774 households.
