= Sedeh Lenjan =

City in Isfahan province, Iran

Sedeh Lenjan Persian: سده لنجان
- City
- Location within Iran
- Coordinates: 32°22′43″N 51°19′04″E
- Country: Iran
- Province: Isfahan
- County: Lenjan
- District: Central

Population (2016)
  - Total: 19,101
- Time zone: UTC+3:30 (IRST)

Sedeh Lenjan (Persian: سده لنجان) (Note: Also romanized as Sedeh Lanjān and Sedeh Lenjān; also known as Sedeh) is a city in the Central District of Lenjan County, Isfahan province, Iran.

== Demographics ==
=== Population ===
At the time of the 2006 National Census, the city's population was 17,335 in 4,167 households. The following census in 2011 counted 18,654 people in 5,149 households. The 2016 census measured the population of the city as 19,101 people in 5,665 households.
