= Chamgardan =

City in Isfahan province, Iran

Chamgordan Persian: چمگردان
- City
- Location within Iran
- Coordinates: 32°23′35″N 51°20′21″E
- Country: Iran
- Province: Isfahan
- County: Lenjan
- District: Central

Population (2016)
  - Total: 15,574
- Time zone: UTC+3:30 (IRST)

Chamgordan (Persian: چمگردان) (Note: Also romanized as Cham Gordān, Cham-e Gordān, Chamgordan (چمگُردان), and Chamgordān; also known as Cham-e Gordūn) is a city in the Central District of Lenjan County, Isfahan province, Iran.

== Demographics ==
=== Population ===
At the time of the 2006 National Census, the city's population was 16,086 in 4,252 households. The following census in 2011 counted 16,219 people in 4,812 households. The 2016 census measured the population of the city as 15,574 people in 5,017 households.
