= Bagh-e Bahadoran =

City in Isfahan province, Iran

Bagh-e Bahadoran Persian: باغ بهادران
- City
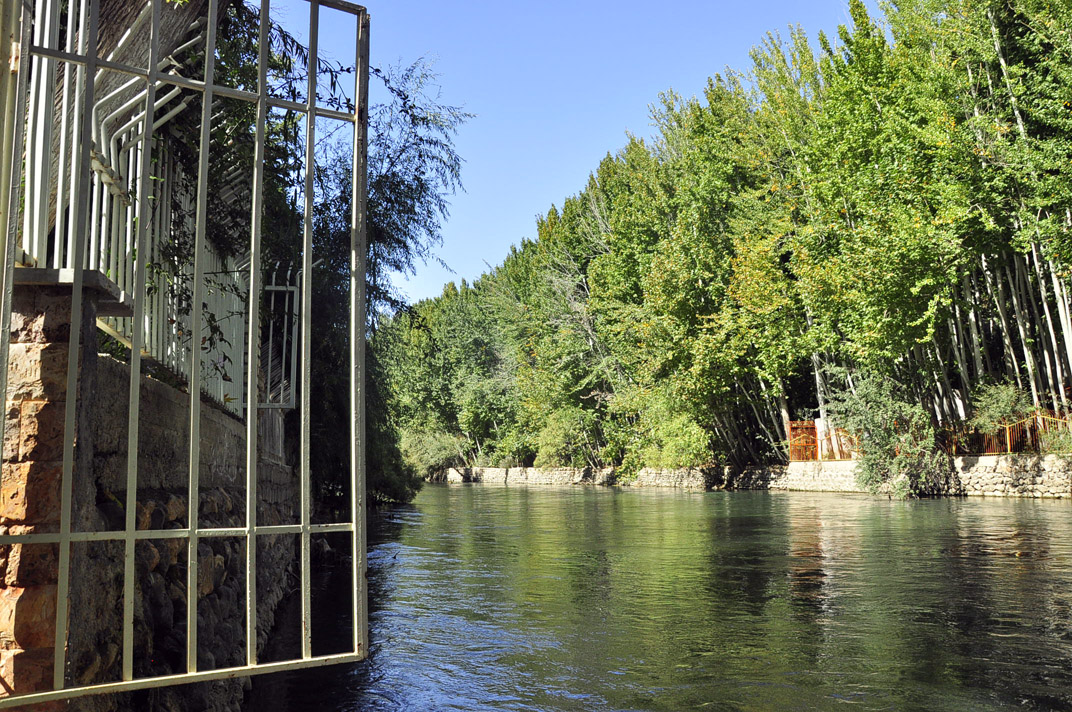
- Zayandeh Rud at the city of Bagh-e Bahadoran

- Location within Iran
- Coordinates: 32°22′32″N 51°11′17″E
- Country: Iran
- Province: Isfahan
- County: Lenjan
- District: Bagh-e Bahadoran

Population (2016)
  - Total: 10,279
- Time zone: UTC+3:30 (IRST)

Bagh-e Bahadoran (Persian: باغ بهادران) (Note: Also known as Bāgh Bādārān, Bāgh Bāderān, Baghbaderan, Bāghbāderān, and Bāghbadorān) is a city in, and the capital of, Bagh-e Bahadoran District in Lenjan County, Isfahan province, Iran.

== Demographics ==
=== Population ===
At the time of the 2006 National Census, the city's population was 8,808 in 2,432 households. The following census in 2011 counted 9,598 people in 2,905 households. The 2016 census measured the population of the city as 10,279 people in 3,238 households.
