= Zarrinshahr =

City in Isfahan province, Iran

Zarrinshahr Persian: زرین‌شهر
- City
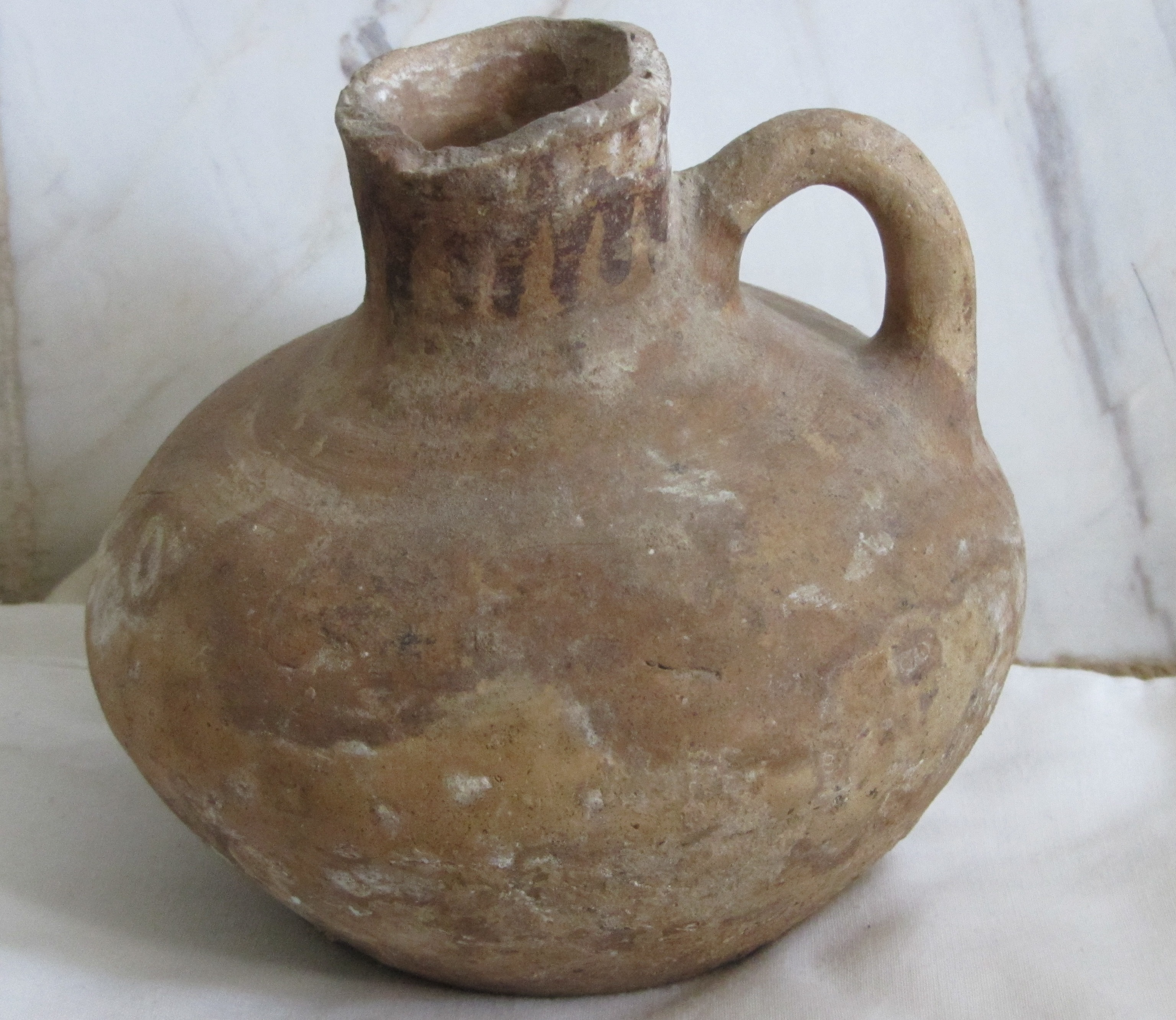
- Ancient pottery of Zarrinshahr

- Location within Iran
- Coordinates: 32°23′20″N 51°22′24″E
- Country: Iran
- Province: Isfahan
- County: Lenjan
- District: Central

Population (2016)
  - Total: 55,817
- Time zone: UTC+3:30 (IRST)

Zarrinshahr (Persian: زرین‌شهر) (Note: Also romanized as Zarīn Shahr and Zarrin Shahr; also known as Qal‘eh Rīz, Rīz, and Rīz-e Lanjān) is a city in the Central District of Lenjan County, Isfahan province, Iran, serving as capital of both the county and the district. It is in the southwest of the county.

== Etymology ==
Until the 1970s Zarrinshahr was known as Riz-e Lenjan (or simply Riz for the locals). The name changed to Zarrinshahr.

== History ==
The center of Lenjan County was renamed Zarrinshahr due to nearby Zayandeh Rud (Zayandeh River) in 1936, according to the resolution of the Riz City Council, inspired by the ancient name of Zarrin Rud. Archaeologists consider the objects discovered in the Bagh-e Mahmud, Bagh-e Deraz, and Kafr Hills south of the city and adjacent to the ancient Riz stream, to have come from a few ancient hills along the Zayandeh Rud route, historically contemporaneous with the Silk Road civilization of Kashan.

== Demographics ==
=== Population ===
At the time of the 2006 National Census, the city's population was 55,984 in 15,154 households. The following census in 2011 counted 60,118 people in 17,920 households. The 2016 census measured the population of the city as 55,817 people in 17,821 households.

== Geography and climate ==
Zarrinshahr is located in the lush plain of the Zayandeh Rood (or Zayandeh River), not too far from the Zagros mountain range. The climate is temperate, the four seasons occur regularly and are clearly differentiated. It experiences a few snowfalls a year but not much rain. Summer is hot and temperatures can hit 36 on some days. Summer however is quite pleasant due to lack of humidity and low temperatures at night. The locals often hit the riverside at night for dinner or after dinner tea.

== Culture ==
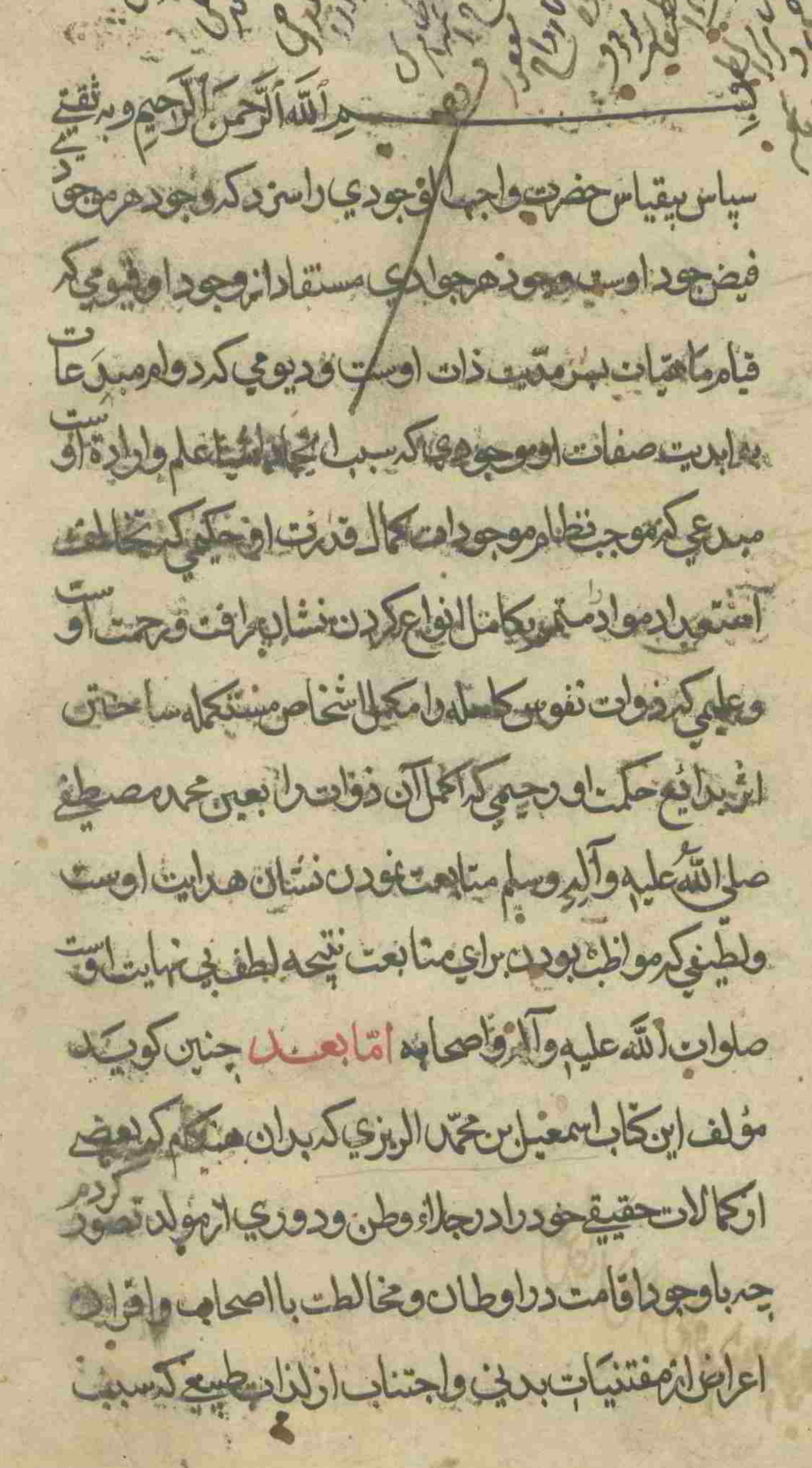
The first page of the book Hayat al-Nufus written by Ismail ibn Muhammad al-Rizī in the 7th century AH

Expatriate Zohreh Bayatrizi describes the city as multi-cultural. The two main groups are Persians, who have lived in the area at least since 12th century AD, and Azeri Turks, who were forcibly settled in Riz in the 17th century by the Safavid rulers.

In the past 30 years people from various parts of Iran have moved to Zarrinshahr to work in the nearby steel mill factory (zobe ahan). The single largest immigrant group are Bakhtiaris from the nearby province of Chaharmahal and Bakhtiari. The second largest group are from Khuzestan after the onset of the Iran–Iraq War in 1980. Most of the latter were placed in camps just outside the city and most returned home after the ceasefire.

== Sports ==
Zarrinshahr has Greco-Roman wrestling and martial arts teams that are competitive nationally.

== Notable people ==
Ismail bin Mohammad Rizi: Author of the book Hayat al-Nufus on Eastern philosophy between 673 and 675 AH, a copy of which is available in Tehran University Library with retrieval number 1.2.4.

Zain al-Abidin Rizi: Scribe of the documents of al-Ahkam fi Sharh Shariah al-Islam on Monday, 26 Rabi al-Awwal 1061 AH, which is available in the library of Ibn Maskawayh under retrieval number 2857.

Mohammad Moghim Rizi: Al-Fawaid scribe in the date of Shawwal 1042 AH, which is available in the library of Ayatollah Murashi Najafi under retrieval number 1/3028

== Gallery ==
Nature of Zarrinshahr

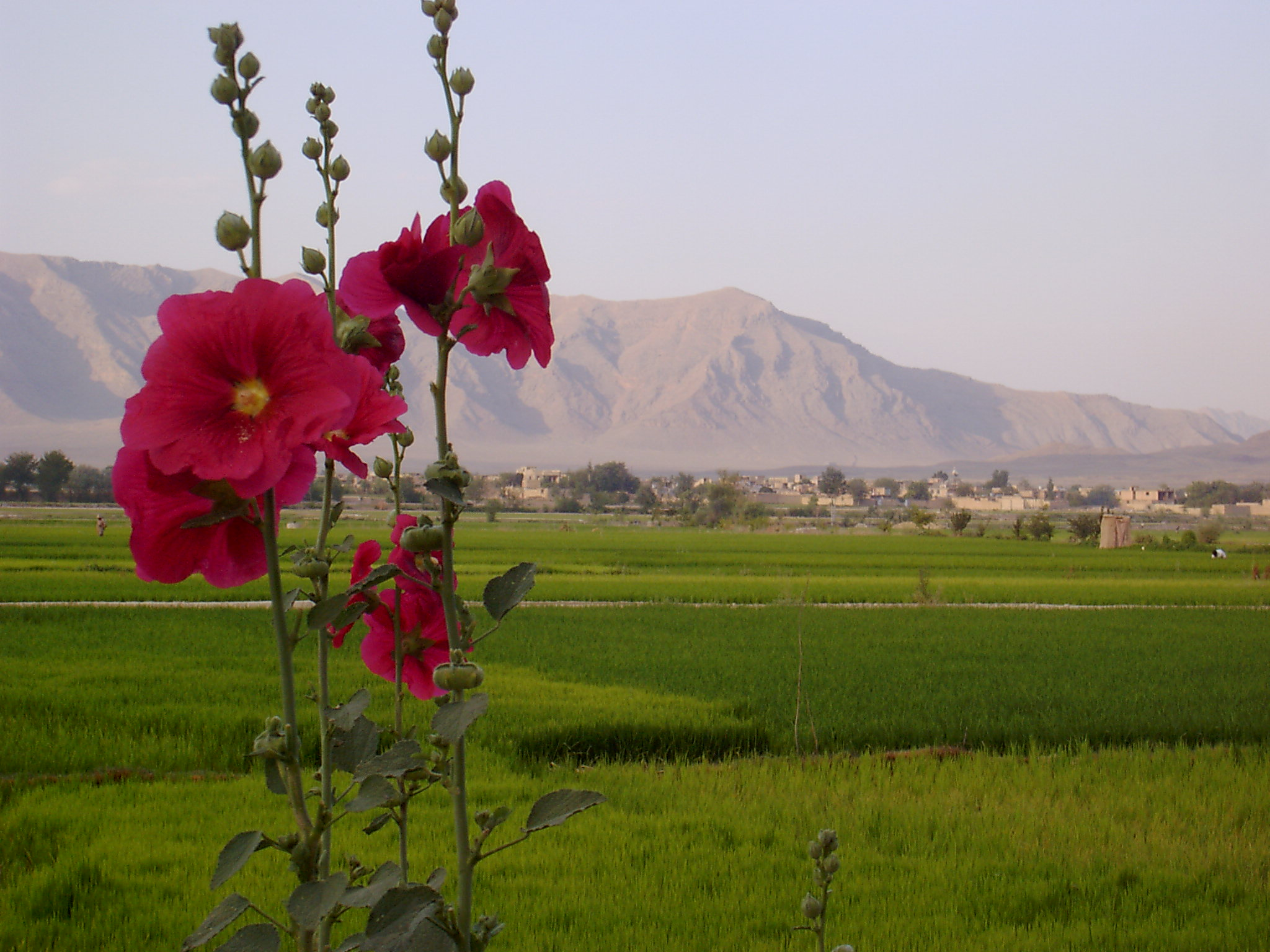

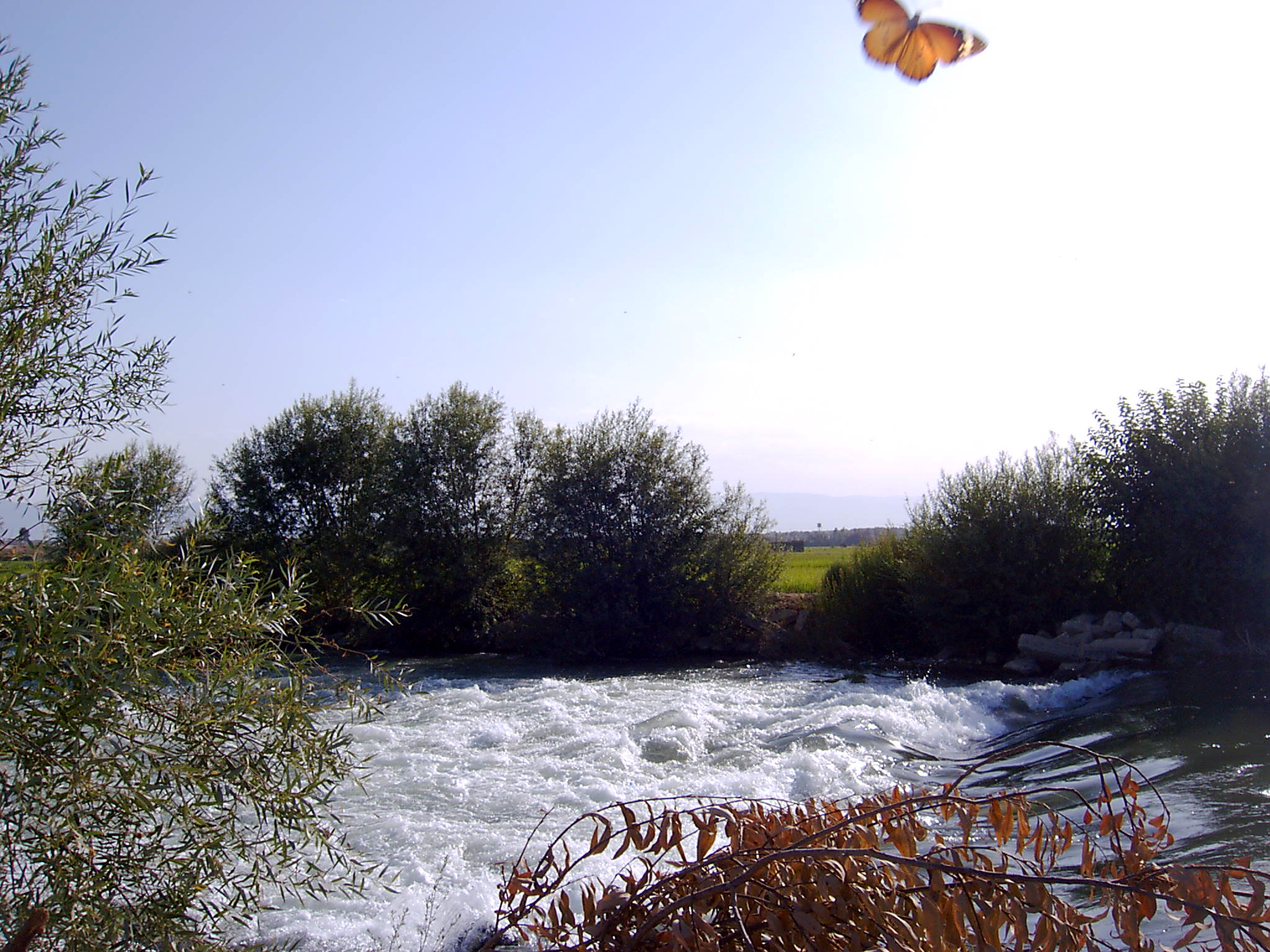

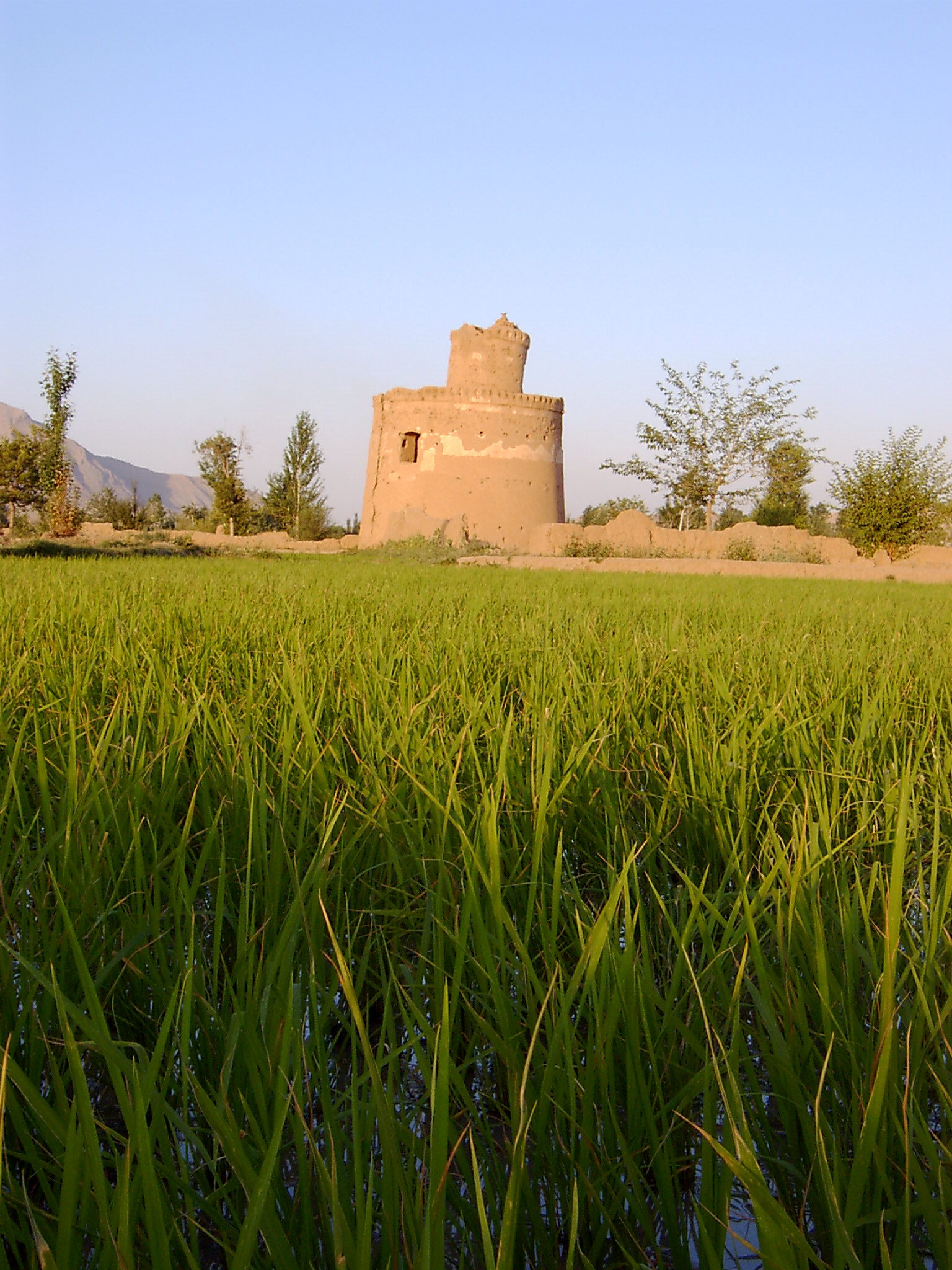

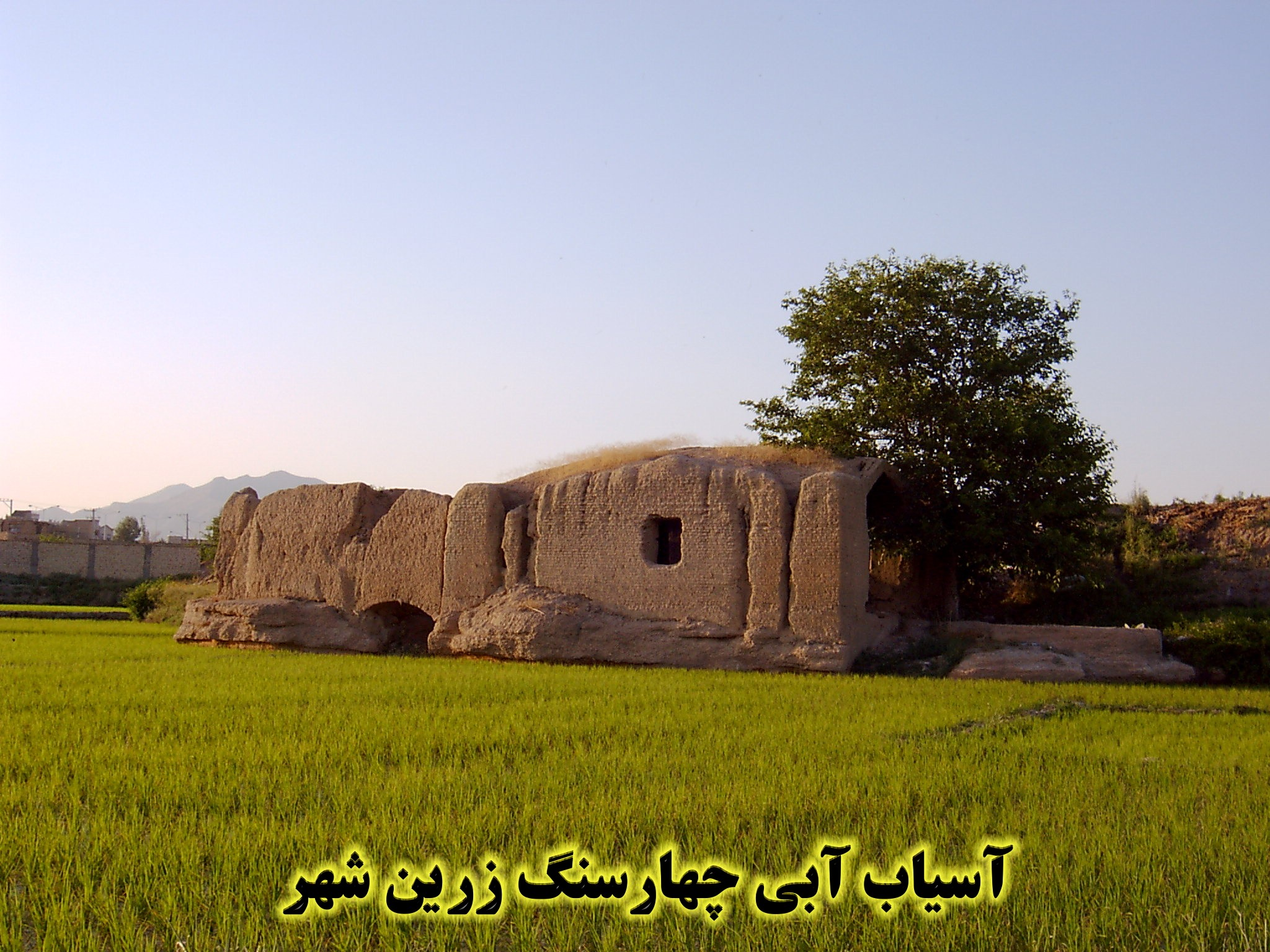

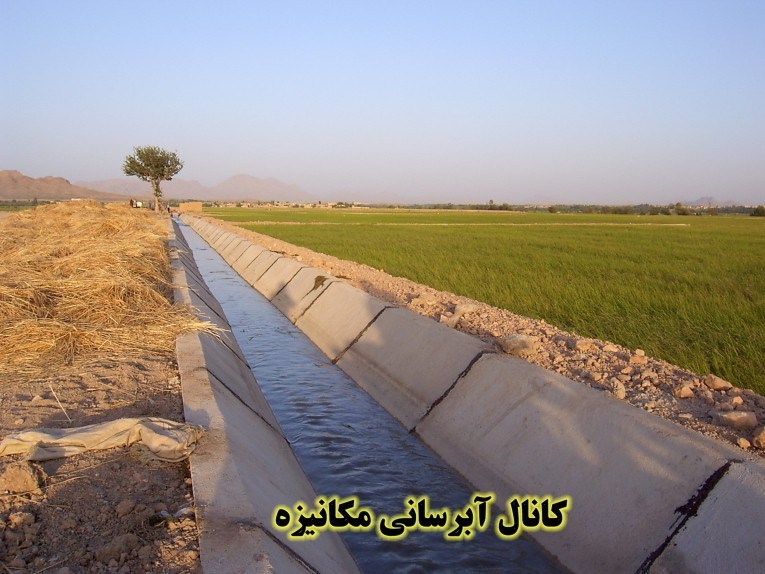

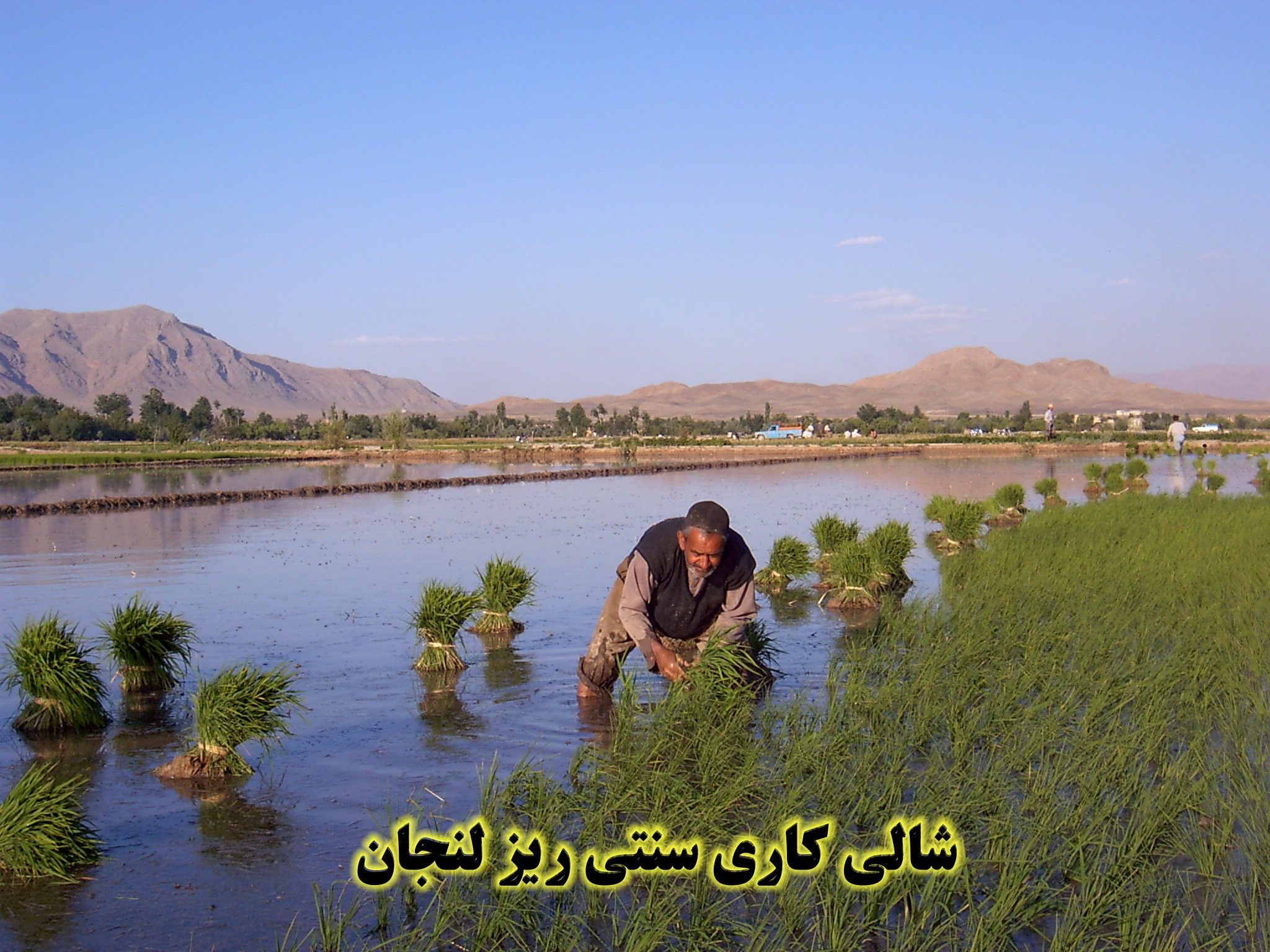

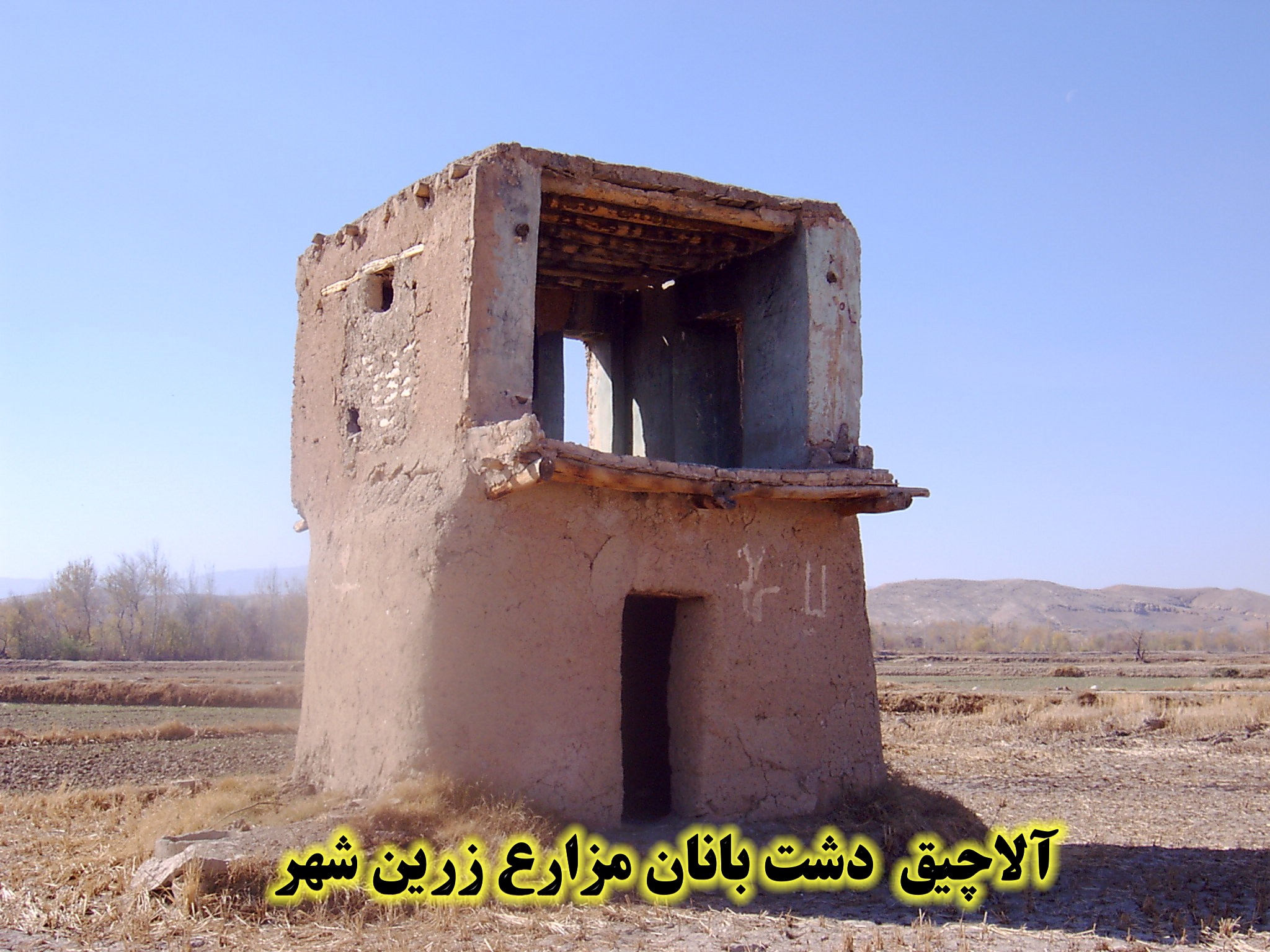

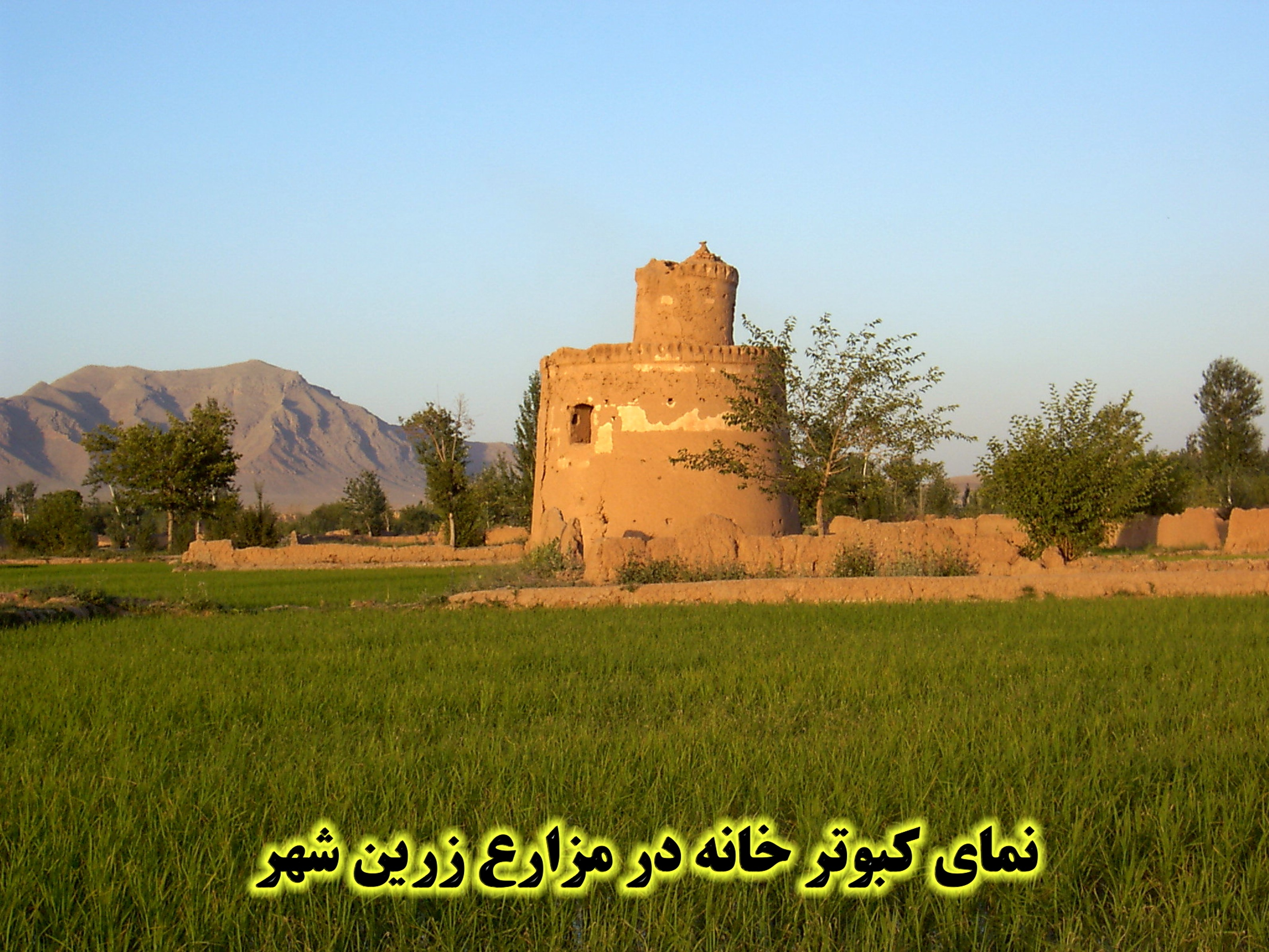

== See also ==
Media related to Zarrin Shahr at Wikimedia Commons
