= Emamzadeh District =

District in Isfahan province, Iran

Emamzadeh District Persian: بخش امامزاده
- District
- Location within Iran
- Coordinates: 33°46′N 52°04′E
- Country: Iran
- Province: Isfahan
- County: Natanz
- Established: 1999
- Capital: Badrud

Population (2016)
  - Total: 23,745
- Time zone: UTC+3:30 (IRST)

Emamzadeh District (Persian: بخش امامزاده) is in Natanz County, Isfahan province, Iran. Its capital is the city of Badrud.

== Demographics ==
=== Population ===
At the time of the 2006 National Census, the district's population was 23,211 in 5,994 households. The following census in 2011 counted 21,473 people in 6,449 households. The 2016 census measured the population of the district as 23,745 inhabitants in 7,774 households.

=== Administrative divisions ===
Emamzadeh District Population
Administrative Divisions	2006	2011	2016
Emamzadeh Aqaali Abbas RD	2,174	2,304	2,654
Khaledabad RD	3,338	3,293	3,345
Badrud (city)	14,391	13,120	14,723
Khaledabad (city)	3,308	2,756	3,023
Total	23,211	21,473	23,745
RD = Rural District
