= Isfahan province =

Province of Iran

Isfahan province استان اصفهان (Persian)
- Province
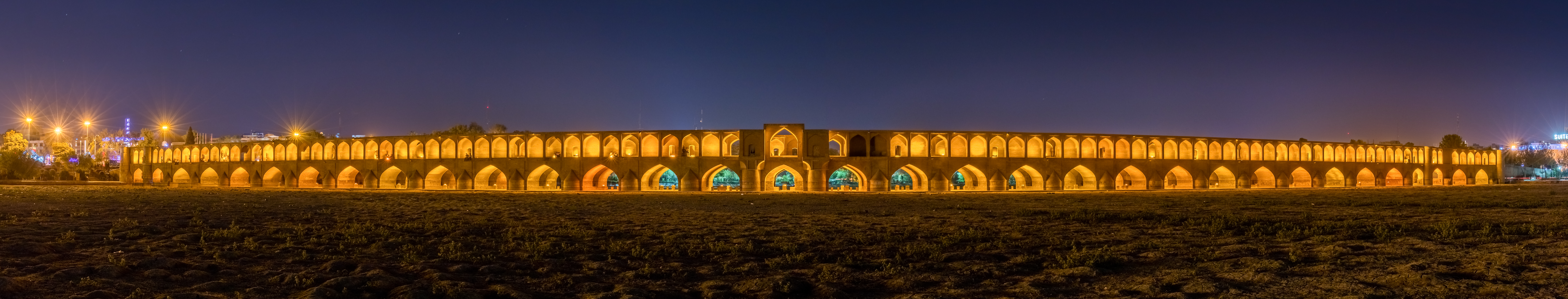
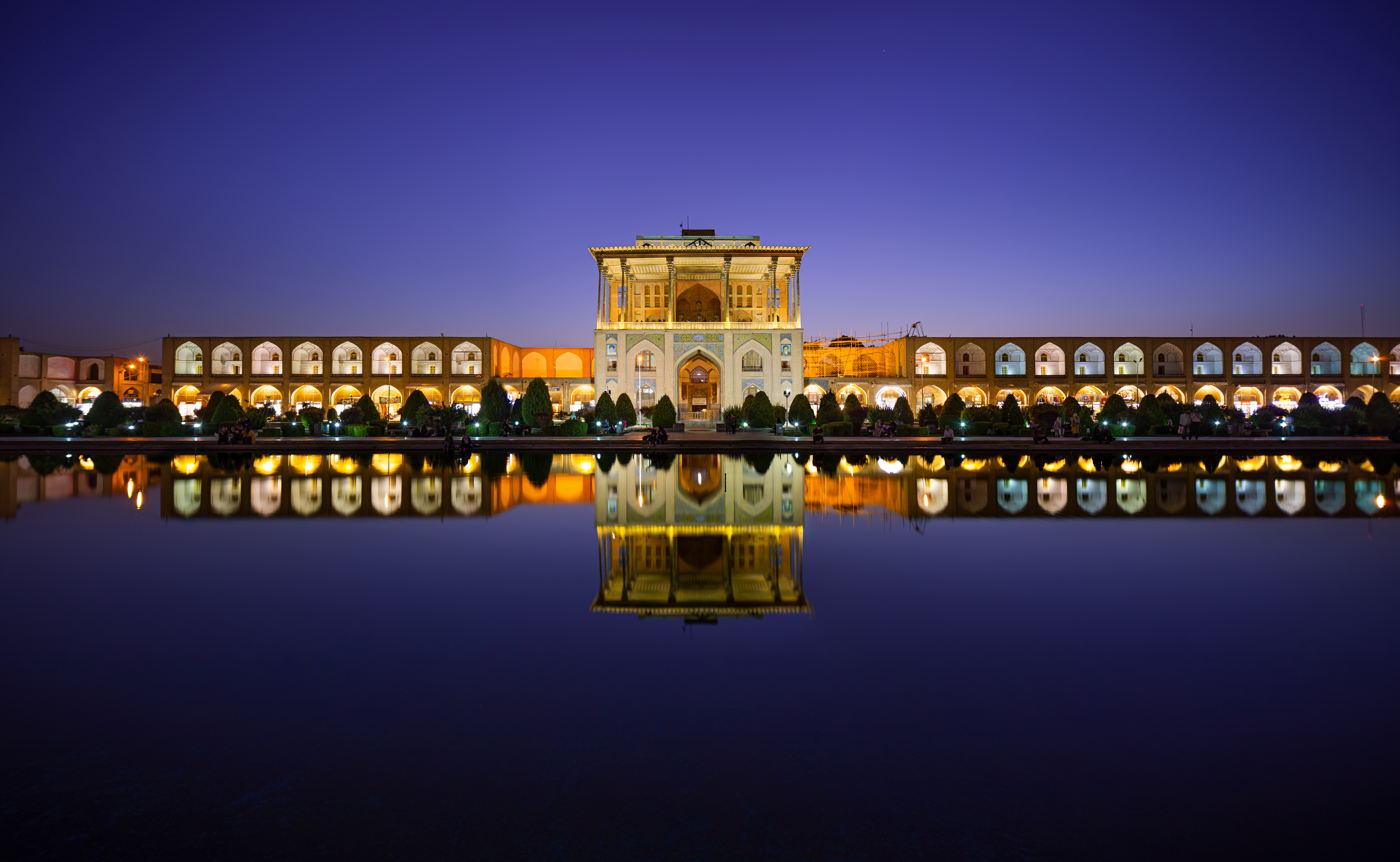
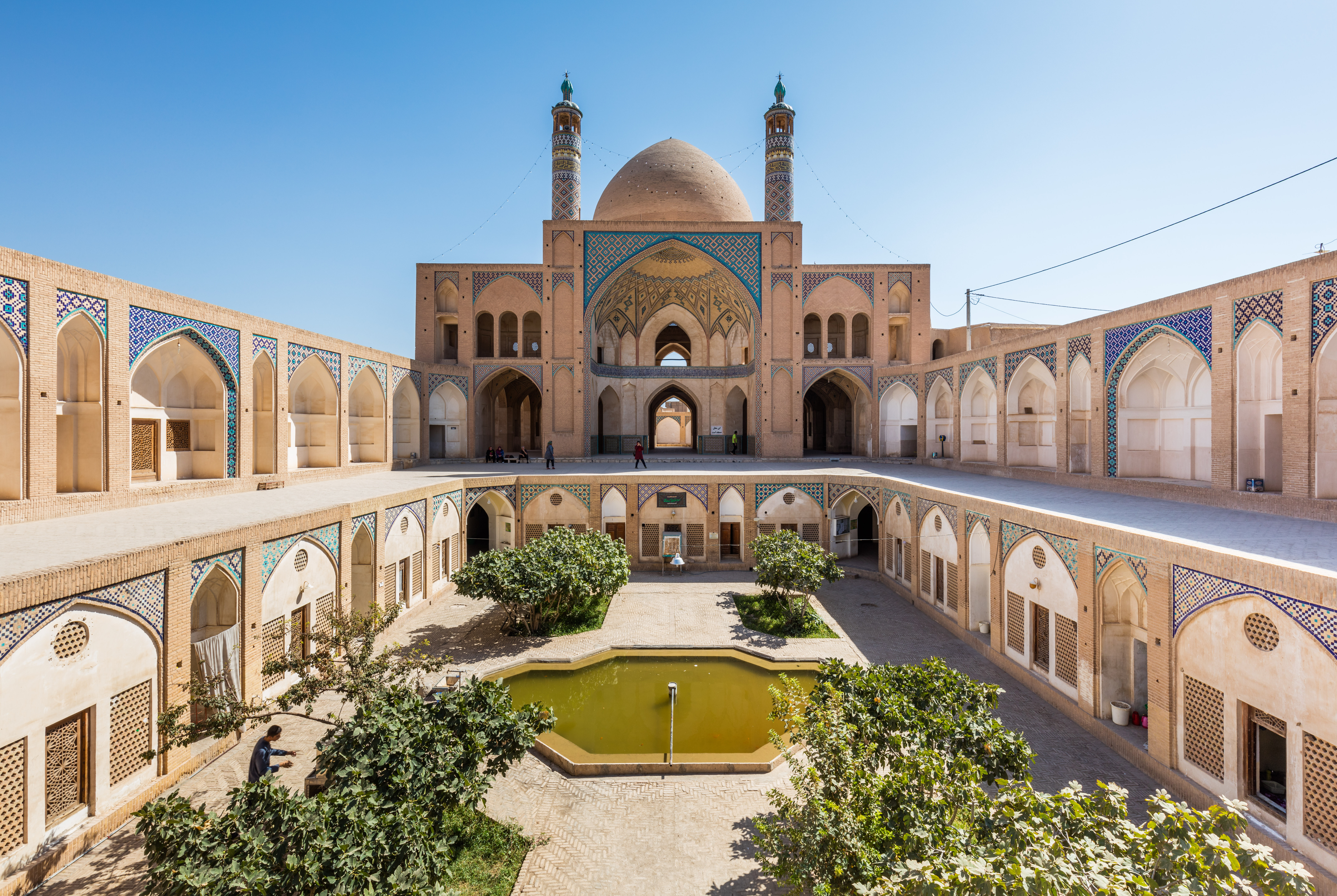
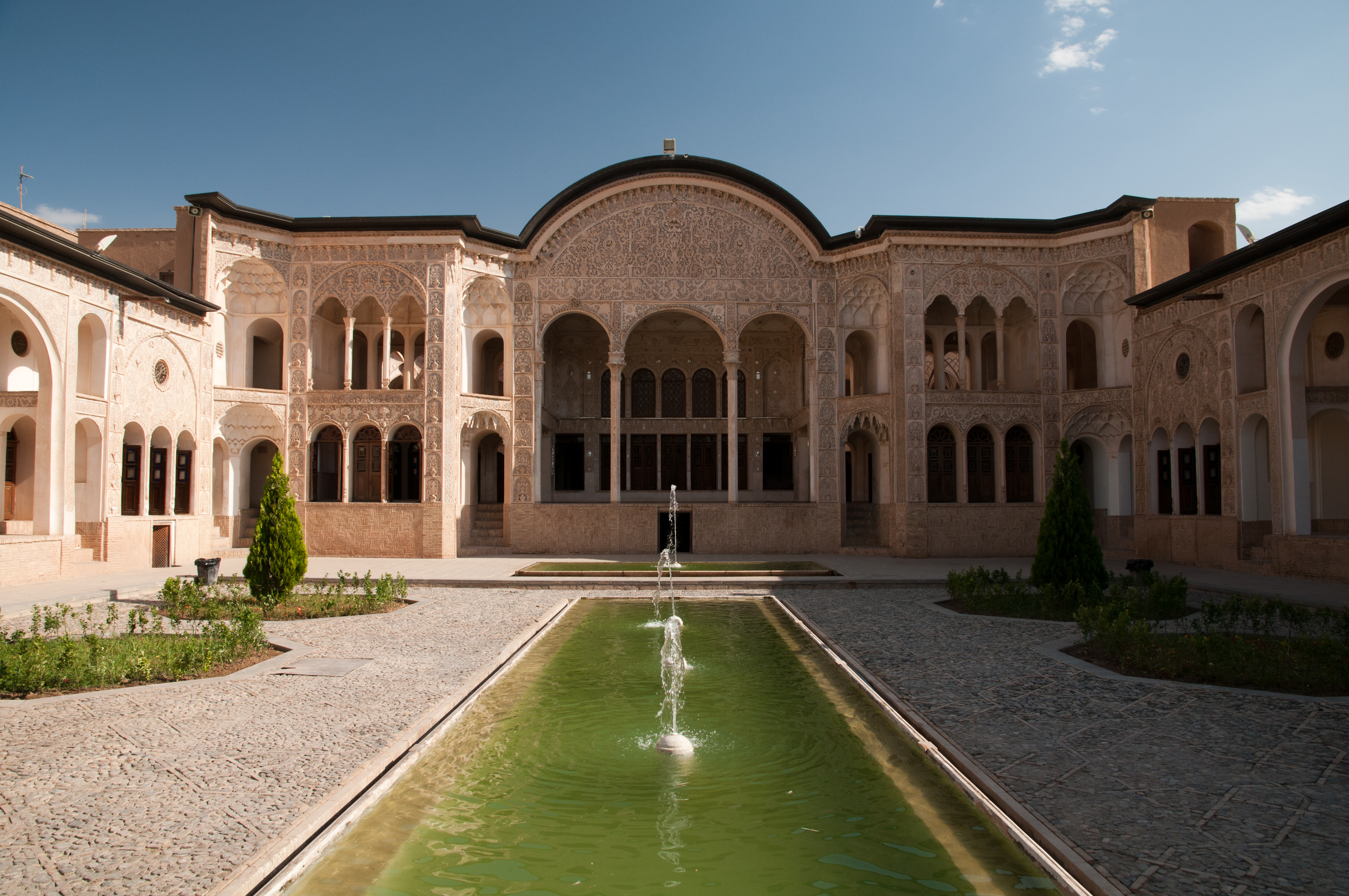
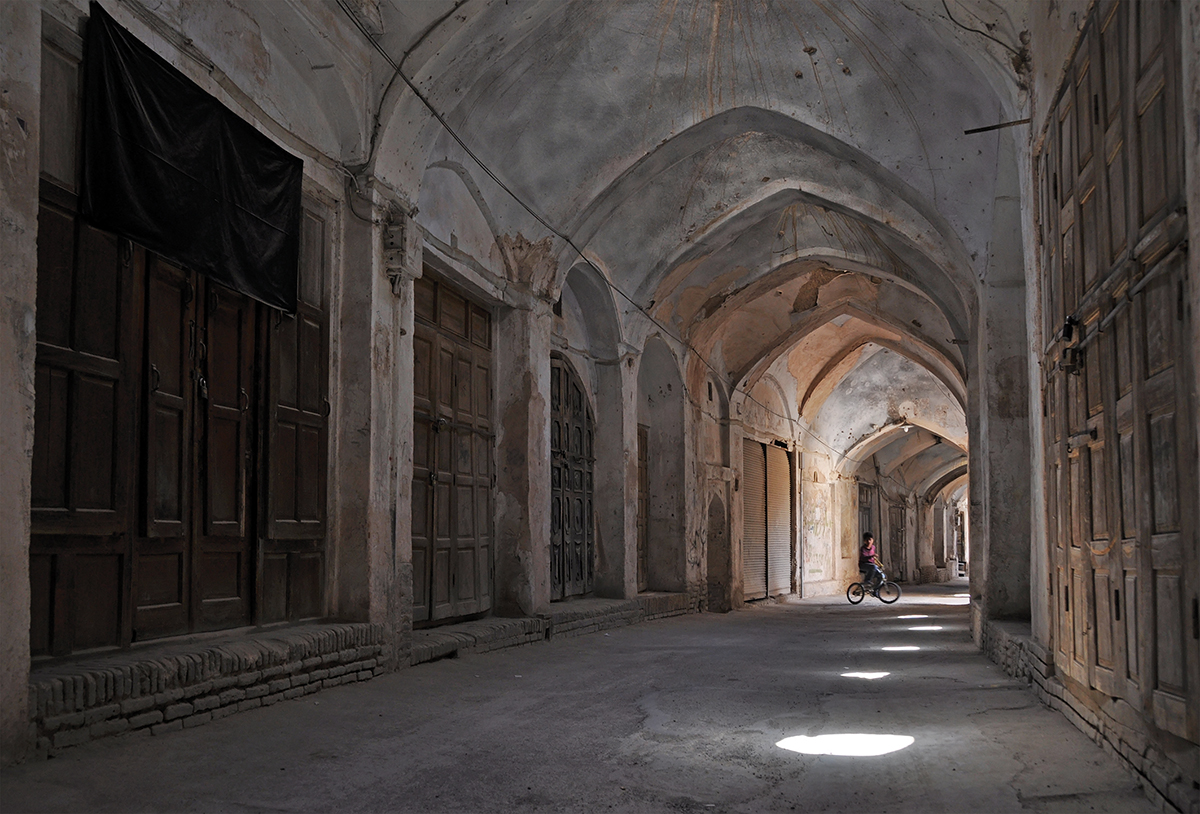

- Location of Isfahan province within Iran
- Coordinates: 32°40′N 51°55′E
- Country: Iran
- Region: Region 2
- Capital: Isfahan
- Counties: 29

Government
  - Governor-general: Mehdi Jamalinejad (Principlist)

Area
  - Total: 107,018 km^{2} (41,320 sq mi)

Population (2016)
  - Total: 5,120,850
  - Estimate (2020): 5,343,000
  - Rank: 3rd
  - Density: 47.8504/km^{2} (123.932/sq mi)
- Time zone: UTC+03:30 (IRST)
- Area code: 031
- Main language(s): Predominantly Persian. small Minority: Bakhtiari Luri, Qashqai, Georgian, Armenian languages in some regions of the province
- HDI (2017): 0.830 very high · 3rd
- Website: www.ostan-es.ir

Isfahan province Historical population
Year	Pop.	±%
1966	1,703,701	—
1986	3,294,916	+93.4%
2006	4,559,256	+38.4%
2011	4,879,312	+7.0%
2016	5,120,850	+5.0%
amar.org.ir

Isfahan province (Persian: استان اصفهان) (Note: Also romanized as Ostān-e Esfahān, Esfahan, Espahan, or Isphahan) is one of the 31 provinces of Iran. Its capital is the city of Isfahan.

The province is in the center of the country in Iran's Region 2, whose secretariat is located in Isfahan.

Isfahan Province is located along the eastern foothills of the Zagros Mountains. It covers both mountainous terrain and arid plains, contributing to its diverse climate and natural resources.

== History ==
Historians have recorded Espahan, Sepahan or Isfahan initially as a defense and military base. Historical castles were Atashgah, Sarooyieh, Tabarok, Kohan Dej, and Gard Dej. The oldest is Ghal'eh Sefeed and the grounds at Tamijan from prehistoric times. The historic village of Abyaneh, a nationwide attraction, also has Sasanian ruins and fire temples among other historical relics.

During the 17th and 18th centuries, Isfahan province became the capital of Safavid Iran. While the city of Sepahan (Esfahan) was their seat of monarchical, Kashan was their place of vacation and leisure.

== Demographics ==
=== Language ===
First language in Isfahan province
1. Persian (79.5%)
2. Luri (6.83%)
3. Turkic (5.82%)
4. Central Plateau Group (3.39%)
5. Georgian (0.30%)
6. Biyabanaki (0.07%)
7. Armenian (0.04%)
8. Other, unknown (4.05%)

A majority of the population speak Persian as first language with a minority of Luri, Turkic, Georgian, Biyabanaki and Armenian speakers.

During the Pahlavi era, a large group of Kurds from the Gulbaghi tribe were moved from the north of Kurdistan province to the city of Isfahan and the cities of Yazd, Kashan, and Nayin. Today, the Gulbaghi tribe are mostly assimilated elements in the population of these cities.

=== Population ===
At the time of the 2006 National Census, the province's population was 4,499,327 in 1,223,684 households, with a literacy rate of 88.65 percent. The following census in 2011 counted 4,879,312 people in 1,454,162 households. The 2016 census measured the population of the province as 5,120,850 in 1,607,482 households.

=== Administrative divisions ===

The population history and structural changes of Isfahan province's administrative divisions over three consecutive censuses are shown in the following table.

Isfahan province
Counties	2006	2011	2016
Aran and Bidgol	89,961	97,409	103,517
Ardestan	43,585	41,405	42,105
Borkhar (Note: Separated from Borkhar and Meymeh County after the 2006 census)	–	108,933	122,419
Buin Miandasht (Note: Separated from Faridan County after the 2011 census)	–	–	24,163
Chadegan	33,684	33,942	32,479
Dehaqan	34,149	34,844	34,511
Falavarjan	232,019	247,014	249,814
Faridan	81,622	79,743	49,890
Fereydunshahr	38,955	38,334	35,654
Golpayegan	82,601	87,479	90,086
Harand (Note: Separated from Isfahan County after the 2016 census)	–	–	—
Isfahan	1,963,315	2,174,172	2,243,249
Jarqavieh (Note: Separated from Isfahan County after the 2016 census)	–	–	—
Kashan	297,000	323,371	364,482
Khansar	31,542	32,423	33,049
Khomeynishahr	282,888	311,629	319,727
Khur and Biabanak (Note: Separated from Nain County after the 2006 census)	–	17,793	19,761
Kuhpayeh (Note: Separated from Isfahan County after the 2016 census)	–	–	—
Lenjan	225,559	246,510	262,912
Meymeh and Vazvan (Note: Separated from Shahinshahr and Meymeh County after the 2016 census)	–	–	—
Mobarakeh	132,925	143,474	150,441
Nain	54,298	38,077	39,261
Najafabad	279,014	300,288	319,205
Natanz	43,947	42,239	43,977
Semirom	70,735	65,047	74,109
Shahinshahr (Note: Formerly Borkhar and Meymeh County and then Shahinshahr and Meymeh County)	277,783	196,584	234,667
Shahreza	139,702	149,555	159,797
Tiran and Karvan	64,043	69,047	71,575
Varzaneh	–	–	—
Total	4,499,327	4,879,312	5,120,850

=== Cities ===
According to the 2016 census, 4,507,430 people (over 88% of the population of Isfahan province) live in the following cities:

City	Population
Abrisham	22,429
Abuzeydabad	5,976
Afus	3,696
Alavijeh	8,067
Anarak	1,903
Aran and Bidgol	65,404
Ardestan	15,744
Asgaran	4,858
Asgharabad	6,876
Badrud	14,723
Bafran	1,978
Bagh-e Bahadoran	10,279
Bagh-e Shad	4,356
Baharan Shahr	11,284
Baharestan	79,023
Barf Anbar	5,382
Barzok	4,588
Buin Miandasht	9,889
Chadegan	9,924
Chamgardan	15,574
Chermahin	13,732
Damaneh	4,366
Daran	20,078
Dastgerd	17,775
Dehaq	8,272
Dehaqan	17,945
Dizicheh	18,935
Dorcheh Piaz	47,800
Dowlatabad	40,945
Ezhiyeh	3,156
Falavarjan	37,704
Farrokhi	2,968
Fereydunshahr	13,603
Fuladshahr	88,426
Gaz	24,433
Goldasht	25,235
Golpayegan	58,936
Golshahr	9,904
Golshan	5,437
Gorgab	9,690
Guged	6,012
Habibabad	9,491
Hana	4,922
Harand	7,829
Hasanabad	4,478
Imanshahr	14,633
Isfahan	1,961,260
Jandaq	4,665
Jowsheqan-e Qali	4,181
Jowzdan	6,998
Kamu va Chugan	2,434
Karkevand	7,058
Kahriz Sang	10,442
Kashan	304,487
Kelishad va Sudarjan	25,635
Khaledabad	3,023
Khansar	21,883
Khomeynishahr	247,128
Khur	6,765
Komeshcheh	5,100
Khvorzuq	29,154
Komeh	2,305
Kuhpayeh	5,518
Kushk	13,248
Lay Bid	1,832
Mahabad	3,727
Majlesi	9,363
Manzariyeh	7,164
Meshkat	5,357
Meymeh	5,651
Mobarakeh	69,449
Mohammadabad	5,032
Nain	27,379
Najafabad	235,281
Nasrabad	6,425
Natanz	14,122
Neyasar	2,319
Nikabad	4,364
Nushabad	11,838
Pir Bakran	13,469
Qahderijan	34,226
Qahjavarestan	9,712
Qamsar	3,877
Rezvanshahr	3,606
Rozveh	4,332
Sagzi	5,063
Sedeh Lenjan	19,101
Sefidshahr	5,804
Semirom	26,942
Shahinshahr	173,329
Shapurabad	5,915
Shahreza	134,952
Sin	5,495
Talkhuncheh	9,924
Tarq Rud	1,749
Tiran	21,703
Tudeshk	4,275
Vanak	1,665
Varnamkhast	18,700
Varzaneh	12,714
Vazvan	5,952
Zarrin Shahr	55,817
Zavareh	8,320
Zayandeh Rud	9,463
Zazeran	7,962
Ziar	3,918
Zibashahr	10,200

== Geography ==
The Isfahan province covers an area of approximately 107,018 square km and is situated in the center of Iran. To its north, stand the Markazi (Central) Province and the provinces of Qom and Semnan. To its south, it is bordered by the provinces of Fars, and Kohgiluyeh and Boyer-Ahmad province. Aminabad is the most southern city of Isfahan province just 2 km north of the border. To the east, it is bordered by the province of Yazd. To the west, it shares its border with the province of Lurestan and to the southwest lies the province of Chahar Mahal and Bakhtiyari.

The province experiences a moderate and dry climate on the whole, ranging between 40.6 °C (105.08 °F) and 10.6 °C (51 °F) on a cold day in the winter season. The average annual temperature has been recorded as 16.7 °C (62 °F) and the annual rainfall on average has been reported as 116.9 mm. The city of Sepahan (Esfahan) however experiences an excellent climate, with four distinct seasons.

With an elevation of 4,040 metres, the Shahankuh is the highest peak in Isfahan province. This mountain is located about 20 kilometres southwest of the city of Fereydunshahr in the western part of the province.

Isfahan province has 52 rivers, mostly small and temporary, with the exception of the Zāyanderud, which totals 405 km in length a basin area of 27,100 km2.

=== Biodiversity ===
Esmaeilius isfahanensis (Farsi: کپوردندان_اصفهان) is a species of Cyprinodontid fish endemic to the Zayandehrud river basin (see genus Esmaeilius). It is known only from three sites across the province. Allium chlorotepalum is an endemic species of Isfahan province, Astragalus vernaculus is also common in the west of the province.

== Modern economy ==
Nine tons of saffron are produced by this province by the year.

It is the biggest milk and dairy producer in Iran.

=== High tech ===
The state has 18k active fiber optically connected network ports as of mid 2023.

=== Military ===
Iranian armed forces and the Islamic Republic military has several locations inside Isfahan province, There is also Esfahan nuclear fuel research and production center nfrpc. Hesa specializes in aerospace and helicopter maintenance and weaponry.

=== Tourism ===
==== Bridges ====
Main Isfahan attractions include

- Shahrestan bridge
- Khajoo (Khaju) Bridge in Isfahan
- siosepol or Si-O-Se-Pol bridge
- Choobi Bridge (Joubi Bridge)

== Cuisine ==
According to the Isfahan atlas, well-known local dishes include Shefte, Kachi, Kebab Golpayegan, Samanu Shahreza, Carrot stew Khansar, Yokhe bread (Kaak) and Semirom.

== Education ==
As of 2023, fifty thousand foreigners were studying in schools in Isfahan province.

=== Public universities ===
- Isfahan University of Technology
- Isfahan University
- Isfahan University of Medical Sciences
- Kashan University of Medical Sciences
- Isfahan University of Art
- Malek-Ashtar University of Technology
- University of Kashan

=== Islamic Azad Universities ===
Several well-known Islamic Azad University campuses in Iran are located in the province:

- Islamic Azad University of Falavarjan
- Islamic Azad University of Meymeh
- Islamic Azad University of Kashan
- Islamic Azad University of Majlesi
- Islamic Azad University of Shahreza
- Islamic Azad University of Najafabad
- Islamic Azad University of Khomeynishahr
- Islamic Azad University of Isfahan
- Islamic Azad University of Khorasgan

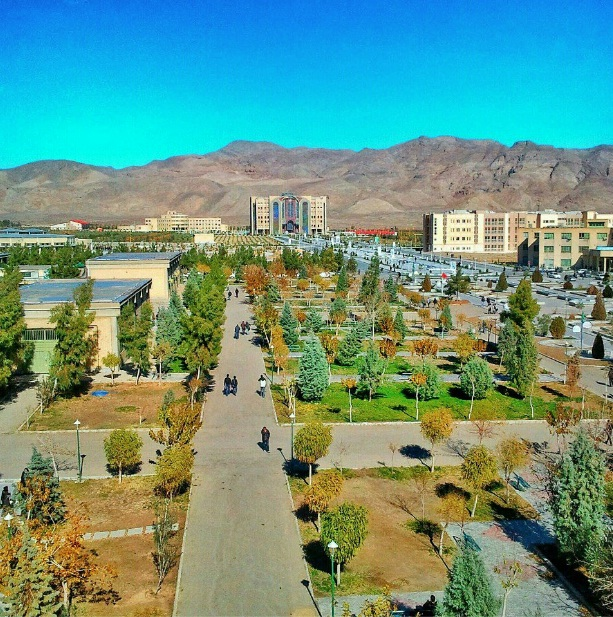
Islamic Azad University of Najafabad has the largest university campus in the Middle East

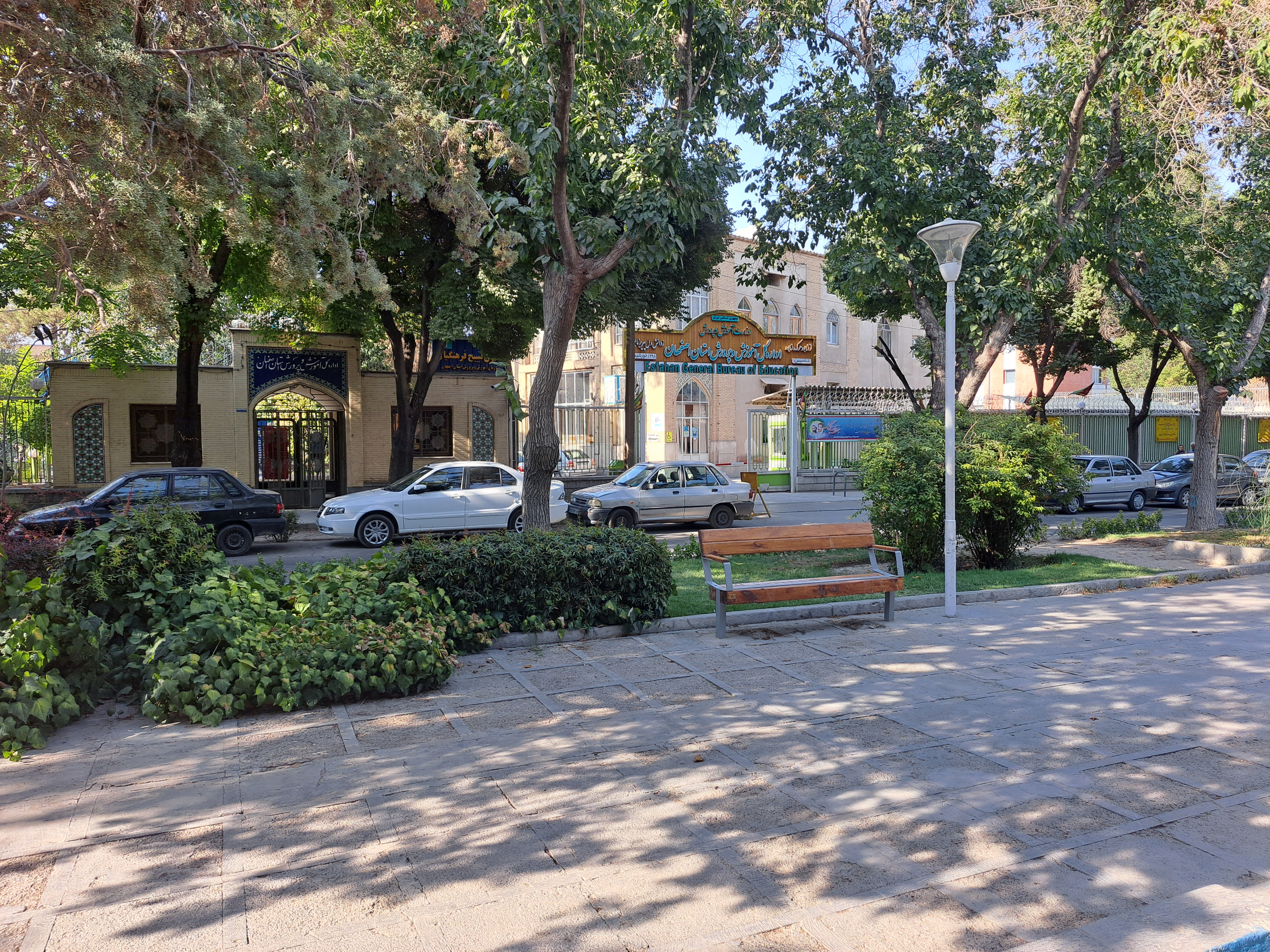
Esfahan general bureau of education

== Gallery ==
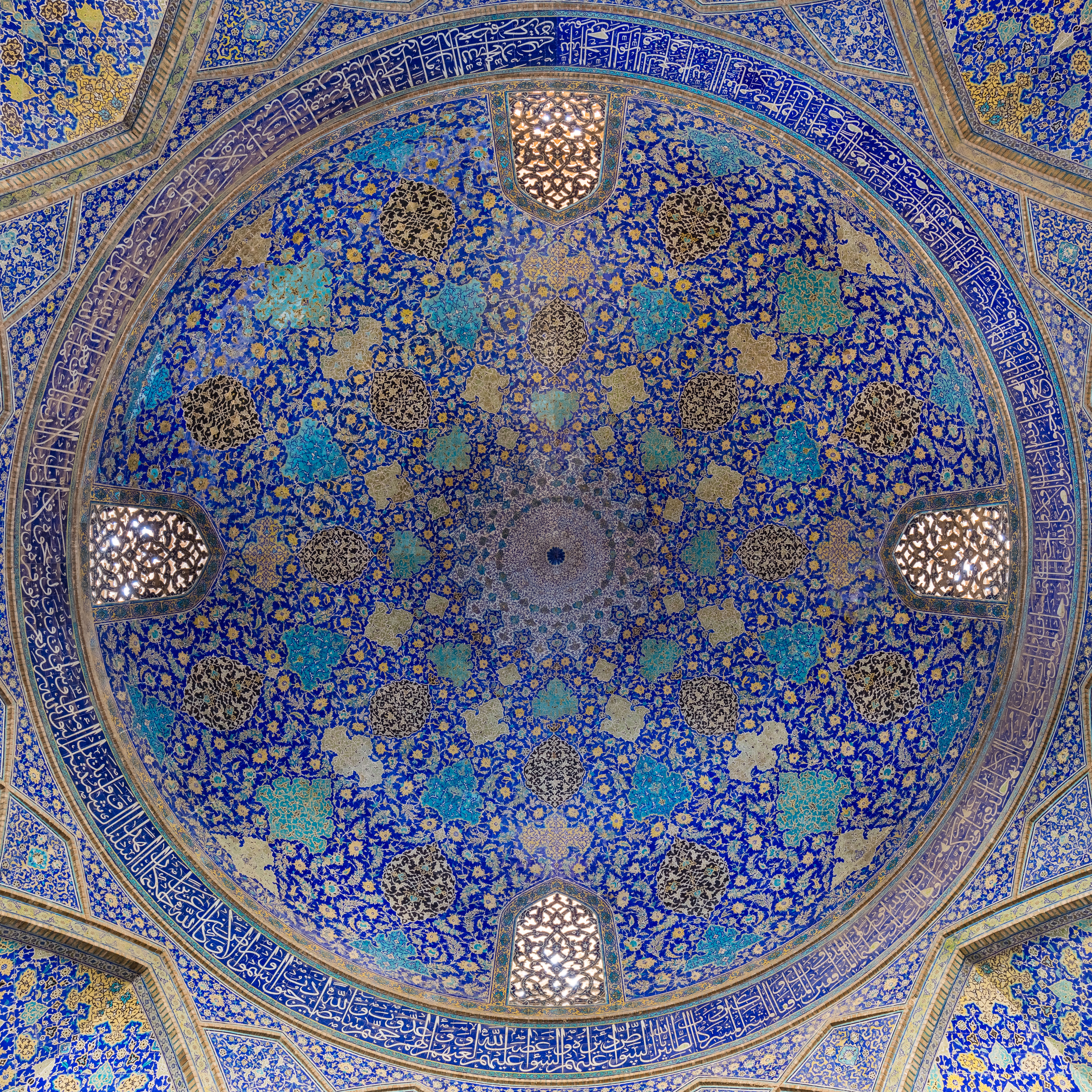
The Dome of Shah Mosque, Isfahan

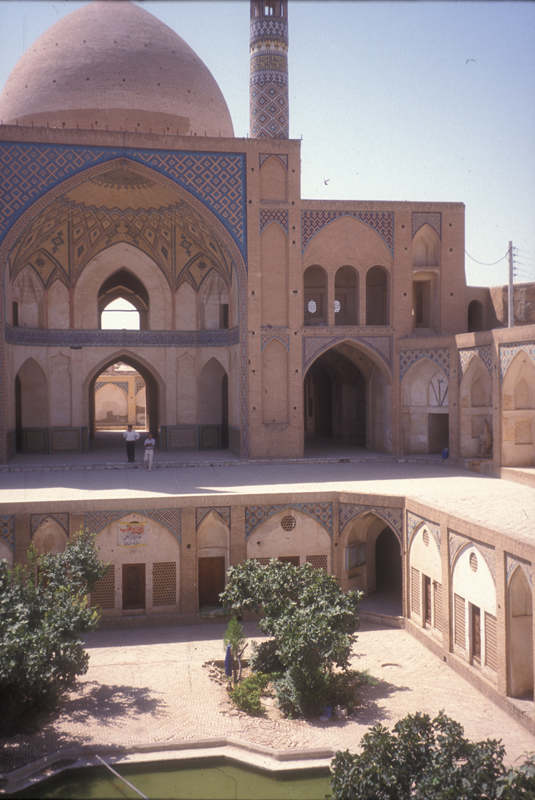
Kashan is another cultural jewel of the province. Seen here is the Agha Bozorg Mosque.

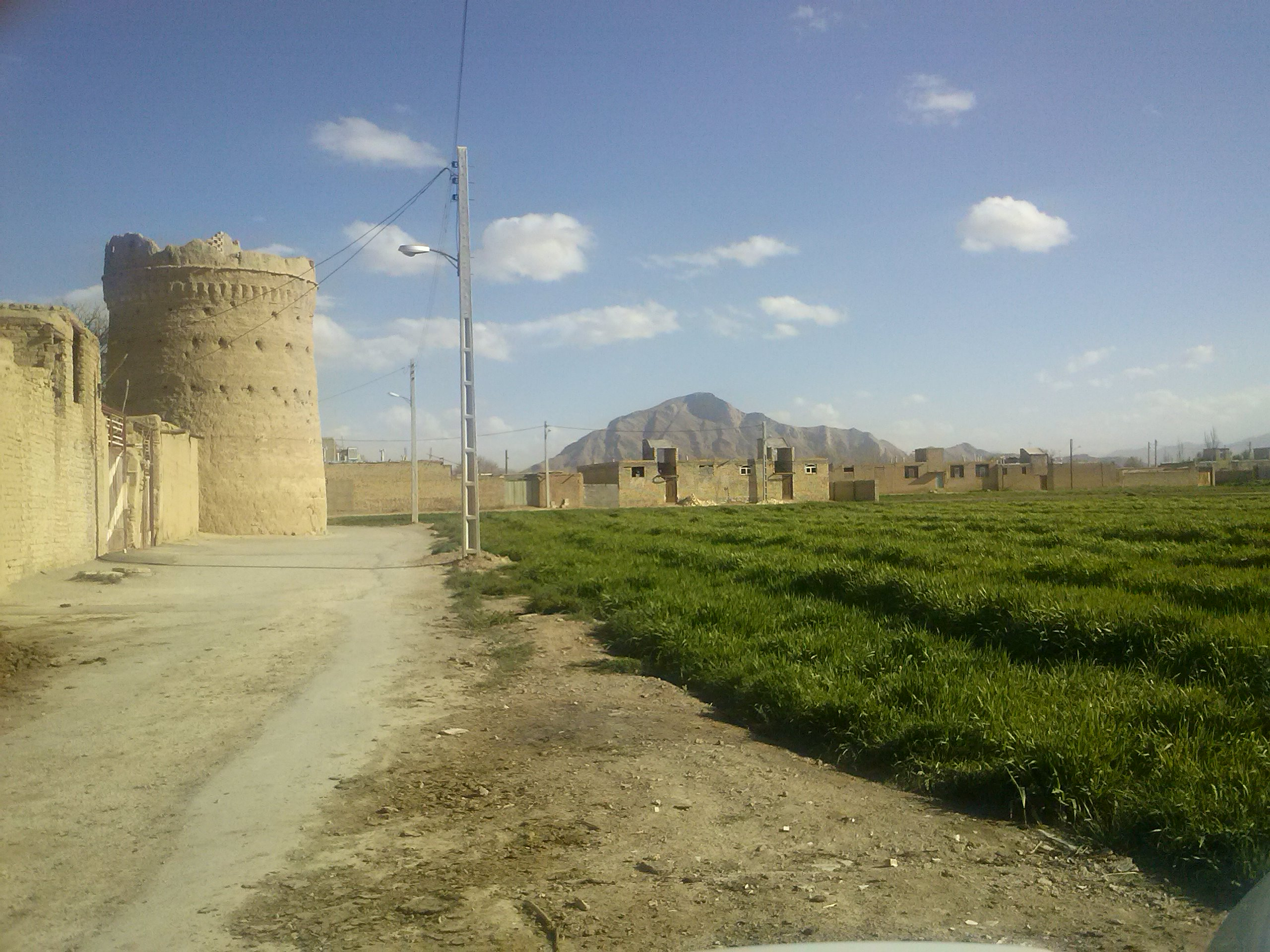

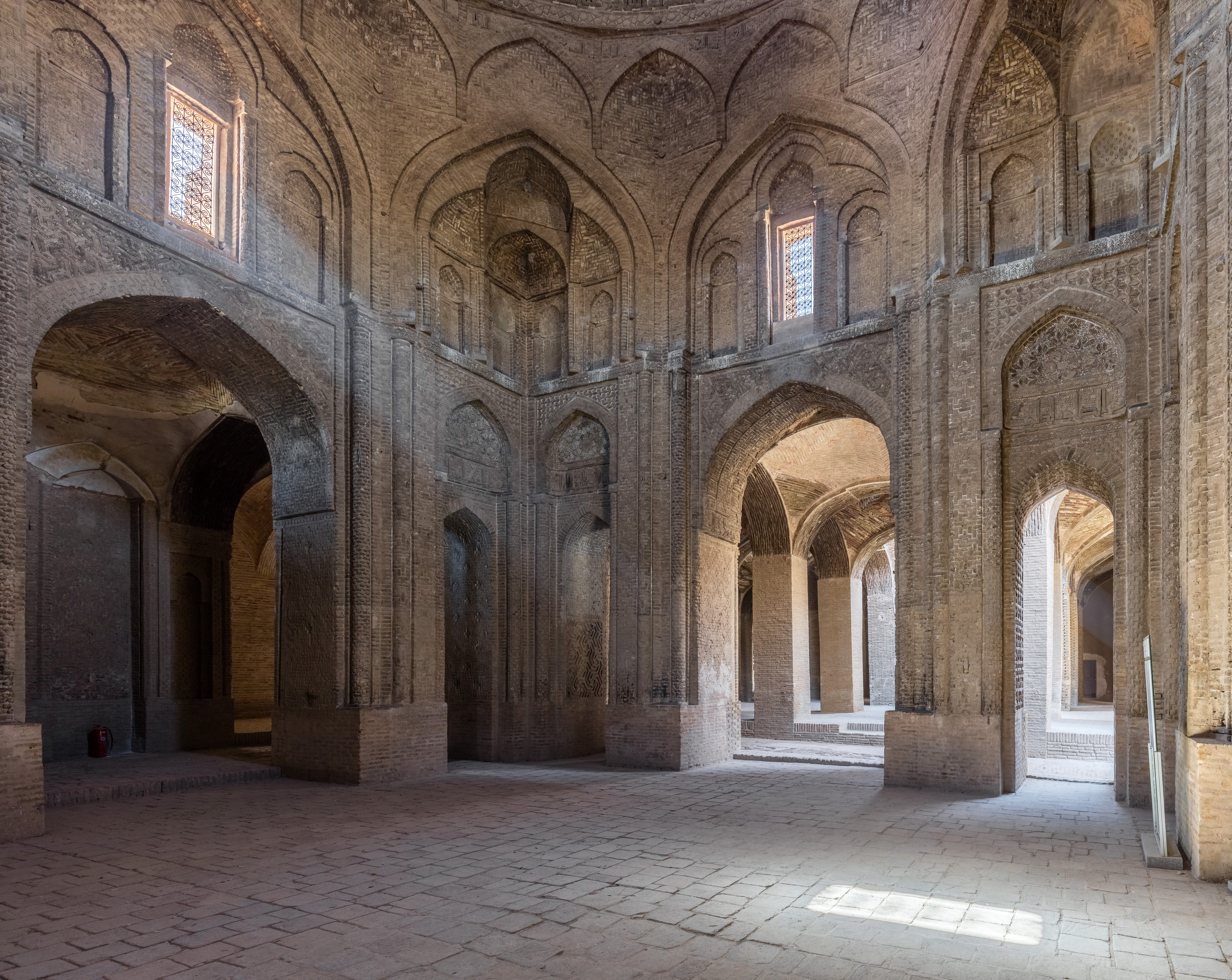

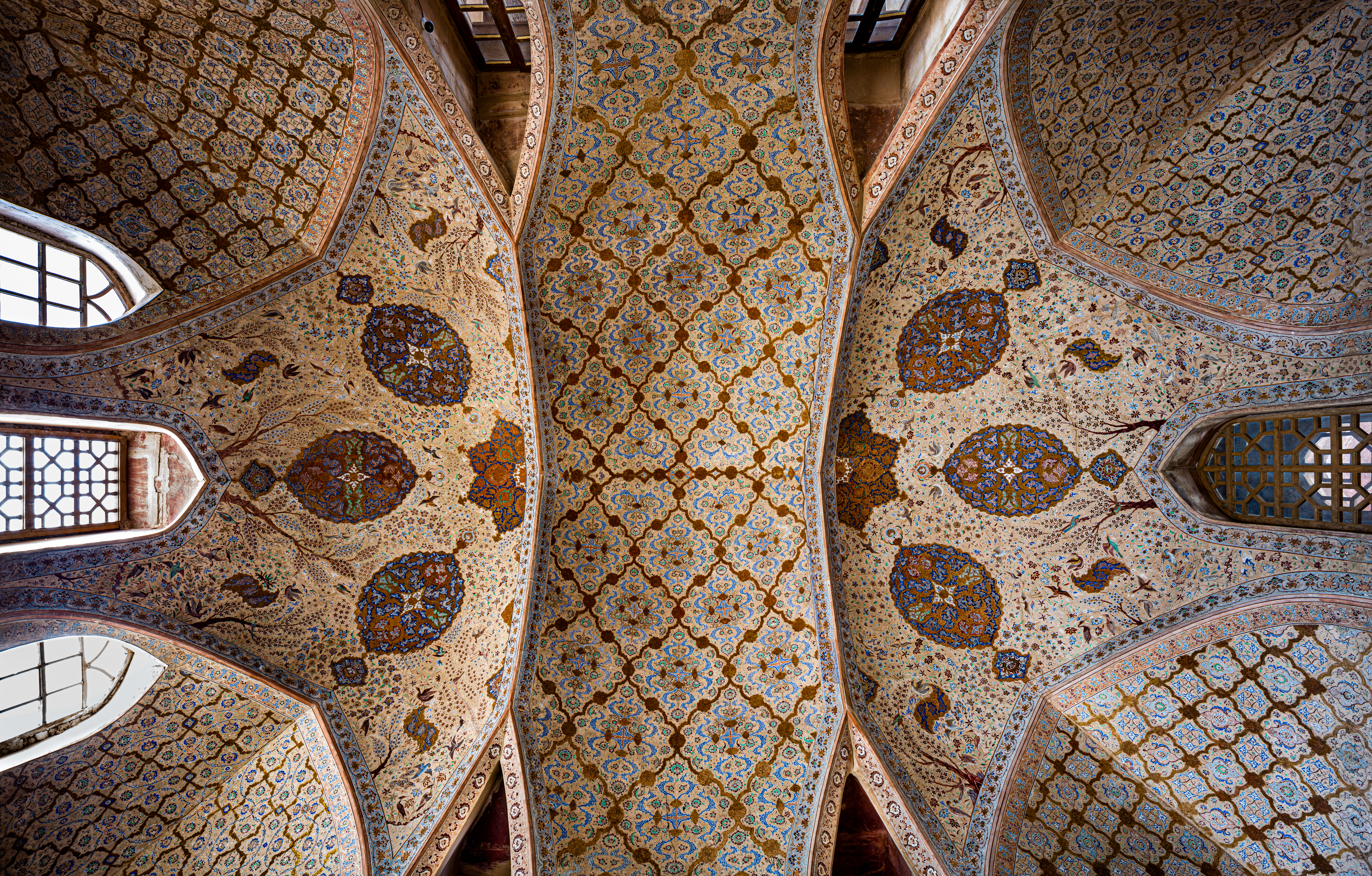
Ceiling in the Ali Qapu Palace, Isfahan

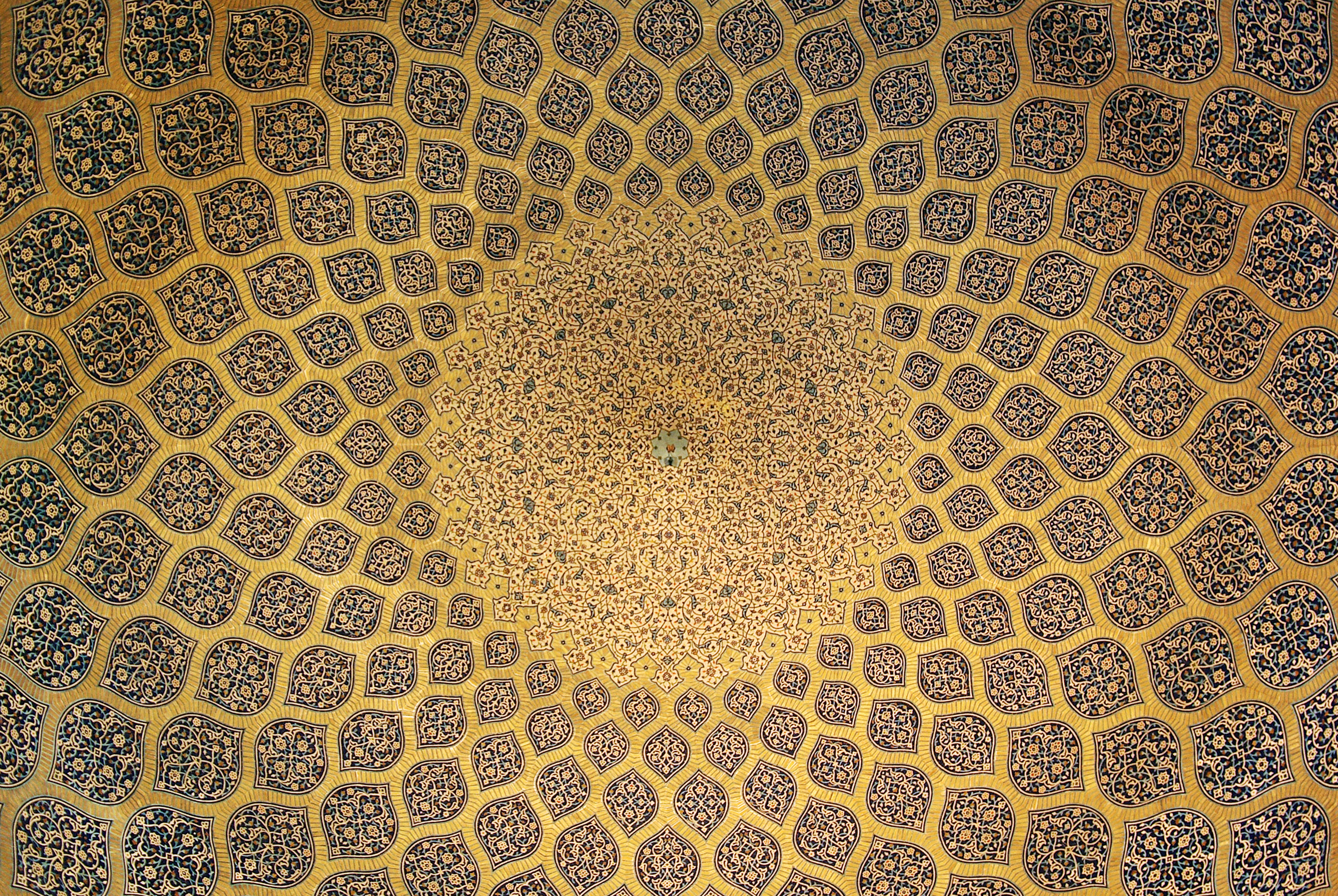
The dome of Sheikh Lotfollah Mosque, Isfahan

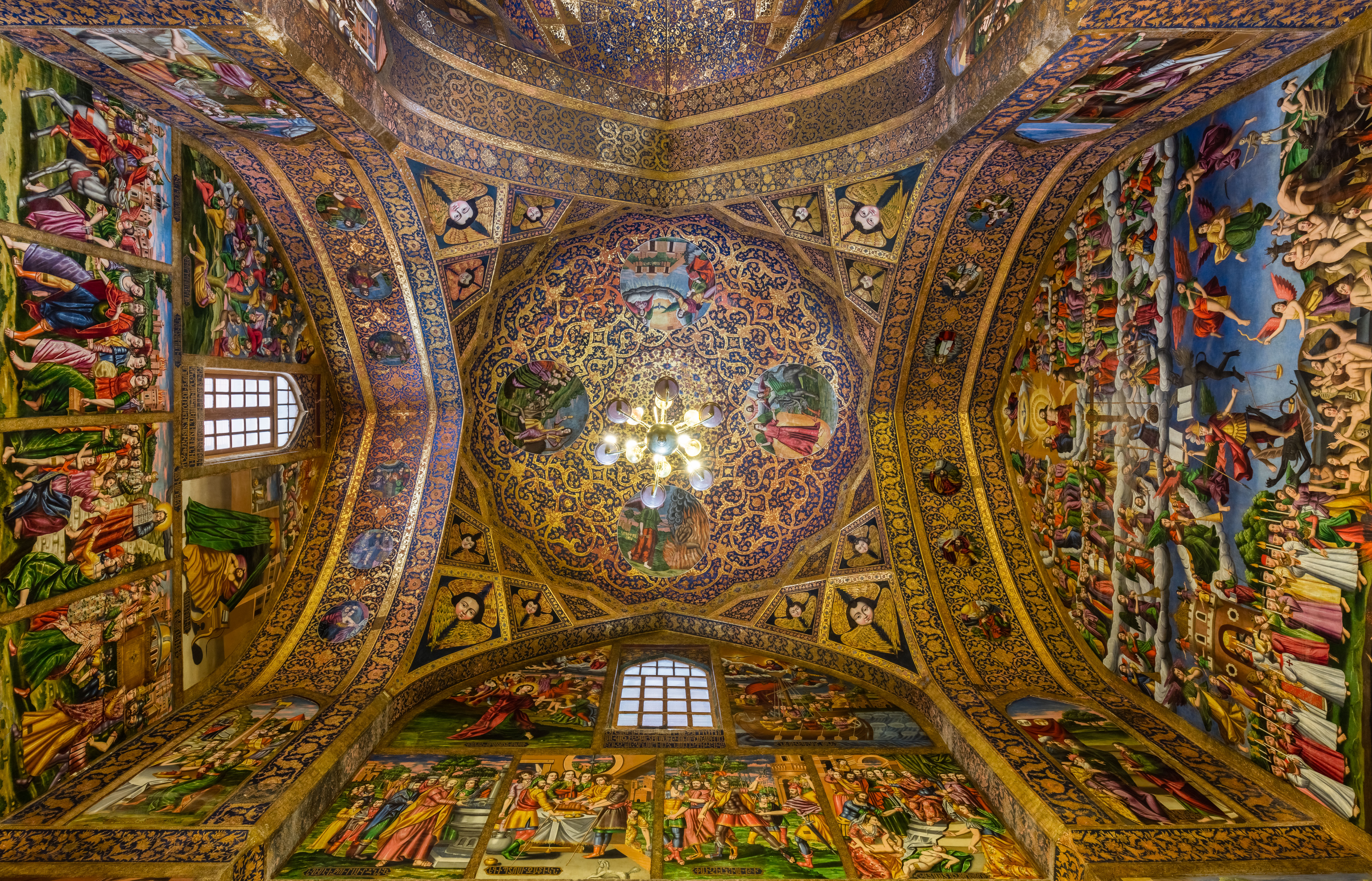
Vank Cathedral, Isfahan

== See also ==
- Georgians in Iran
- History of Iran
- List of the historical structures in the Isfahan province
- List of cities in Isfahan Province by population
- Ostandari Isfahan
- Media related to Isfahan Province at Wikimedia Commons

== Bibliography ==
- Albert Houtum-Schindler (1897). "Province of Isfahan". Eastern Persian Irak. London: J. Murray and Royal Geographical Society. pp. 119+. hdl:2027/mdp.39015000658461.
