= Golabad =

Golabad (Persian: گل اباد) may refer to:

- Golabad, Chaharmahal and Bakhtiari
- Golabad, Sarab, East Azerbaijan Province
- Golabad, Shabestar, East Azerbaijan Province
- Golabad, Hamadan
- Golabad, Nain, Isfahan Province
- Golabad, Natanz, Isfahan Province
- Golabad, Fahraj, Kerman Province
- Golabad, Sirjan, Kerman Province
- Golabad, Lorestan
- Golabad, Iranshahr, Sistan and Baluchestan Province
- Golabad, West Azerbaijan
