= Hend =

Hend may refer to

- Hend (name)
- Louis Forniquet Henderson (1853–1942), American botanist referred to as L.F.Hend.
- Hend Khaleh Rural District in Iran
- Hend Khaleh, a village in Iran
- Fariz Hend, a village in Iran
- Bid Hend, Isfahan, a village in Iran
