= Chimeh =

Chimeh چيمه
- Village
- Location within Iran
- Coordinates: 33°33′06″N 51°45′07″E
- Country: Iran
- Province: Isfahan
- County: Natanz
- Bakhsh: Central
- Rural District: Barzrud

Population (2006)
  - Total: 283
- Time zone: UTC+3:30 (IRST)
  - Summer (DST): UTC+4:30 (IRDT)

Chimeh (Persian: چيمه, also Romanized as Chīmeh; also known as Chīma and Maḩalleh-ye Deh-e Chīmeh) is a village in Barzrud Rural District, in the Central District of Natanz County, Isfahan Province, Iran. At the 2006 census, its population was 283, in 139 families.
