= Tameh =

Village in Isfahan province, Iran

Tameh Persian: طامه
- Village
- Location within Iran
- Coordinates: 33°27′58″N 51°52′47″E
- Country: Iran
- Province: Isfahan
- County: Natanz
- District: Central
- Rural District: Karkas

Population (2016)
  - Total: 454
- Time zone: UTC+3:30 (IRST)

Tameh (Persian: طامه) (Note: Also romanized as Ţāmeh; also known as Tehāmi) is a village in, and the capital of, Karkas Rural District in the Central District of Natanz County, Isfahan province, Iran.

== Demographics ==
=== Population ===
At the time of the 2006 National Census, the village's population was 650 in 204 households. The following census in 2011 counted 409 people in 140 households. The 2016 census measured the population of the village as 454 people in 183 households, the most populous in its rural district.
