= Yahyaabad, Natanz =

Neighborhood in Isfahan province, Iran

Yahyaabad Persian: يحيي اباد
- Neighborhood
- Location within Iran
- Coordinates: 33°20′22″N 51°46′20″E
- Country: Iran
- Province: Isfahan
- County: Natanz
- District: Central
- City: Tarqrud

Population (2011)
  - Total: 140
- Time zone: UTC+3:30 (IRST)

Yahyaabad (Persian: يحيي اباد) (Note: Also romanized as Yaḩyáābād) is a neighborhood in the city of Tarqrud in the Central District of Natanz County, Isfahan province, Iran.

== Demographics ==
=== Population ===
At the time of the 2006 National Census, Yahyaabad's population was 168 in 41 households, when it was a village in Tarq Rud Rural District. The following census in 2011 counted 140 people in 50 households.

In 2011, the village of Tarq, after merging with the villages of Abkesheh, Baghestan-e Bala, Baghestan-e Pain, Kesheh, and Yahyaabad, was converted to city and renamed Tarqrud.
