= Asiyab-e Kohneh =

Village in Isfahan province, Iran

Asiyab-e Kohneh Persian: آسیاب کهنه
- Village
- Country: Iran
- Province: Isfahan
- County: Natanz
- District: Central
- Rural District: Tarq Rud

Population (2011)
  - Total: 34
- Time zone: UTC+3:30 (IRST)

Asiyab-e Kohneh (Persian: آسیاب کهنه) (Note: Also romanized as Āsīyāb-e Kohneh; also known as Mollā Khaleyl (ملاخلیل)) is a village in Tarq Rud Rural District of the Central District in Natanz County, Isfahan province, Iran.

== Demographics ==
=== Population ===
At the time of the 2006 National Census, the village's population was 28 in nine households. The following census in 2011 counted 34 people in 11 households. The village did not appear in the census of 2016.
