= Komjan, Isfahan =

Village in Isfahan province, Iran

Komjan Persian: كمجان
- Village
- Location within Iran
- Coordinates: 33°35′00″N 51°39′45″E
- Country: Iran
- Province: Isfahan
- County: Natanz
- District: Central
- Rural District: Barzrud

Population (2016)
  - Total: 140
- Time zone: UTC+3:30 (IRST)

Komjan (Persian: كمجان) (Note: Also romanized as Komjān) is a village in Barzrud Rural District of the Central District in Natanz County, Isfahan province, Iran.

== Demographics ==
At the time of the 2006 National Census, the village's population was 158 in 80 households. The following census in 2011 counted 159 people in 68 households. The 2016 census measured the population of the village as 140 people in 55 households.
