= Jarian =

Village in Isfahan province, Iran

Jarian Persian: جاريان
- Village
- Location within Iran
- Coordinates: 33°31′38″N 51°57′03″E
- Country: Iran
- Province: Isfahan
- County: Natanz
- District: Central
- Rural District: Karkas

Population (2016)
  - Total: 98
- Time zone: UTC+3:30 (IRST)

Jarian (Persian: جاريان) (Note: Also romanized as Jāreyān and Jārīān) is a village in Karkas Rural District of the Central District in Natanz County, Isfahan province, Iran.

== Demographics ==
=== Population ===
At the time of the 2006 National Census, the village's population was 27 in 16 households. The following census in 2011 counted 51 people in 24 households. The 2016 census measured the population of the village as 98 people in 60 households.
