= Abkesheh =

Neighborhood in Isfahan province, Iran

Abkesheh Persian: اب كشه
- Neighborhood
- Location within Iran
- Coordinates: 33°21′N 51°51′E
- Country: Iran
- Province: Isfahan
- County: Natanz
- District: Central
- City: Tarqrud

Population (2011)
  - Total: 270
- Time zone: UTC+3:30 (IRST)

Abkesheh (Persian: اب كشه) (Note: Also romanized as Ābkesheh; also known as Ābgesheh and Maḩalleh-ye Ābkesh) is a neighborhood in the city of Tarqrud in the Central District of Natanz County, Isfahan province, Iran.

== Demographics ==
=== Population ===
At the time of the 2006 National Census, Abkesheh's population was 78 in 28 households, when it was a village in Tarq Rud Rural District. The following census in 2011 counted 270 people in 93 households.

In 2011, the village of Tarq, after merging with the villages of Abkesheh, Baghestan-e Bala, Baghestan-e Pain, Kesheh, and Yahyaabad was converted to a city and renamed Tarqrud.
