= Golabad, Natanz =

Golabad گل اباد
- Village
- Location within Iran
- Coordinates: 33°19′38″N 52°04′22″E
- Country: Iran
- Province: Isfahan
- County: Natanz
- Bakhsh: Central
- Rural District: Karkas

Population (2006)
  - Total: 19
- Time zone: UTC+3:30 (IRST)
  - Summer (DST): UTC+4:30 (IRDT)

Golabad (Persian: گل اباد, also Romanized as Golābād) is a village in Karkas Rural District, in the Central District of Natanz County, Isfahan Province, Iran. At the 2006 census, its population was 19, in 5 families.
