= Khafr, Natanz =

Village in Isfahan province, Iran

Khafr Persian: خفر
- Village
- Location within Iran
- Coordinates: 33°32′08″N 51°57′57″E
- Country: Iran
- Province: Isfahan
- County: Natanz
- District: Central
- Rural District: Karkas

Population (2016)
  - Total: 170
- Time zone: UTC+3:30 (IRST)

Khafr (Persian: خفر) is a village in Karkas Rural District of the Central District in Natanz County, Isfahan province, Iran.

== Demographics ==
=== Population ===
At the time of the 2006 National Census, the village's population was 185 in 92 households. The following census in 2011 counted 62 people in 37 households. The 2016 census measured the population of the village as 170 people in 75 households.
