= Nosran =

Village in Isfahan province, Iran

Nosran Persian: نسران
- Village
- Location within Iran
- Coordinates: 33°27′49″N 52°01′46″E
- Country: Iran
- Province: Isfahan
- County: Natanz
- District: Central
- Rural District: Karkas

Population (2016)
  - Total: 200
- Time zone: UTC+3:30 (IRST)

Nosran (Persian: نسران) (Note: Also romanized as Nasaran, Nasrān, and Nosrān; also known as Naşrand and Nosrand) is a village in Karkas Rural District of the Central District in Natanz County, Isfahan province, Iran.

== Demographics ==
=== Population ===
At the time of the 2006 National Census, the village's population was 257 in 67 households. The following census in 2011 counted 262 people in 72 households. The 2016 census measured the population of the village as 200 people in 88 households.

== Overview ==
This village is located about 15 km far from Natanz town. Most of the villagers are retired from Islamic Republic of Iran Railways or engaged in farming. This village is near the Espidan village, Mohamadabad farm, Aliabad farm and also Khodabandeabad farm.

== Agriculture ==
Pomegranates and figs are two important crops in the village of Nosran.
