= Salehabad, Natanz =

Village in Isfahan province, Iran

Salehabad Persian: صالح اباد
- Village
- Location within Iran
- Coordinates: 33°34′43″N 51°47′56″E
- Country: Iran
- Province: Isfahan
- County: Natanz
- District: Central
- Rural District: Barzrud

Population (2016)
  - Total: 117
- Time zone: UTC+3:30 (IRST)

Salehabad (Persian: صالح اباد) (Note: Also romanized as Şāleḩābād) is a village in Barzrud Rural District of the Central District in Natanz County, Isfahan province, Iran.

== Demographics ==
At the time of the 2006 National Census, the village's population was 131 in 42 households. The following census in 2011 counted 184 people in 74 households. The 2016 census measured the population of the village as 117 people in 48 households.
