= Baghestan-e Bala =

Neighborhood in Isfahan province, Iran

Baghestan-e Bala Persian: باغستان بالا
- Neighborhood
- Location within Iran
- Coordinates: 33°21′47″N 51°47′19″E
- Country: Iran
- Province: Isfahan
- County: Natanz
- District: Central
- City: Tarqrud

Population (2011)
  - Total: 255
- Time zone: UTC+3:30 (IRST)

Baghestan-e Bala (Persian: باغستان بالا) (Note: Also romanized as Bāghestān-e Bālā; also known as Bāghestān) is a neighborhood in the city of Tarqrud in the Central District of Natanz County, Isfahan province, Iran.

== Demographics ==
=== Population ===
At the time of the 2006 National Census, Baghestan-e Bala's population was 210 in 90 households, when it was a village in Tarq Rud Rural District. The following census in 2011 counted 255 people in 113 households.

In 2011, the village of Tarq, after merging with the villages of Abkesheh, Baghestan-e Bala, Baghestan-e Pain, Kesheh, and Yahyaabad, was converted to a city and renamed Tarqrud.
