= Milajerd, Isfahan =

Village in Isfahan province, Iran

Milajerd Persian: ميلاجرد
- Village
- Location within Iran
- Coordinates: 33°25′41″N 52°00′05″E
- Country: Iran
- Province: Isfahan
- County: Natanz
- District: Central
- Rural District: Karkas

Population (2016)
  - Total: 183
- Time zone: UTC+3:30 (IRST)

Milajerd (Persian: ميلاجرد) (Note: Also romanized as Mīlājerd and Mīlājord) is a village in Karkas Rural District of the Central District in Natanz County, Isfahan province, Iran.

== Demographics ==
=== Population ===
At the time of the 2006 National Census, the village's population was 285 in 84 households. The following census in 2011 counted 269 people in 88 households. The 2016 census measured the population of the village as 183 people in 67 households.
