= Mezdeh, Isfahan =

Village in Isfahan province, Iran

Mezdeh Persian: مزده
- Village
- Location within Iran
- Coordinates: 33°23′24″N 51°50′39″E
- Country: Iran
- Province: Isfahan
- County: Natanz
- District: Central
- Rural District: Tarq Rud

Population (2016)
  - Total: 161
- Time zone: UTC+3:30 (IRST)

Mezdeh (Persian: مزده) (Note: Also romanized as Mazdeh; also known as Maija and Mazdābād) is a village in Tarq Rud Rural District of the Central District in Natanz County, Isfahan province, Iran.

== Demographics ==
=== Population ===
At the time of the 2006 National Census, the village's population was 203 in 71 households. The following census in 2011 counted 337 people in 129 households. The 2016 census measured the population of the village as 161 people in 82 households.
