= Vishteh =

Village in Isfahan province, Iran

Vishteh Persian: ويشته
- Village
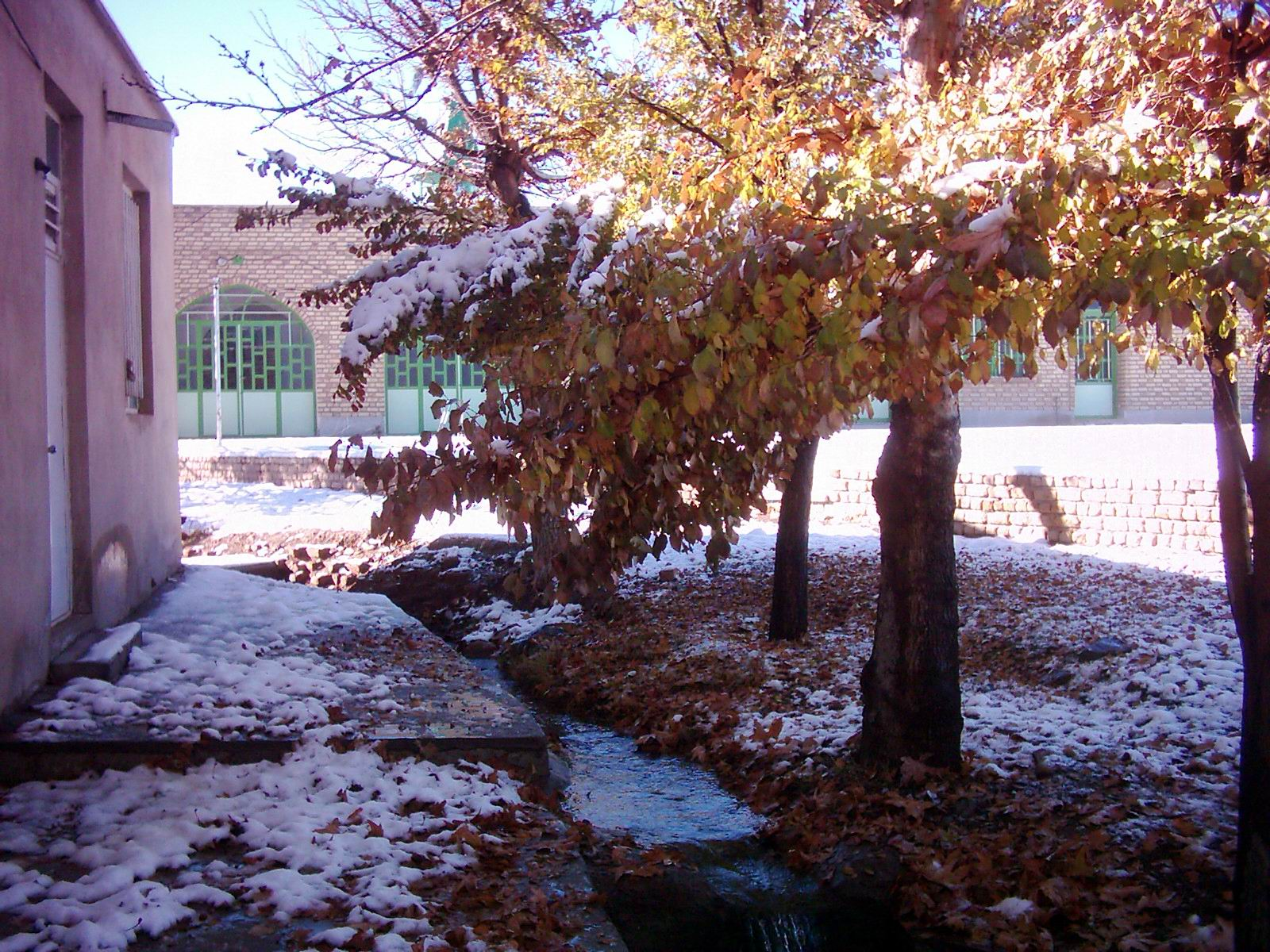
- The village of Vishteh

- Location within Iran
- Coordinates: 33°30′53″N 51°57′02″E
- Country: Iran
- Province: Isfahan
- County: Natanz
- District: Central
- Rural District: Karkas

Population (2016)
  - Total: 109
- Time zone: UTC+3:30 (IRST)

Vishteh (Persian: ويشته) (Note: Also romanized as Vīshteh) is a village in Karkas Rural District of the Central District in Natanz County, Isfahan province, Iran.

== Demographics ==
=== Population ===
At the time of the 2006 National Census, the village's population was 41 in 11 households. The following census in 2011 counted 32 people in 12 households. The 2016 census measured the population of the village as 109 people in 46 households.
