= Tekyeh, Isfahan =

Village in Isfahan province, Iran

Tekyeh Persian: تكيه
- Village
- Location within Iran
- Coordinates: 33°32′10″N 51°43′48″E
- Country: Iran
- Province: Isfahan
- County: Natanz
- District: Central
- Rural District: Barzrud

Population (2016)
  - Total: 145
- Time zone: UTC+3:30 (IRST)

Tekyeh (Persian: تكيه) (Note: Also known as Tekyehsadat) is a village in Barzrud Rural District of the Central District in Natanz County, Isfahan province, Iran.

== Demographics ==
At the time of the 2006 National Census, the village's population was 66 in 36 households. The following census in 2011 counted 49 people in 24 households. The 2016 census measured the population of the village as 145 people in 63 households.
