= Tareh =

Village in Isfahan province, Iran

Tareh Persian: طره
- Village
- Location within Iran
- Coordinates: 33°35′00″N 51°37′13″E
- Country: Iran
- Province: Isfahan
- County: Natanz
- District: Central
- Rural District: Barzrud

Population (2016)
  - Total: 87
- Time zone: UTC+3:30 (IRST)

Tareh (Persian: طره) (Note: Also romanized as Ţareh; also known as Turreh) is a village in Barzrud Rural District of the Central District in Natanz County, Isfahan province, Iran.

== Demographics ==
At the time of the 2006 National Census, the village's population was 244 in 124 households. The following census in 2011 counted 208 people in 129 households. The 2016 census measured the population of the village as 87 people in 55 households.
