= Papakht =

Village in Isfahan province, Iran

Papakht Persian: پاپخت
- Village
- Location within Iran
- Coordinates: 33°21′12″N 51°52′17″E
- Country: Iran
- Province: Isfahan
- County: Natanz
- District: Central
- Rural District: Tarq Rud

Population (2016)
  - Total: 25
- Time zone: UTC+3:30 (IRST)

Papakht (Persian: پاپخت) (Note: Also romanized as Pāpakht; also known as Mazra‘eh-ye Pāboţ, Pā Bokht, Pā Takht, Pābot, and Pābukht) is a village in Tarq Rud Rural District of the Central District in Natanz County, Isfahan province, Iran.

== Demographics ==
=== Population ===
At the time of the 2006 National Census, the village's population was 15 in four households. The following census in 2011 counted 22 people in five households. The 2016 census measured the population of the village as 25 people in 14 households.
