= Tarq Castle =

Coordinates: 33°20′58″N 51°48′14″E

- قلعه طرق
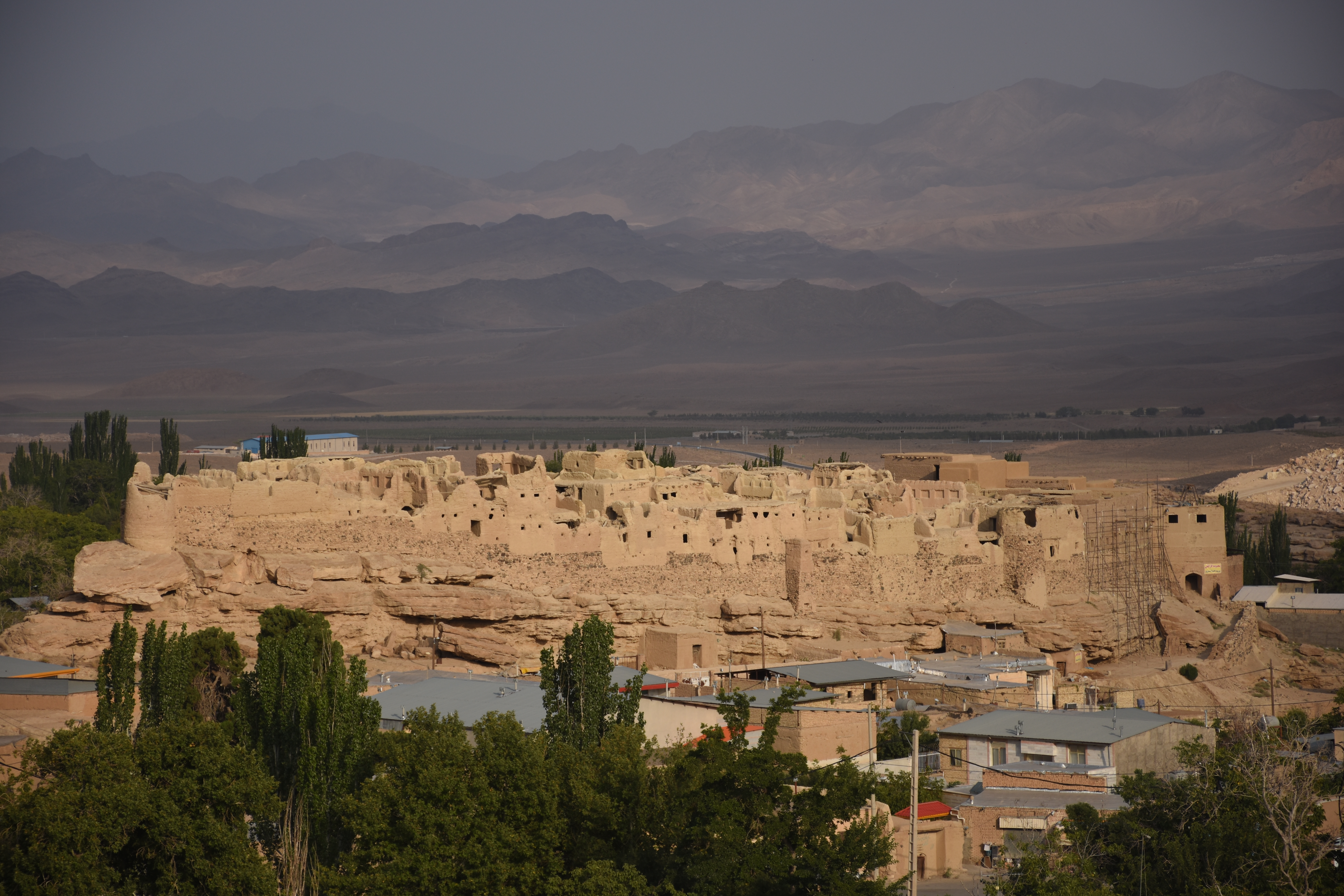
- Interactive map of the Tarq Castle area

General information
- Type: Castle
- Location: Tarqrud, Iran

Tarq Castle (Persian: قلعه طرق) or Tarqrud Castle (Persian: قلعه طرق‌رود) is an ancient castle and historic site located in the city of Tarqrud in the Central District of Natanz County, Isfahan province, Iran. It dates back to the rule of the Iranian Parthian Empire (247 BC – 224 AD).
