= Baghestan-e Pain =

Neighborhood in Isfahan province, Iran

Baghestan-e Pain Persian: باغستان پايين
- Neighborhood
- Location within Iran
- Coordinates: 33°20′25″N 51°48′20″E
- Country: Iran
- Province: Isfahan
- County: Natanz
- District: Central
- City: Tarqrud

Population (2011)
  - Total: 407
- Time zone: UTC+3:30 (IRST)

Baghestan-e Pain (Persian: باغستان پايين) (Note: Also romanized as Bāghestān-e Pā’īn) is a neighborhood in the city of Tarqrud in the Central District of Natanz County, Isfahan province, Iran.

== Demographics ==
=== Population ===
At the time of the 2006 National Census, Baghestan-e Pain's population was 381 in 134 households, when it was a village in Tarq Rud Rural District. The following census in 2011 counted 407 people in 164 households.

In 2011, the village of Tarq, after merging with the villages of Abkesheh, Baghestan-e Bala, Baghestan-e Pain, Kesheh, and Yahyaabad, was converted to a city and renamed Tarqrud.
