= Ureh =

Village in Isfahan province, Iran

Ureh Persian: اوره
- Village
- Location within Iran
- Coordinates: 33°31′19″N 51°51′50″E
- Country: Iran
- Province: Isfahan
- County: Natanz
- District: Central
- Rural District: Karkas

Population (2016)
  - Total: 374
- Time zone: UTC+3:30 (IRST)

Ureh (Persian: اوره) (Note: Also romanized as Ooreh and Ūreh; also known as Ūreh-ye Pā’īn) is a village in Karkas Rural District of the Central District in Natanz County, Isfahan province, Iran.

== Demographics ==
=== Population ===
At the time of the 2006 National Census, the village's population was 251 in 103 households. The following census in 2011 counted 364 people in 140 households. The 2016 census measured the population of the village as 374 people in 123 households.
