= Barz, Iran =

Village in Isfahan province, Iran

Barz Persian: برز
- Village
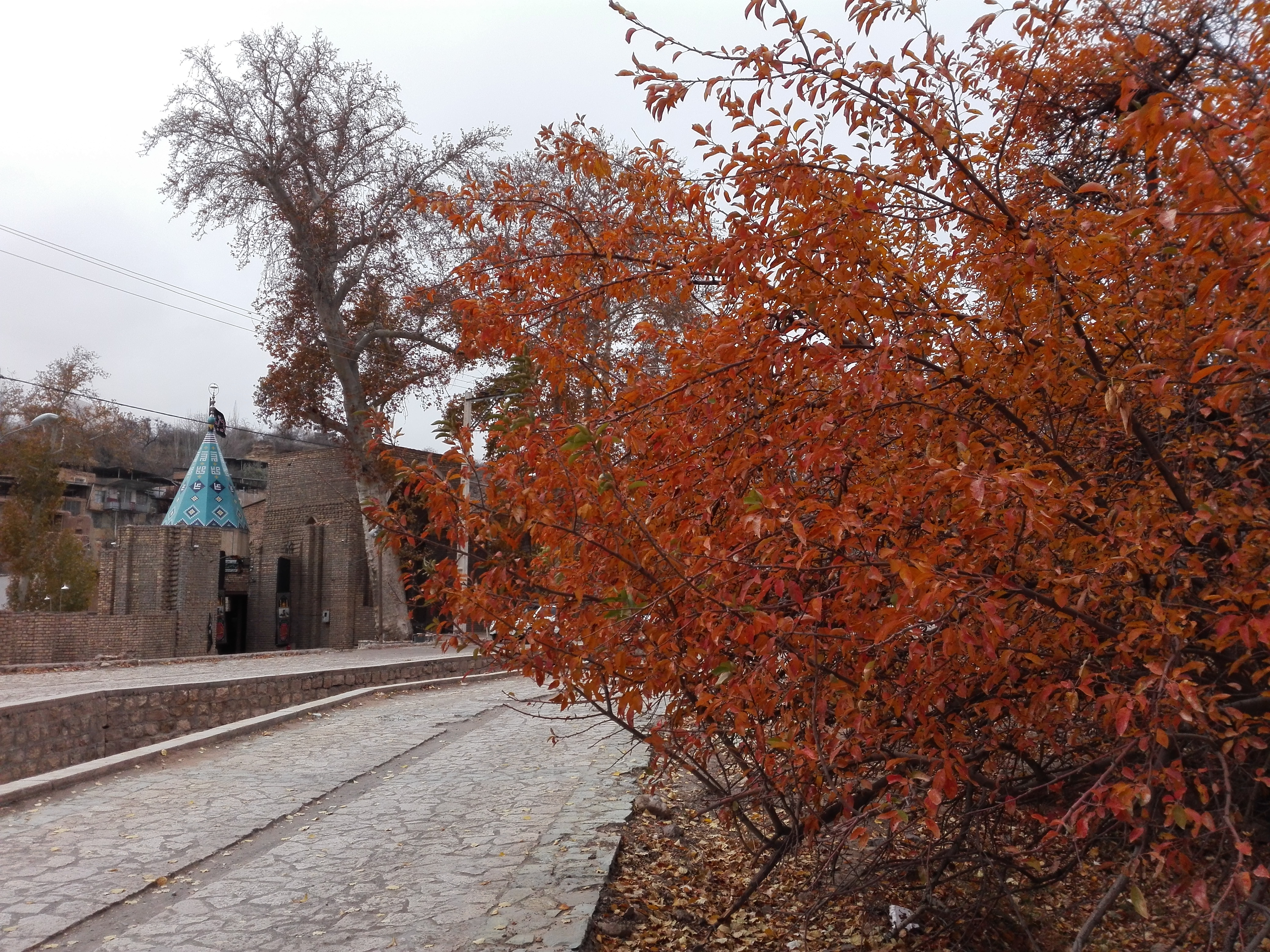
- Monument in the village of Barz

- Location within Iran
- Coordinates: 33°35′05″N 51°38′39″E
- Country: Iran
- Province: Isfahan
- County: Natanz
- District: Central
- Rural District: Barzrud

Population (2016)
  - Total: 156
- Time zone: UTC+3:30 (IRST)

Barz (Persian: برز) (Note: Also romanized as Borz) is a village in Barzrud Rural District of the Central District in Natanz County, Isfahan province, Iran.

== Demographics ==
At the time of the 2006 National Census, the village's population was 286 in 141 households. The following census in 2011 counted 300 people in 131 households. The 2016 census measured the population of the village as 156 people in 79 households.
