= Niyeh =

Village in Isfahan province, Iran

Niyeh Persian: نيه
- Village
- Location within Iran
- Coordinates: 33°20′45″N 51°52′12″E
- Country: Iran
- Province: Isfahan
- County: Natanz
- District: Central
- Rural District: Tarq Rud

Population (2016)
  - Total: 299
- Time zone: UTC+3:30 (IRST)

Niyeh (Persian: نيه) (Note: Also romanized as Neyeh and Nīyeh; also known as Nīr) is a village in Tarq Rud Rural District of the Central District in Natanz County, Isfahan province, Iran.

== Demographics ==
=== Population ===
At the time of the 2006 National Census, the village's population was 373 in 123 households. The following census in 2011 counted 358 people in 136 households. The 2016 census measured the population of the village as 299 people in 113 households, the most populous in its rural district.
