= Varguran =

Village in Isfahan province, Iran

Varguran Persian: ورگوران
- Village
- Location within Iran
- Coordinates: 33°23′11″N 51°47′03″E
- Country: Iran
- Province: Isfahan
- County: Natanz
- District: Central
- Rural District: Tarq Rud

Population (2016)
  - Total: 198
- Time zone: UTC+3:30 (IRST)

Varguran (Persian: ورگوران) (Note: Also romanized as Vargūrān) is a village in Tarq Rud Rural District of the Central District in Natanz County, Isfahan province, Iran.

== Demographics ==
=== Population ===
At the time of the 2006 National Census, the village's population was 201 in 58 households. The following census in 2011 counted 230 people in 88 households. The 2016 census measured the population of the village as 198 people in 67 households.
