= Hanjan, Isfahan =

Village in Isfahan province, Iran

Hanjan Persian: هنجن
- Village
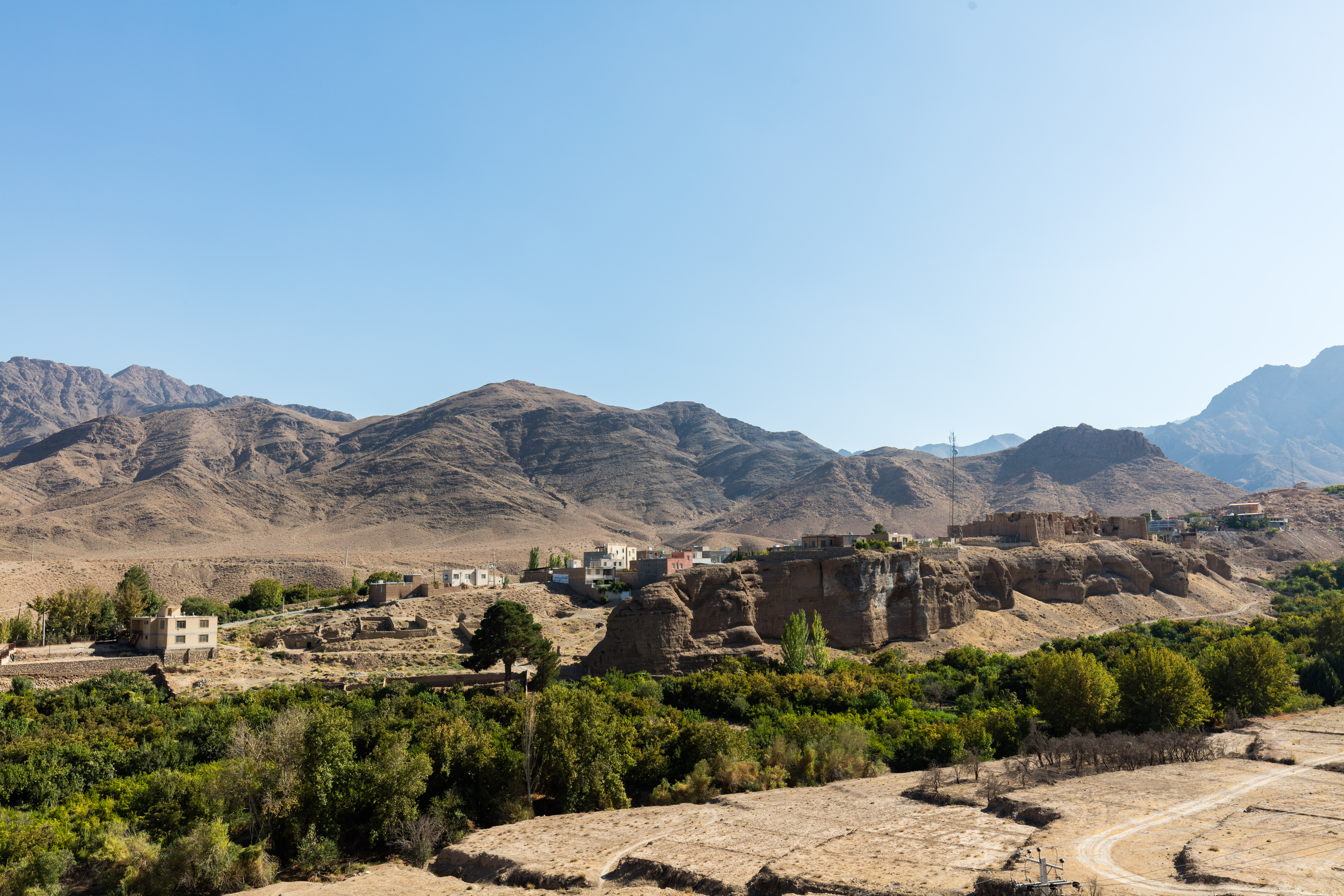
- Hanjan Castle

- Location within Iran
- Coordinates: 33°36′40″N 51°44′49″E
- Country: Iran
- Province: Isfahan
- County: Natanz
- District: Central
- Rural District: Barzrud

Population (2016)
  - Total: 154
- Time zone: UTC+3:30 (IRST)

Hanjan (Persian: هنجن) is a village in, and the capital of, Barzrud Rural District in the Central District of Natanz County, Isfahan province, Iran.

== Demographics ==
=== Population ===
At the time of the 2006 National Census, the village's population was 234 in 110 households. The following census in 2011 counted 197 people in 83 households. The 2016 census measured the population of the village as 154 people in 64 households.
