= Fariz Hend =

Fariz Hend فريزهند
- Village
- Location within Iran
- Coordinates: 33°31′15″N 51°42′21″E
- Country: Iran
- Province: Isfahan
- County: Natanz
- Bakhsh: Central
- Rural District: Barzrud

Population (2006)
  - Total: 163
- Time zone: UTC+3:30 (IRST)
  - Summer (DST): UTC+4:30 (IRDT)

Fariz Hend (Persian: فريزهند, also Romanized as Farīz Hend, Farīz Hand, and Ferīz Hand) is a village in Barzrud Rural District, in the Central District of Natanz County, Isfahan Province, Iran. At the 2006 census, its population was 163, in 87 families.
