= Tar, Isfahan =

Village in Isfahan province, Iran

Tar Persian: طار
- Village
- Location within Iran
- Coordinates: 33°22′26″N 51°45′03″E
- Country: Iran
- Province: Isfahan
- County: Natanz
- District: Central
- Rural District: Tarq Rud
- Established: 1290

Area
  - Total: 360 km^{2} (140 sq mi)
- Elevation: 2,576 m (8,451 ft)

Population (2016)
  - Total: 143
  - Density: 0.40/km^{2} (1.0/sq mi)
- Time zone: UTC+3:30 (IRST)
- Area code: 031

Tar (Persian: طار) (Note: Also Romanized as Ţār) is a village in Tarq Rud Rural District of the Central District in Natanz County, Isfahan province, Iran.

== Etymology ==
Tar, in the word translates to (Parthian Pahlavi) "hidden heaven."

== History ==
The old building, which is called Baba Abdullah Mausoleum, was the first fire temple in which the Zoroastrian practise of fire worship could be practiced by the priests who were tasked with keeping the temple fire to burn without interpretation, similarly to the Olympic torch which is tended to in order for its flame to remain ever-burning.

After the eventual discovery of Tar Village, this fire temple was renamed Baba-Abdullah in fear for it being destroyed under the guise was existing as a non-Islamic institution of worship. The original name of this fire temple is unknown. Upon the arrival of the Arab conquest there was also a change of its role, possibly into a mosque, before it was abandoned. Nader Shah the Great was also known to pass through this place during intentions in fighting the Afghans tribes within the region. Tar has been the summer resort of Safavid kings, including Shah Abbas Safavid.

== Demographics ==
=== Population ===
At the time of the 2006 National Census, the village's population was 259 in 110 households. The following census in 2011 counted 375 people in 157 households. The 2016 census measured the population of the village as 143 people in 59 households.
