= Bid Hend, Isfahan =

Village in Isfahan province, Iran

Bid Hend Persian: بيدهند
- Village
- Location within Iran
- Coordinates: 33°30′03″N 51°45′28″E
- Country: Iran
- Province: Isfahan
- County: Natanz
- District: Central
- Rural District: Barzrud

Population (2016)
  - Total: 110
- Time zone: UTC+3:30 (IRST)

Bid Hend (Persian: بيدهند) (Note: Also romanized as Bīd Hand and Bīd Hend) is a village in Barzrud Rural District of the Central District in Natanz County, Isfahan province, Iran.

== Demographics ==
At the time of the 2006 National Census, the village's population was 292 in 176 households. The following census in 2011 counted 227 people in 147 households. The 2016 census measured the population of the village as 110 people in 50 households.
