= Abyaneh =

Village in Isfahan province, Iran

Abyaneh Persian: ابيانه
- Village
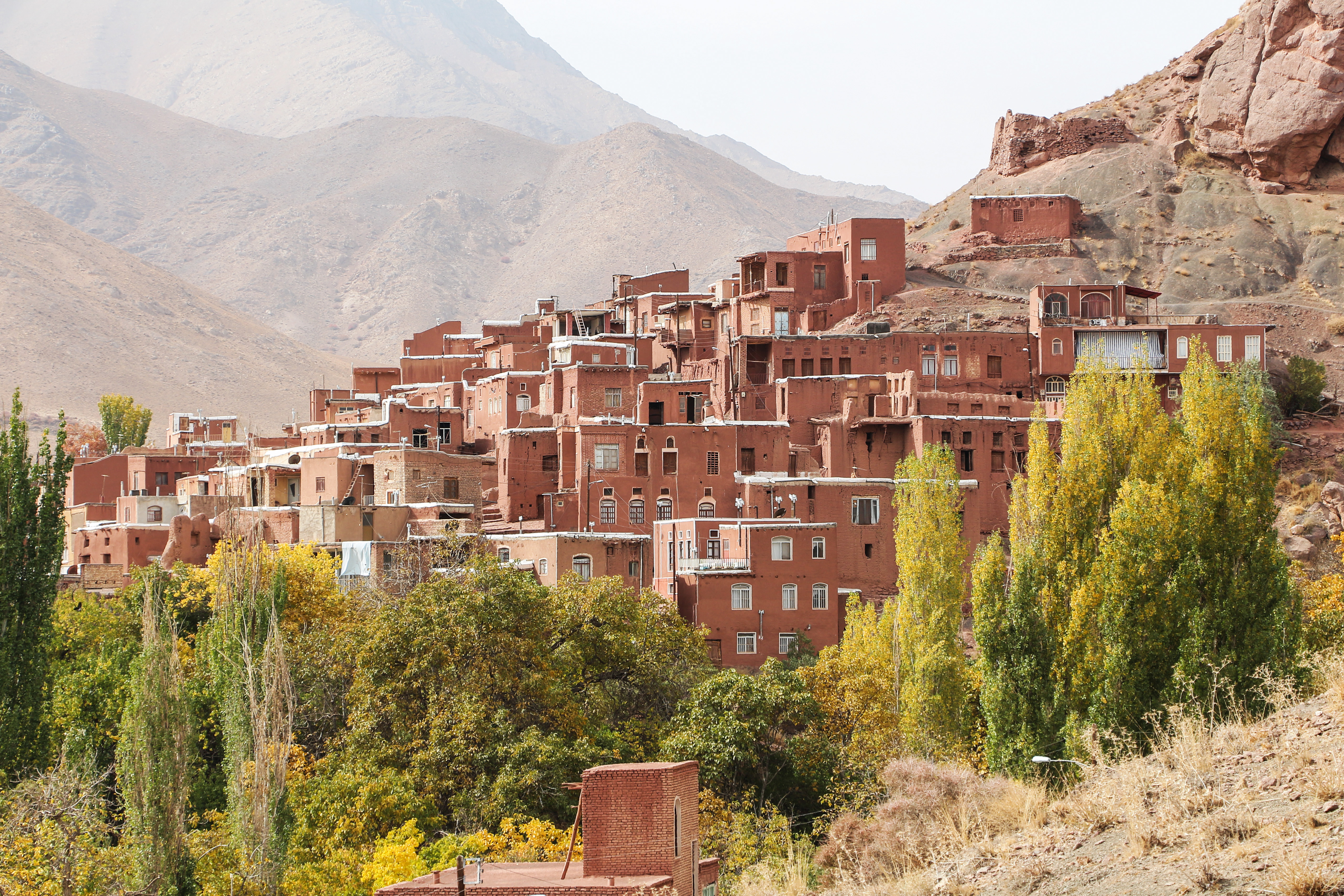
- Traditional architecture of the village

- Location within Iran
- Coordinates: 33°35′12″N 51°35′24″E
- Country: Iran
- Province: Isfahan
- County: Natanz
- District: Central
- Rural District: Barzrud

Population (2016)
  - Total: 301
- Time zone: UTC+3:30 (IRST)

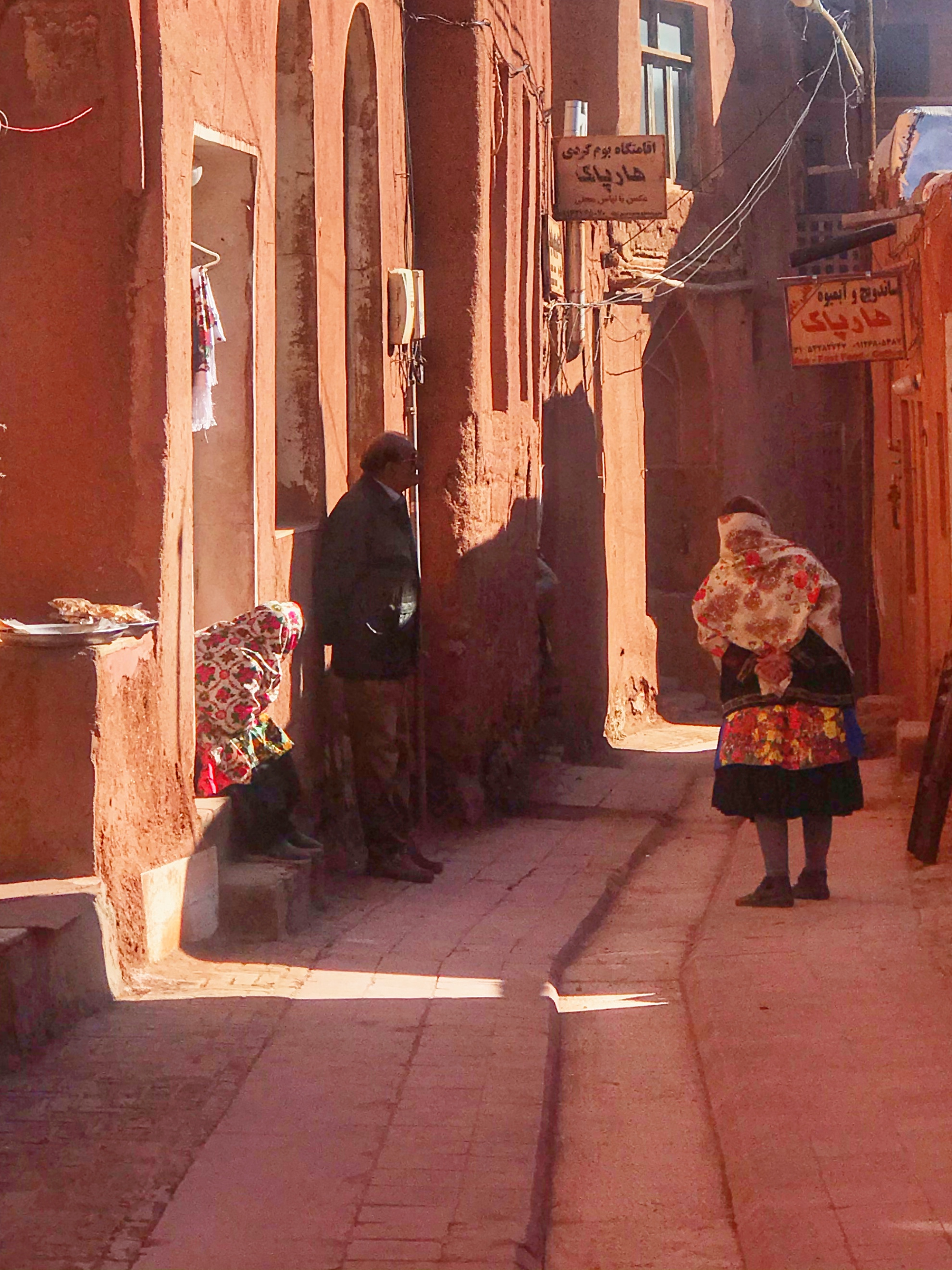
Woman in traditional dress

Abyaneh (Persian: ابيانه) (Note: Also romanized as Ābiāneh, Ābyāneh, and Abyāneh) is a village in Barzrud Rural District of the Central District in Natanz County, Isfahan province, Iran. The village is located 70 kilometres southeast of Kashan at 2100 meters above sea level in a valley of the Karkas Mountains. It is watered by the Barz River.

Its buildings have a reddish colour that comes from the red clay around the village containing iron oxides. Abyaneh has ancient structures including the Harpak Zoroastrian Fire Temple, Seljuq and Ilkhanid mosques as well as a mausoleum.

== Demographics ==
At the time of the 2006 National Census, the village's population was 305 in 160 households. The following census in 2011 counted 294 people in 173 households. The 2016 census measured the population of the village as 301 people in 147 households, the most populous in its rural district.

== Traditional costumes ==
The inhabitants of Abyaneh have maintained their costumes, wearing traditional outfits. Men wear a black coat and wide bottomed trousers. Women wear a knee skirt, cotton stockings and colorful, floral patterned headscarves that fall below the waist and traditional footwear called Giveh.

== Architecture ==
The building of Abyaneh are made of traditional red mudbrick featuring wooden balconies and lattice windows. Most of the house doors are decorated with ornamentation and engraved poems. They have two knockers: One for men and one for women. Male visitors use a heavy, rigid door knocker that makes a strong sound. The feminine door knocker is lighter and ring-like and creates a softer sound.

== Historic monuments ==
The Friday Mosque of Abyaneh dates back to the 11th century, though additions were made in later centuries. Dated from the Seljuk period, when brick was the preferred construction material, this is a rare example of the use of wood in the construction of a mosque. The mosque has a hypostyle type layout with a flat roof and wooden columns covering two shabestans, one for the summer, the other one for the winter. Its carved wooden entrance door, built in 1932, is adorned with floral patterns. The also wooden mihrab goes back to the 14th century, according to a date inscribed on it. A wooden minbar, built in 1073-1074 CE, is decorated with inscriptions and floral motifs. The wood surfaces of the ceiling are painted with floral and geometric motifs.

The small entrance door of the Ilkhanate-era Porzaleh Mosque is decorated with rosette carvings including its construction date of 1302 CE.

The imamzadeh shrine is said to house the remains of Isa and Yahya, sons of the seventh Shia Imam Musa ibn Ja'far (745-799 CE). The mausoleum has balconies and a large veranda overlooking the landscape around Abyaneh. In the middle of its center yard there is a large pool flanked by two domes, an interior spherical one and an outer octagonal one covered with turquoise tiles.

== Fortresses ==
The 200 year old Palahamooneh fortress is located on the opposite side of the village. Two other forts, Pala and Herdah are in the north and in the northeast of the village.

== Photo gallery ==
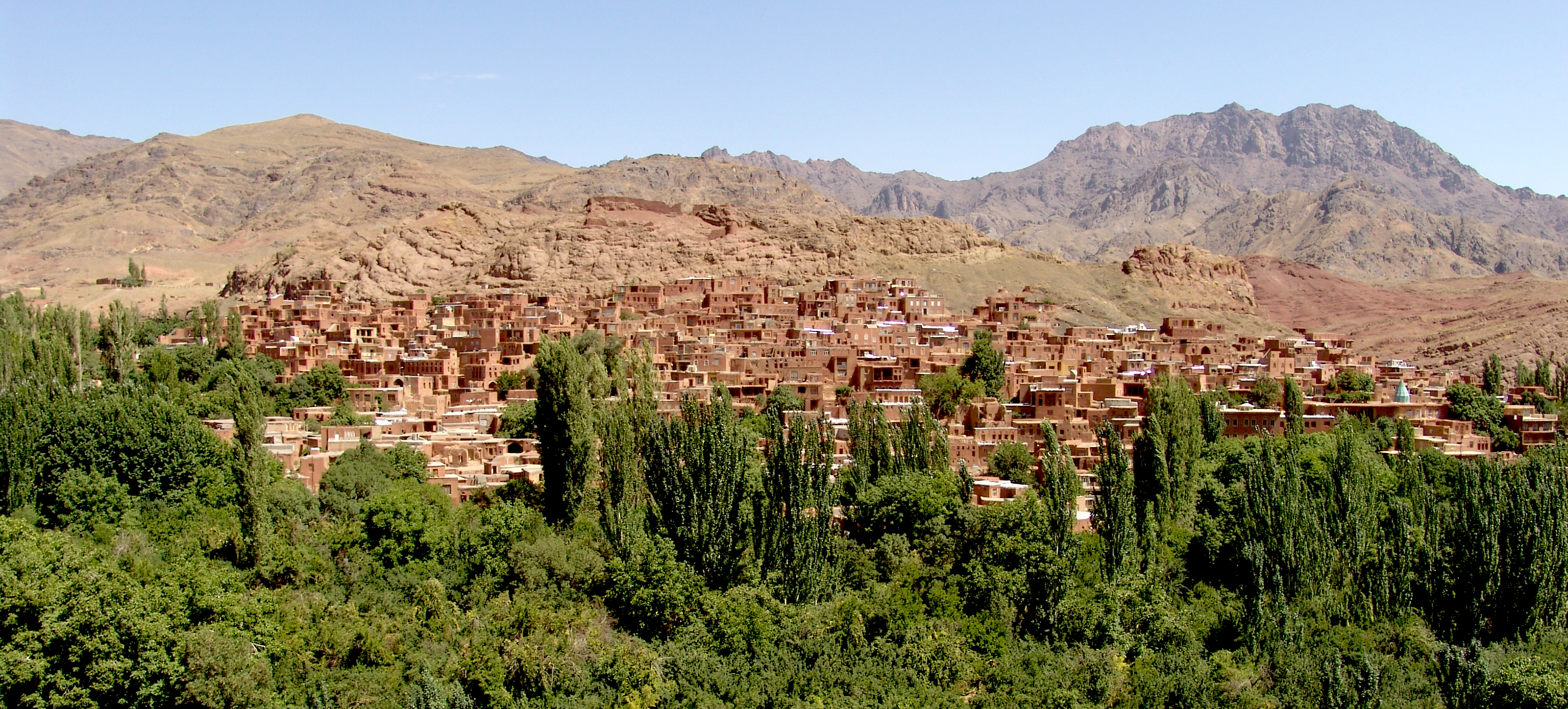
The red village Abyāneh

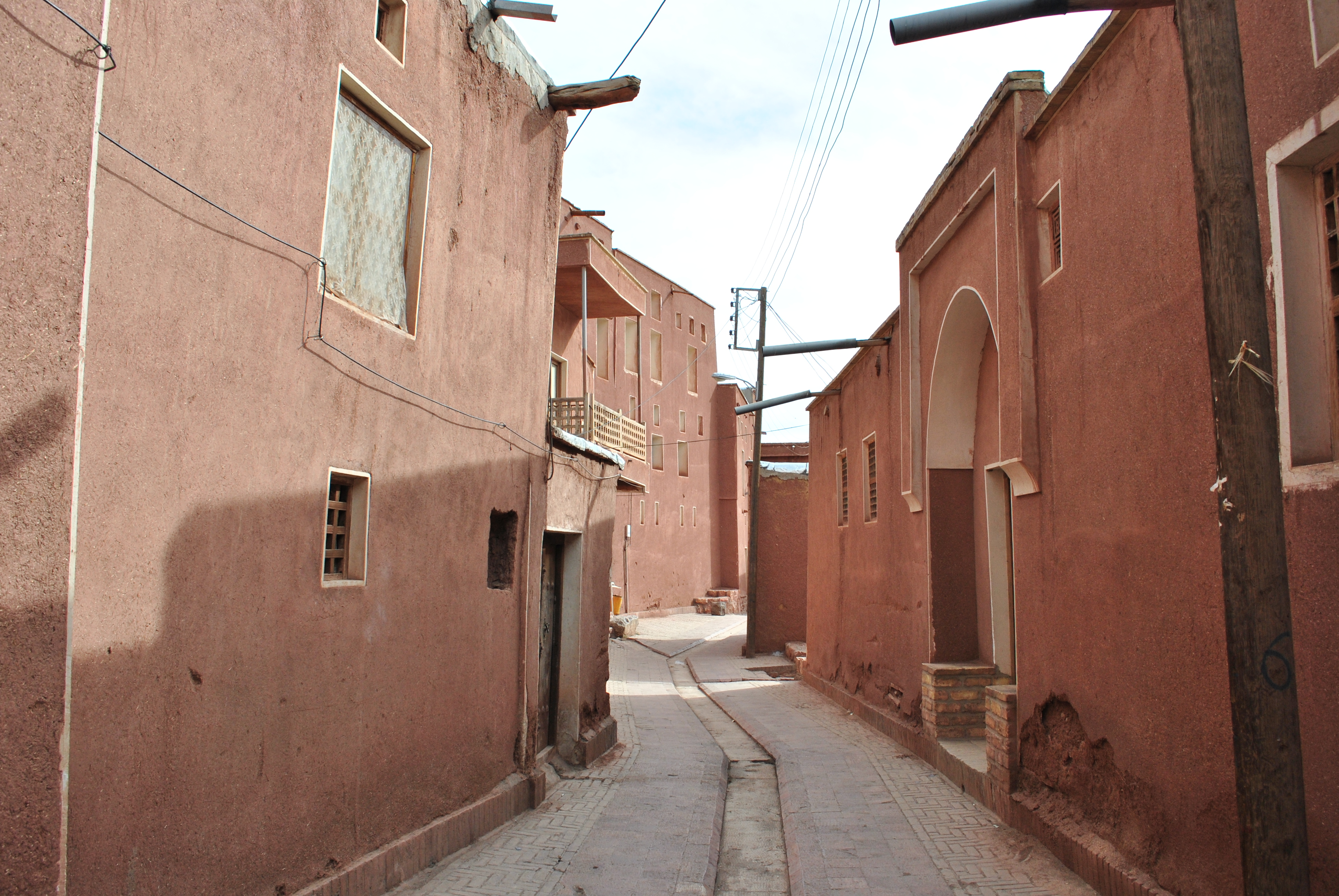
In the village

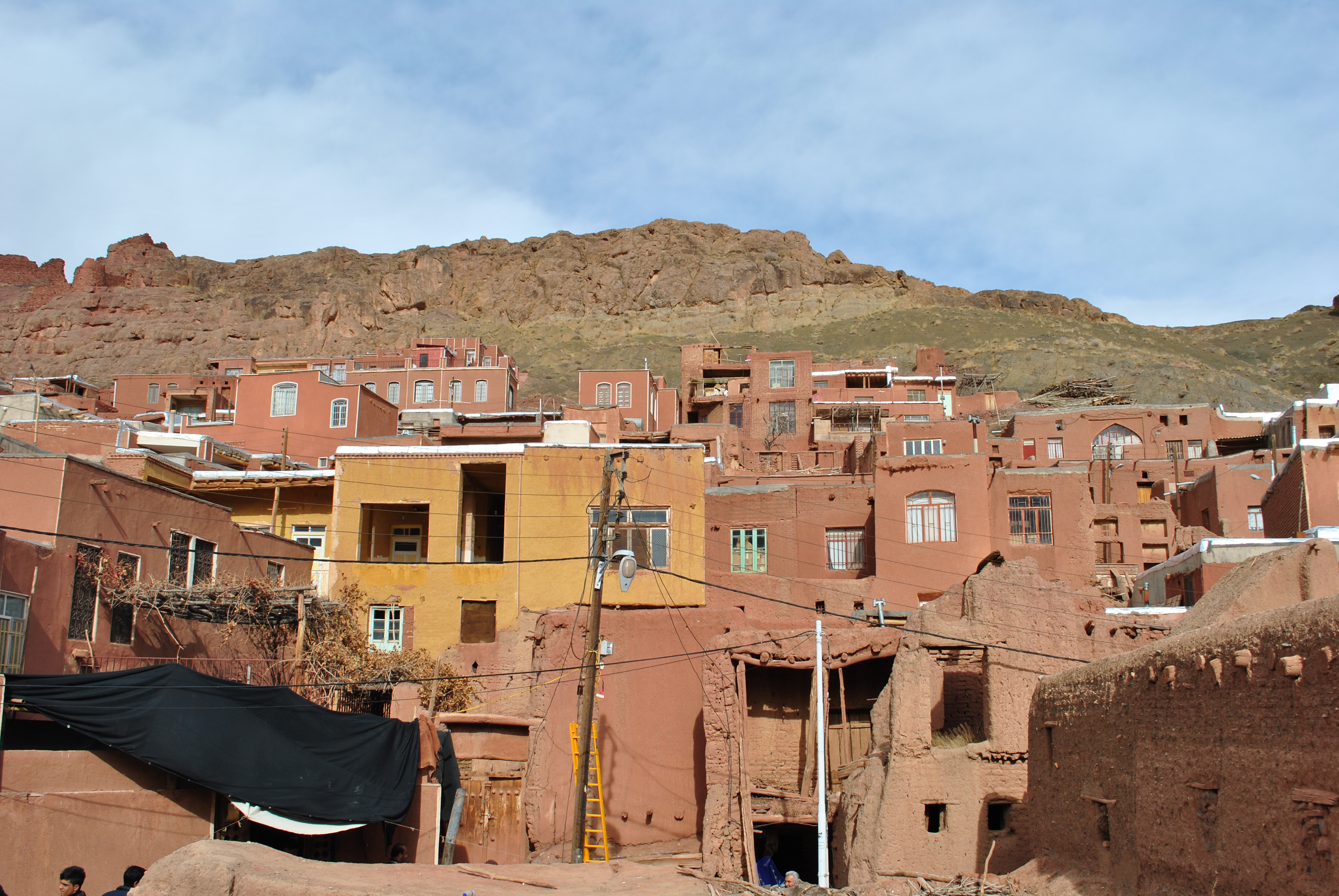
View of the traditional houses

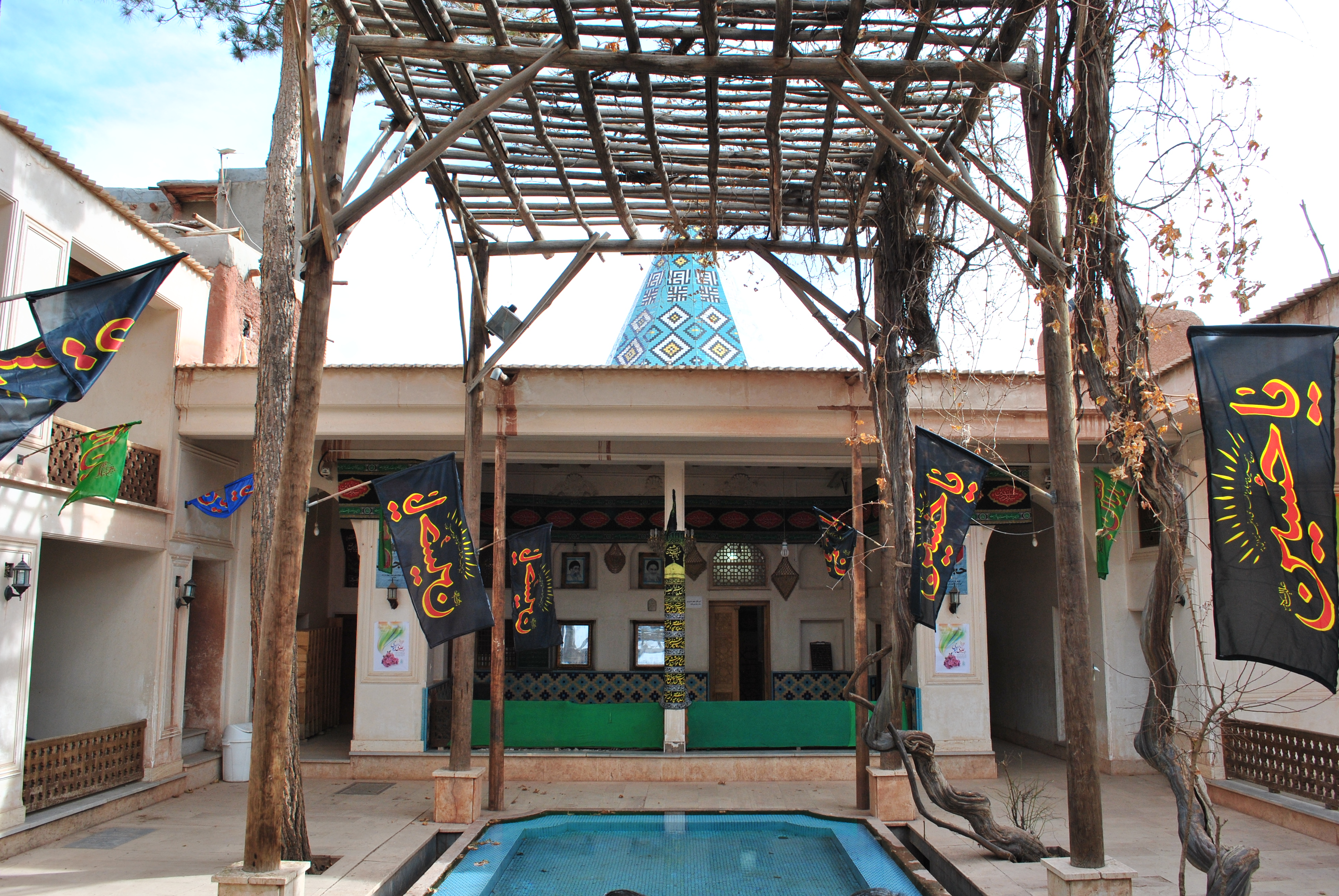
Inside of the imamzadeh shrine

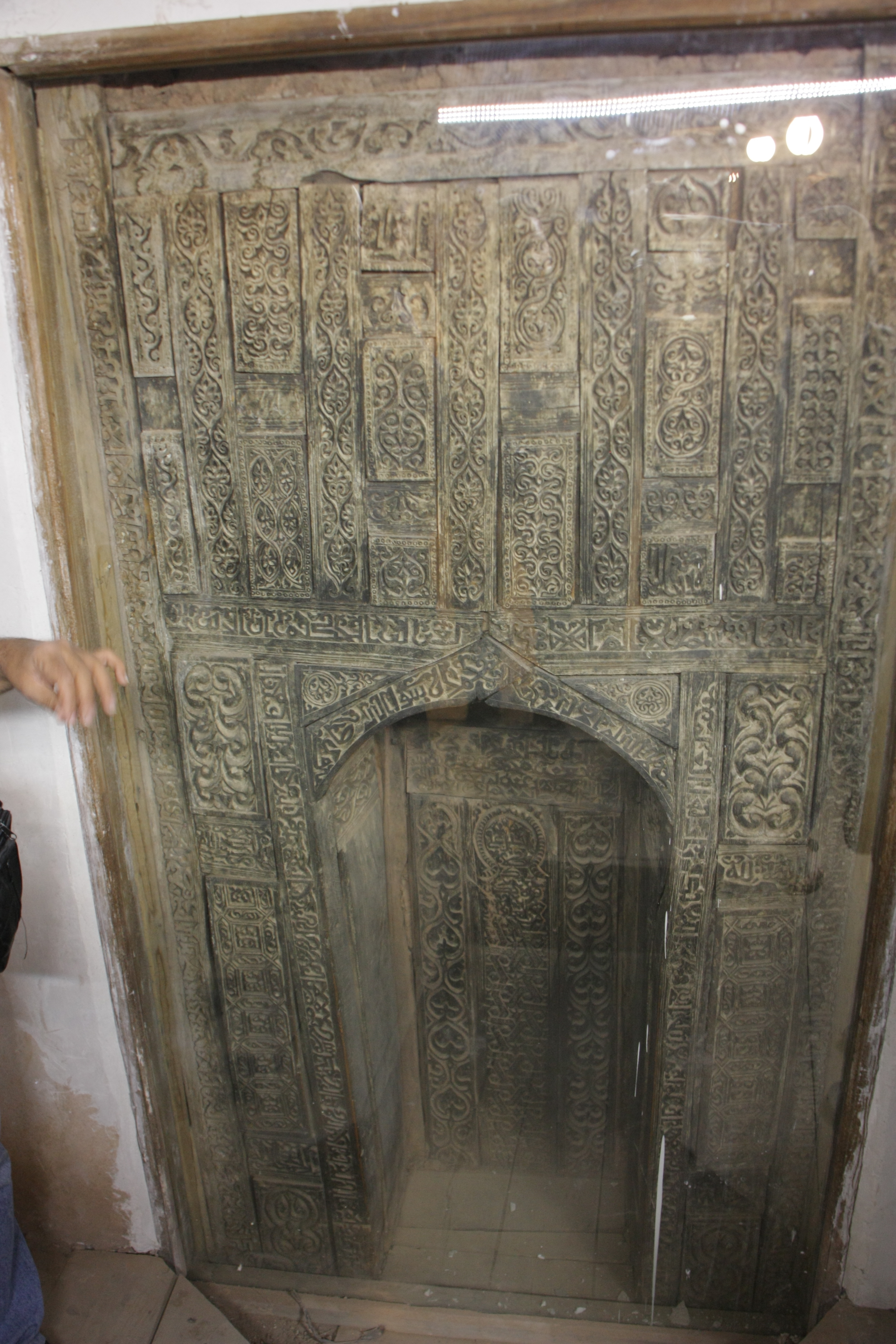
Mihrab of the friday mosche

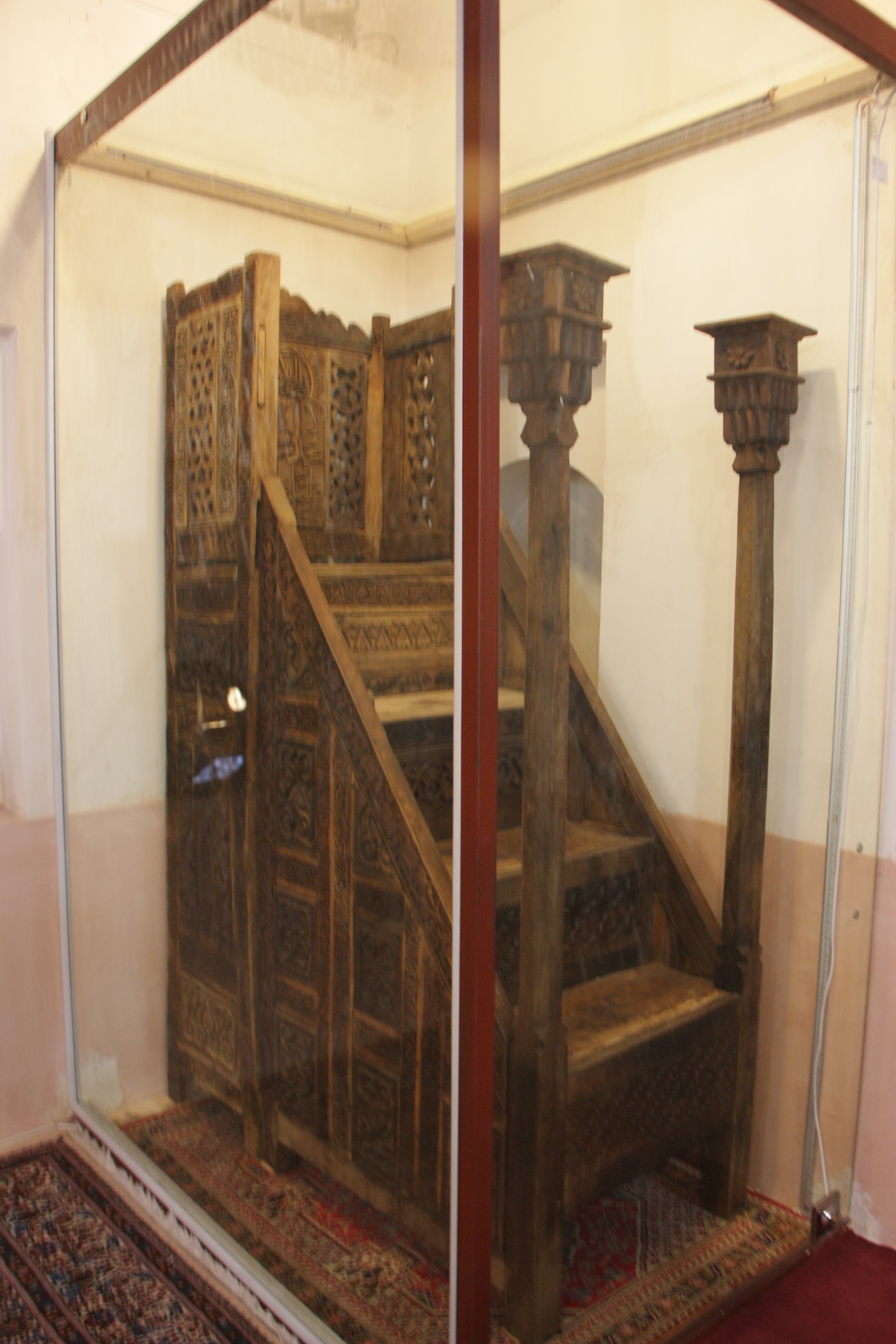
Minbar of the friday mosche

== See also ==
Media related to Abyaneh at Wikimedia Commons
