= COVID-19 pandemic in Gujarat =

Ongoing COVID-19 viral pandemic in Gujarat, India

- Disease: COVID-19
- Pathogen: SARS-CoV-2
- Location: Gujarat, India
- Index case: Rajkot and Surat
- Arrival date: 19 March 2020 (6 years, 5 months and 5 days)
- Confirmed cases: 8,25,710 (27/09/2021)
- Active cases: 142 (27/09/2021)
- Recovered: 8,15,489 (27/09/2021)
- Deaths: 19,964(27/09/2021)
- Fatality rate: 1.22% (13/12/2021)
- Territories: All 33 districts

Government website
- gujcovid19.gujarat.gov.in

In Gujarat, the first two cases of the COVID-19 pandemic were confirmed on 19 March 2020 in Rajkot and Surat.

== Timeline ==
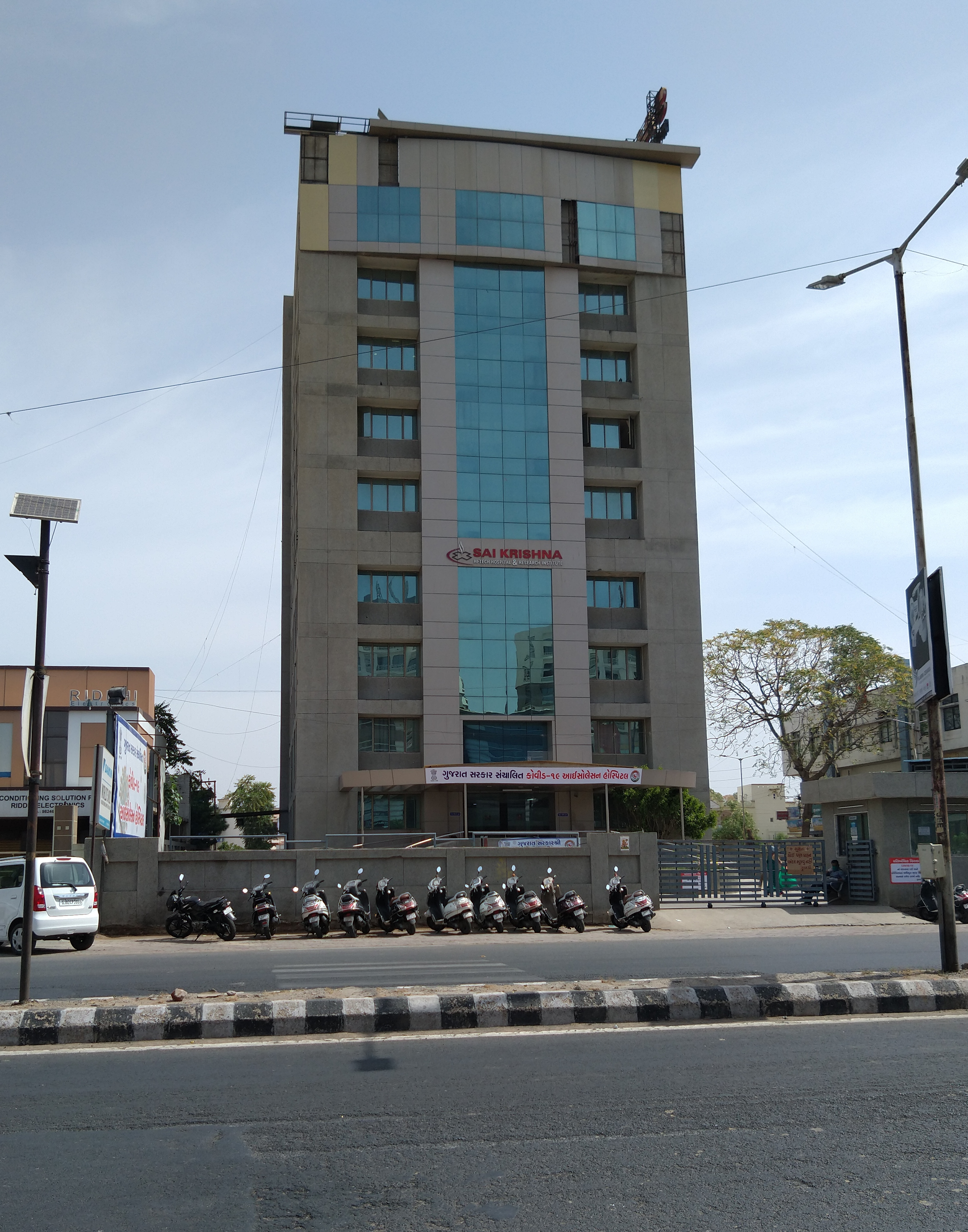
Sai Krishna Hospital as COVID-19 Isolation Centre; operated by Government of Gujarat in Mehsana, Gujarat, India

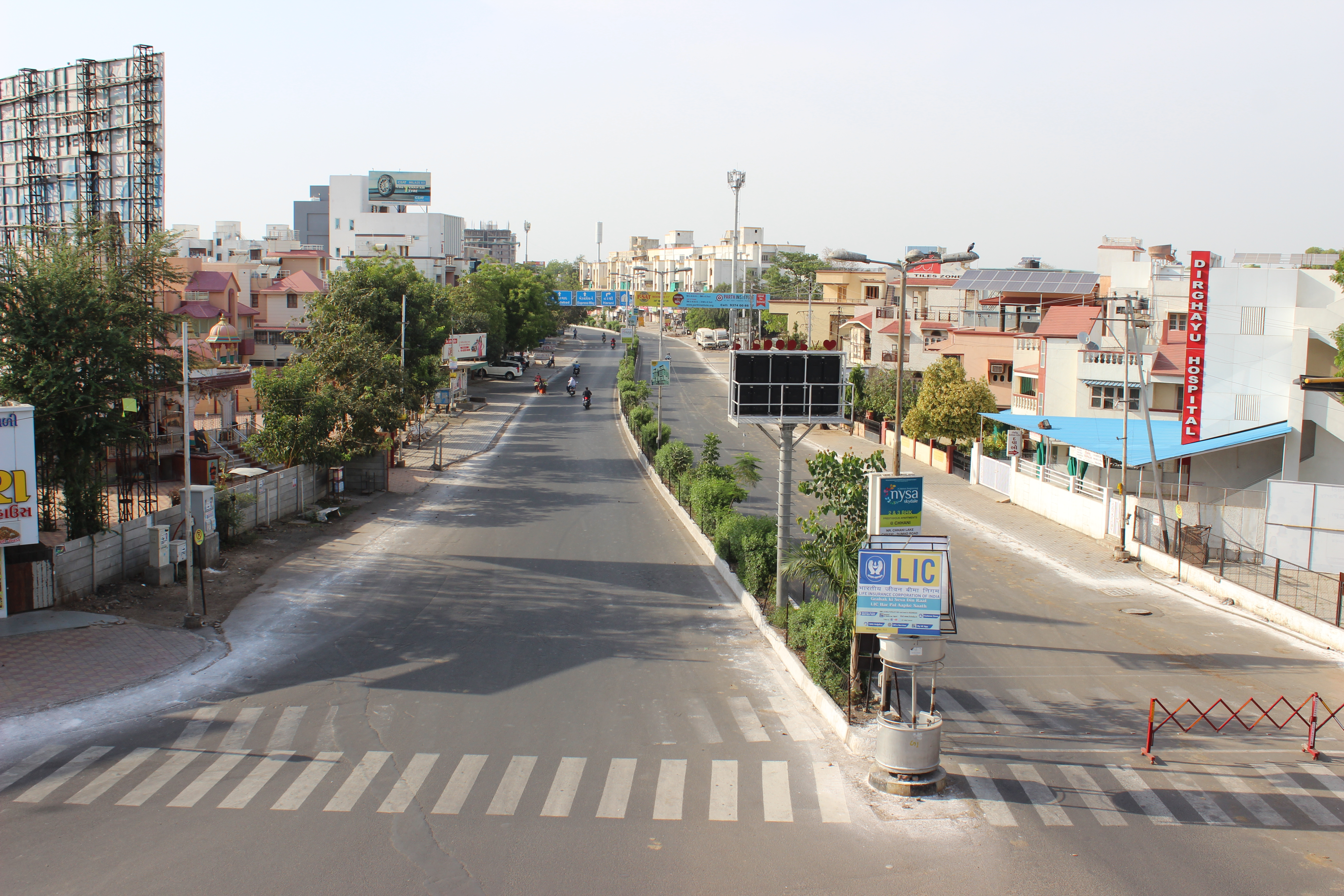
Deserted roads during the lockdown in Vadodara

=== March 2020 ===
- 15 March: Anil Mukim, Chief Secretary of Gujarat, announced the closure of schools, colleges, educational institutes, malls, multiplexes, and swimming pools across the state until March 29 as a precaution against COVID-19. However, the ongoing board examinations for class X and XII were allowed to be conducted. Also, fine of ₹500 was imposed on public spitting in Gujarat.
- 16 March: Shyamal Tikadar, Chief Wildlife Warden of Gujarat, announced that the state's national parks, sanctuaries, and conservation reserves will remain closed from March 17 to March 29. Gujarat High Court said it will only take up those matters categorized as urgent until March 31.
- 17 March: Statue of Unity closed for tourists until March 25. Platform ticket rate increased from ₹10 to ₹50 at 12 railway stations in Gujarat as a preventive measure against COVID-19 by the Western Railway of India.
- 18 March: Atul Pandya, Director of the Sabarmati Ashram in Ahmedabad said that the Ashram will remain closed for visitors from March 19 to March 29 to control the spread of COVID-19 and to ensure the safety of citizens.
- 19 March: Gujarat reports first two cases of COVID-19. A 32-year-old man from Rajkot, who returned from Saudi Arabia, and a 21-year-old woman from Surat, who returned from UK, were tested positive.
- 20 March: Vijay Rupani, Chief Minister of Gujarat, said no government buses in the state will be working on March 22 in view of the 'Janata Curfew' announced by Prime Minister Narendra Modi.
- 21 March: As COVID-19 cases increase in the state, Government of Gujarat partially locks down four cities - Ahmedabad, Surat, Vadodara and Rajkot. All shops selling non-essential items in the four cities will remain closed until March 25 and government offices will operate at half strength on rotational basis until March 29. Chief Minister Vijay Rupani announced that the new 1,200-bed capacity Civil Hospital of Ahmedabad will be kept exclusively for treating coronavirus patients and would serve as the nodal infection control centre.
- 22 March: Gujarat reports first COVID-19 death. A 69-year-old man died in Surat. Government of Gujarat extended the partial lockdown to Gandhinagar.
- 23 March: Gujarat DGP Shivanand Jha announced that entire Gujarat will be placed under complete lockdown starting from 12:00 AM of March 24 until March 31. The Gujarat High Court decided to hear "extremely urgent matters" through video conferencing, to ensure social distancing amid the COVID-19 pandemic.
- 24 March: Prime Minister Narendra Modi announced complete lockdown in entire country for 21 days starting from March 25 to April 14 as a preventive measure against the COVID-19. All businesses and services in India, except essential ones, were suspended during this period. The Government of Gujarat decided to mass-promote all the students of Class 1 to 9 and Class 11 to the upper standard without examination due to uncertainty over lockdown and spread of COVID-19 in Gujarat.
- 25 March: Gujarat reports second COVID-19 death. An 85-year-old woman who had returned from Dubai died in Ahmedabad. Chief Minister Vijay Rupani announced that Government of Gujarat would provide food items for free to 60 lakh poor families and 3.25 crore individuals holding ration cards from April 1.
- 26 March: Gujarat reports third COVID-19 death. A 70-year-old man died in Bhavnagar. Government of Gujarat announced free food doorstep facility for elderly persons staying alone at home during lockdown.
- 27 March: Out of 44 COVID-19 patients in Gujarat, 18 got infected through local transmission while the rest 26 had travel history. Government of Gujarat launched a mobile app to track home-quarantined persons and announced to provide food and accommodation to migrant workers but would restrict their travel during the 21-day lockdown period.
- 28 March: Number of cases in Gujarat crossed the 50-mark. Gujarat reports fourth COVID-19 death. A 46-year-old woman died in Ahmedabad. Chief Minister Vijay Rupani announced that the Government of Gujarat will grant Rs 25 lakh to the family of any police official who dies while on duty amid the COVID-19 pandemic.
- 29 March: Gujarat reports first COVID-19 recovery. A 34-year-old woman recovered in Surat. Gujarat reports fifth COVID-19 death. A 47-year-old man died in Ahmedabad. Gujarat ranks second in positive cases after Maharashtra, and ranks highest in mortality rate in India. Government of Gujarat said it will release around 1,200 prisoners for two months on parole and interim bail to reduce jail crowding.
- 30 March: Government of Gujarat has distributed 8.95 lakh food packets across the state to date. Out of total COVID-19 cases in Gujarat, around 50% cases are result of local transmission, 2 cases indicate community transmission.
- 31 March: Government of India identified Ahmedabad in Gujarat as a COVID-19 hotspot in the country as 3 patients have died out of total 5 cases in the city. Other hotspots in the country include Dilshad Garden and Nizamuddin in Delhi, Noida and Meerut in Uttar Pradesh, Bhilwara in Rajasthan, Kasargod and Pathanamthitta in Kerala, Mumbai and Pune in Maharashtra.

=== April 2020 ===
- 1 April: 72 persons from Gujarat who have attended the Tablighi Jamaat Event in Delhi's Nizamuddin area, which emerged as a major COVID-19 hotspot, were identified by Gujarat Police. Of them, 71 persons were quarantined; one of them died of COVID-19 in Bhavnagar. Gujarat Deputy Chief Minister Nitin Patel said that the deadline for the repayment of short-term crop loans has been extended until May 31.
- 2 April: Chief Minister Vijay Rupani announced ₹650 crore package for 65 lakh families of the poor, labourers, unorganised workers, construction workers of the state. Government of Gujarat warned factories, businesses and employers by saying that FIRs will be filed under the Disaster Management Act against those who would lay off workers or would cut their salaries during the lockdown period.
- 3 April: Ashwani Kumar, Secretary to Chief Minister Vijay Rupani, said that Government of Gujarat has decided to provide 25,000 N95 masks to private doctors in the state so that they can provide better healthcare facilities to people. Government of Gujarat initiated hiring of retired police personnel in order to deploy them as additional force to impose the lockdown across Gujarat.
- 4 April: Number of COVID-19 cases in Gujarat crossed the 100-mark. Number of COVID-19 deaths in Gujarat reached 10. Five of them died in Ahmedabad. Gujarat had increased the risk of local transmission. 62 cases out of total 105 were of local transmission. Chief Minister Vijay Rupani informed that there will be no shortage of ventilators in Gujarat as local industrialists in the state have successfully made ventilators in 10 days.
- 5 April: Number of COVID-19 cases in Ahmedabad crossed the 50-mark. Government of Gujarat announced ₹25 lakh compensation in case sanitation and health workers, revenue and food supplies staff, fair price shop owners die of COVID-19 while working in the frontline. The Ahmedabad Municipal Corporation (AMC) increased its COVID-19 survey team's strength to 500 from 136.
- 6 April: Government of Gujarat declared 15 localities in four cities - Ahmedabad (8), Surat (3), Bhavnagar (2) and Vadodara (2) - as COVID-19 hotspots in the state, and decided to completely seal the areas, under the cluster containment strategy. After successful launching and testing of Ventilators, Gujarat manufacturers would now make Personal Protective Equipment (PPE) kits and N95 Masks for being self-reliant to fight the battle against the COVID-19.
- 7 April: Government of Gujarat, which had earlier announced (on April 5) ₹25 lakh compensation to front-line staff, extended the cover to all government employees who are involved in jobs related to the COVID-19 pandemic.
- 8 April: Government of Gujarat declared 31 private hospitals across the state as designated COVID-19 hospitals. The 31 new hospitals will increase bed capacity for COVID-19 patients by 4,064. Earlier, the designated COVID-19 hospitals across the state were operational in Ahmedabad, Rajkot, Vadodara and Surat and had combined capacity of 2,200 beds.
- 9 April: Number of COVID-19 cases in Gujarat crossed the 200-mark. Number of COVID-19 cases in Ahmedabad crossed the 100-mark. Out of the total 241 cases in the state, 33 have international travel history, 32 have interstate travel history, and 176 were locally infected. Jayanti Ravi, Principal Secretary of Health and Family Welfare Department (Gujarat), said that Government of Gujarat has ordered for 50,000 Rapid Antibody Test (RAT) kits from abroad, in addition to kits to be received from the central government.
- 10 April: Number of COVID-19 cases in Gujarat crossed the 300-mark. Number of COVID-19 cases in Vadodara crossed the 50-mark.
- 11 April: Number of COVID-19 cases in Gujarat crossed the 400-mark. Number of COVID-19 deaths in Gujarat crossed the 20-mark. Number of COVID-19 cases in Ahmedabad crossed the 200-mark. Government of Gujarat allowed to operate fishing and allied activities of processing, packaging, maintenance of cold chains, and transportation of fish and prawns.
- 12 April: Number of COVID-19 cases in Gujarat crossed the 500-mark. Number of COVID-19 cases in Vadodara crossed the 100-mark. Ahmedabad Civic Body made it mandatory (from 6:00 AM of April 13) for people of Ahmedabad to wear mask or any cloth to cover the nose and mouth when going out in public places and said that those found without masks will be fined ₹5,000 and those who fail to deposit the fine will be jailed for 3 years.
- 13 April: Number of COVID-19 recoveries in Gujarat crossed the 50-mark. Number of COVID-19 cases in Ahmedabad crossed the 300-mark.
- 14 April: Prime Minister Narendra Modi announced the extension of lockdown in entire country for 19 days from April 15 to May 3. Number of COVID-19 cases in Gujarat crossed the 600-mark. In order to prevent the spread of COVID-19 in Ahmedabad, Chief Minister Vijay Rupani decided to impose curfew in three hotspot areas - Danilimda, Jamalpur and Dariyapur of Ahmedabad from 6:00 AM of April 15 to 6:00 AM of April 21. Ahmedabad Municipal Commissioner Vijay Nehra said that Ahmedabad Civic Body has readied the India's largest COVID-19 Care Centre in Ahmedabad with a capacity to accommodate 2000 patients.
- 15 April: Number of COVID-19 cases in Gujarat crossed the 700-mark. Number of COVID-19 deaths in Gujarat crossed the 30-mark. Number of COVID-19 cases in Ahmedabad crossed the 400-mark. Number of COVID-19 cases in Surat crossed the 50-mark. Out of 170 districts identified as COVID-19 hotspot in India, Gujarat has 5 hotspot districts - Ahmedabad, Vadodara, Surat, Bhavnagar, Rajkot.
- 16 April: Number of COVID-19 cases in Gujarat crossed the 900-mark. Number of COVID-19 cases in Ahmedabad crossed the 500-mark. Government of Gujarat has set up designated COVID-19 hospitals in all districts of Gujarat and now has 8700 bed capacity for COVID-19 patients.
- 17 April: Number of COVID-19 cases in Gujarat crossed the 1,000-mark. Number of COVID-19 deaths in Gujarat crossed the 40-mark. Number of COVID-19 cases in Ahmedabad crossed the 600-mark. Number of COVID-19 cases in Surat crossed the 100-mark.
- 18 April: Number of COVID-19 deaths in Gujarat crossed the 50-mark. Number of COVID-19 cases in Ahmedabad crossed the 800-mark. Ashwani Kumar, Secretary to Chief Minister Vijay Rupani, said that from April 20 NFSA card-holding families will get ₹1000 assistance for the month of April.
- 19 April: Number of COVID-19 recoveries in Gujarat crossed the 100-mark. Number of COVID-19 deaths in Gujarat crossed the 60-mark. Number of COVID-19 cases in Ahmedabad crossed the 1,000-mark. Number of COVID-19 cases in Surat crossed the 200-mark.
- 20 April: Number of COVID-19 deaths in Gujarat crossed the 70-mark.
- 21 April: Number of COVID-19 cases in Gujarat crossed the 2,000-mark. Number of COVID-19 deaths in Gujarat reached the 90-mark. Number of COVID-19 cases in Surat crossed the 300-mark. Gujarat becomes second worst affected state after Maharashtra in terms of total number of COVID-19 cases (2178) and total number of COVID-19 deaths (90).
- 22 April: Number of COVID-19 deaths in Gujarat crossed the 100-mark. Number of COVID-19 cases in Surat crossed the 400-mark. Number of COVID-19 cases in Vadodara crossed the 200-mark.
- 23 April: Number of COVID-19 recoveries in Gujarat crossed the 200-mark. Jayanti Ravi, Principal Secretary of Health and Family Welfare Department (Gujarat), said that Government of Gujarat is conducting 3,000 COVID-19 tests everyday in Gujarat. Out of these, 2,500 samples are collected from across the state while 500 samples are of those who are already quarantined or admitted to hospitals.
- 24 April: The Ministry of Home Affairs (MHA) sent four interministerial teams, headed by Additional Secretary-level officers, to monitor the COVID-19 situation in Gujarat (Ahmedabad, Surat), Telangana (Hyderabad) and Tamil Nadu (Chennai). The ministry had previously sent six teams to Maharashtra, Madhya Pradesh, Rajasthan and West Bengal. Government of Gujarat started using the Rapid Antibody Test (RAT) kits for COVID-19 surveillance in the state.
- 25 April: Number of COVID-19 cases in Gujarat crossed the 3,000-mark. Number of COVID-19 cases in Ahmedabad crossed the 2,000-mark. Ashwani Kumar, Secretary to Chief Minister Vijay Rupani, said that shops across all the districts of Gujarat, except those located in COVID-19 containment zones, malls and shopping complexes, will be allowed to open from April 26.
- 26 April: Number of COVID-19 recoveries in Gujarat crossed the 300-mark. Number of COVID-19 cases in Surat crossed the 500-mark. Number of COVID-19 deaths in Ahmedabad crossed the 100-mark. Ashwani Kumar, Secretary to Chief Minister Vijay Rupani, said that Government of Gujarat has withdrawn the decision to open shops in four cities - Ahmedabad, Surat, Vadodara, Rajkot, and informed that only essential services will continue until May 3.
- 27 April: Number of COVID-19 cases in Anand crossed the 50-mark. 30 out of 33 districts in Gujarat have reported COVID-19 cases so far.
- 28 April: Number of COVID-19 recoveries in Gujarat crossed the 400-mark. Number of COVID-19 cases in Rajkot crossed the 50-mark.
- 29 April: Number of COVID-19 cases in Gujarat crossed the 4,000-mark. Number of COVID-19 recoveries in Gujarat crossed the 500-mark. Number of COVID-19 cases in Surat crossed the 600-mark. Ahmedabad Municipal Commissioner Vijay Nehra said that Ahmedabad Municipal Corporation (AMC) has started distributing 3.5 lakh masks and sanitizers to the vegetable vendors free of cost and from May 1 it is mandatory for vegetable vendors and shop keepers in Ahmedabad to wear masks. Those who won't wear masks will have to pay a fine (₹2,000 fine for vendors, ₹5,000 for shop keepers, ₹50,000 for super market owners) and will also lead to suspension of licence for three months under Shops and Establishments Act.
- 30 April: Number of COVID-19 recoveries in Gujarat crossed the 600-mark. Number of COVID-19 deaths in Gujarat crossed the 200-mark. Number of COVID-19 cases in Ahmedabad crossed the 3,000-mark.

=== May 2020 ===
- 1 May: Number of COVID-19 recoveries in Gujarat crossed the 700-mark. Number of COVID-19 cases in Vadodara crossed the 300-mark.
- 2 May: Number of COVID-19 cases in Gujarat crossed the 5,000-mark. Number of COVID-19 recoveries in Gujarat crossed the 800-mark. Number of COVID-19 cases in Gandhinagar crossed the 50-mark. Number of COVID-19 cases in Bhavnagar crossed the 50-mark. Number of COVID-19 recoveries in Ahmedabad crossed the 400-mark.
- 3 May: Lockdown extended in entire country for 2 weeks from May 4 to May 17 with considerable relaxations. Number of COVID-19 recoveries in Gujarat crossed the 1,000-mark. Number of COVID-19 recoveries in Ahmedabad crossed the 500-mark. Number of COVID-19 deaths in Ahmedabad crossed the 200-mark.
- 4 May: Number of COVID-19 deaths in Gujarat crossed the 300-mark. Number of COVID-19 cases in Ahmedabad crossed the 4,000-mark. Number of COVID-19 cases in Surat crossed the 700-mark. Number of COVID-19 recoveries in Ahmedabad crossed the 600-mark.
- 5 May: Number of COVID-19 cases in Gujarat crossed the 6,000-mark. Number of COVID-19 cases in Vadodara crossed the 400-mark. Number of COVID-19 recoveries in Ahmedabad crossed the 700-mark.
- 6 May: Number of COVID-19 recoveries in Gujarat reached the 1,500-mark. Number of COVID-19 cases in Panchmahal crossed the 50-mark. Number of COVID-19 cases in Banaskantha crossed the 50-mark. The Ahmedabad Municipal Corporation Commissioner ordered that all shops in Ahmedabad, except for those shops providing essential items like milk and medical stores, will remain closed from 12 am on May 7 to 6 am on May 15.
- 7 May: Number of COVID-19 tests carried out in Gujarat crossed the 1,00,000-mark. Number of COVID-19 cases in Gujarat crossed the 7,000-mark. Number of COVID-19 deaths in Gujarat crossed the 400-mark. Number of COVID-19 recoveries in Ahmedabad crossed the 800-mark. Number of COVID-19 deaths in Ahmedabad crossed the 300-mark.
- 8 May: Number of COVID-19 cases in Ahmedabad crossed the 5,000-mark. Number of COVID-19 recoveries in Ahmedabad crossed the 1,000-mark. Number of COVID-19 cases in Surat crossed the 800-mark.
- 9 May: Number of COVID-19 recoveries in Gujarat crossed the 2,000-mark. Number of COVID-19 cases in Gandhinagar crossed the 100-mark.
- 10 May: Number of COVID-19 cases in Gujarat crossed the 8,000-mark. Number of COVID-19 cases in Vadodara crossed the 500-mark.
- 11 May: Number of COVID-19 deaths in Gujarat crossed the 500-mark. Number of COVID-19 cases in Ahmedabad crossed the 6,000-mark. Number of COVID-19 deaths in Ahmedabad reached the 400-mark. The Ahmedabad Municipal Corporation (AMC) made cashless digital payment mandatory for all home deliveries in Ahmedabad after May 15 in order to prevent the spread of COVID-19 through currency notes. The AMC also said that all delivery staff will have to download Aarogya Setu app on their mobile phones as it would help users of the app identify whether they are at risk of the COVID-19 infection.
- 12 May: Number of COVID-19 recoveries in Gujarat crossed the 3,000-mark.
- 13 May: Number of COVID-19 cases in Gujarat crossed the 9,000-mark. Number of COVID-19 recoveries in Ahmedabad crossed the 2,000-mark.
- 14 May: Number of COVID-19 cases in Vadodara crossed the 600-mark.
- 15 May: Number of COVID-19 recoveries in Gujarat crossed the 4,000-mark. Number of COVID-19 deaths in Gujarat crossed the 600-mark. Number of COVID-19 cases in Ahmedabad crossed the 7,000-mark. Number of COVID-19 cases in Surat crossed the 1,000-mark.
- 16 May: Number of COVID-19 cases in Gujarat crossed the 10,000-mark. Number of COVID-19 cases in Ahmedabad crossed the 8,000-mark.
- 17 May: Number of COVID-19 cases in Gujarat crossed the 11,000-mark. Number of COVID-19 deaths in Ahmedabad crossed the 500-mark.
- 19 May: Number of COVID-19 cases in Gujarat crossed the 12,000-mark. Number of COVID-19 recoveries in Gujarat crossed the 5,000-mark. Number of COVID-19 deaths in Gujarat crossed the 700-mark. Number of COVID-19 cases in Vadodara reached the 700-mark. Number of COVID-19 recoveries in Ahmedabad crossed the 3,000-mark.
- 20 May: Number of COVID-19 cases in Ahmedabad crossed the 9,000-mark. Number of COVID-19 deaths in Ahmedabad crossed the 600-mark.
- 22 May: Number of COVID-19 cases in Gujarat crossed the 13,000-mark. Number of COVID-19 deaths in Gujarat crossed the 800-mark.
- 23 May: Number of COVID-19 recoveries in Gujarat crossed the 6,000-mark. Number of COVID-19 cases in Ahmedabad crossed the 10,000-mark. Number of COVID-19 cases in Vadodara crossed the 800-mark.
- 24 May: Number of COVID-19 cases in Gujarat crossed the 14,000-mark. Number of COVID-19 recoveries in Ahmedabad crossed the 4,000-mark.
- 25 May: Number of COVID-19 deaths in Ahmedabad crossed the 700-mark.
- 26 May: Number of COVID-19 recoveries in Gujarat crossed the 7,000-mark. Number of COVID-19 deaths in Gujarat crossed the 900-mark. Number of COVID-19 cases in Aravalli crossed the 100-mark. Number of COVID-19 cases in Banaskantha crossed the 100-mark. Number of COVID-19 cases in Jamnagar crossed the 50-mark.
- 27 May: Number of COVID-19 cases in Gujarat crossed the 15,000-mark. Number of COVID-19 cases in Ahmedabad crossed the 11,000-mark.
- 28 May: Number of COVID-19 recoveries in Gujarat crossed the 8,000-mark. Number of COVID-19 recoveries in Ahmedabad crossed the 5,000-mark. Number of COVID-19 recoveries in Surat crossed the 1,000-mark.
- 29 May: Number of COVID-19 tests carried out in Gujarat crossed the 2,00,000-mark.
- 30 May: The Ministry of Home Affairs (MHA) announced the 'Unlock 1' in entire country for 30 days starting from June 1 to June 30. It is actually a lockdown extension, termed as 'unlock' as it will focus on reopening of economic activities in the country in a phased manner. During this period, lockdown restrictions would only be imposed in containment zones, while economic activities would be permitted in other zones. Number of COVID-19 cases in Gujarat crossed the 16,000-mark. Number of COVID-19 recoveries in Gujarat crossed the 9,000-mark. Number of COVID-19 deaths in Gujarat crossed the 1,000-mark. Number of COVID-19 recoveries in Ahmedabad crossed the 6,000-mark. Number of COVID-19 deaths in Ahmedabad crossed the 800-mark. Number of COVID-19 cases in Vadodara crossed the 1,000-mark. Number of COVID-19 cases in Sabarkantha crossed the 100-mark.
- 31 May: Number of COVID-19 cases in Ahmedabad crossed the 12,000-mark.

=== June 2020 ===
- 1 June: Number of COVID-19 cases in Gujarat crossed the 17,000-mark. Number of COVID-19 recoveries in Gujarat crossed the 10,000-mark. Number of COVID-19 recoveries in Ahmedabad crossed the 7,000-mark. Number of COVID-19 cases in Anand crossed the 100-mark.
- 2 June: Number of COVID-19 recoveries in Gujarat crossed the 11,000-mark. Number of COVID-19 recoveries in Ahmedabad crossed the 8,000-mark.
- 3 June: Number of COVID-19 cases in Gujarat crossed the 18,000-mark. Number of COVID-19 recoveries in Gujarat crossed the 12,000-mark. Number of COVID-19 cases in Ahmedabad crossed the 13,000-mark. Number of COVID-19 deaths in Ahmedabad crossed the 900-mark.
- 4 June: Number of COVID-19 recoveries in Ahmedabad crossed the 9,000-mark. Number of COVID-19 recoveries in Vadodara crossed the 700-mark. Chief Minister Vijay Rupani announced 'Gujarat Atmanirbhar' package of ₹14,000 crore to help revive the state economy.
- 5 June: Number of COVID-19 cases in Gujarat crossed the 19,000-mark. Number of COVID-19 recoveries in Gujarat crossed the 13,000-mark.
- 6 June: Number of COVID-19 cases in Surat crossed the 2,000-mark.
- 7 June: Number of COVID-19 cases in Gujarat crossed the 20,000-mark. Number of COVID-19 cases in Ahmedabad crossed the 14,000-mark. Number of COVID-19 deaths in Ahmedabad crossed the 1,000-mark.
- 8 June: Number of COVID-19 recoveries in Ahmedabad crossed the 10,000-mark.
- 9 June: Number of COVID-19 cases in Gujarat crossed the 21,000-mark. Number of COVID-19 recoveries in Gujarat crossed the 14,000-mark.
- 10 June: Number of COVID-19 cases in Ahmedabad crossed the 15,000-mark.
- 11 June: Number of COVID-19 cases in Gujarat crossed the 22,000-mark. Number of COVID-19 recoveries in Gujarat crossed the 15,000-mark.
- 12 June: Number of COVID-19 recoveries in Ahmedabad crossed the 11,000-mark.
- 13 June: Number of COVID-19 cases in Gujarat crossed the 23,000-mark. Number of COVID-19 cases in Ahmedabad crossed the 16,000-mark. Number of COVID-19 cases in Surat crossed the 2,500-mark. Number of COVID-19 cases in Vadodara crossed the 1,500-mark.
- 14 June: Number of COVID-19 recoveries in Gujarat crossed the 16,000-mark.
- 15 June: Number of COVID-19 cases in Gujarat crossed the 24,000-mark. Number of COVID-19 deaths in Gujarat crossed the 1,500-mark.
- 16 June: Number of COVID-19 recoveries in Gujarat crossed the 17,000-mark. Number of COVID-19 cases in Ahmedabad crossed the 17,000-mark. Number of COVID-19 recoveries in Ahmedabad crossed the 12,000-mark.
- 17 June: Number of COVID-19 cases in Gujarat crossed the 25,000-mark. Number of COVID-19 tests carried out in Gujarat crossed the 3,00,000-mark.
- 19 June: Number of COVID-19 cases in Gujarat crossed the 26,000-mark. Number of COVID-19 recoveries in Gujarat crossed the 18,000-mark. Number of COVID-19 cases in Ahmedabad crossed the 18,000-mark.
- 20 June: Number of COVID-19 recoveries in Ahmedabad crossed the 13,000-mark. Number of COVID-19 cases in Surat crossed the 3,000-mark.
- 21 June: Number of COVID-19 cases in Gujarat crossed the 27,000-mark. Number of COVID-19 recoveries in Gujarat crossed the 19,000-mark.
- 22 June: Number of COVID-19 cases in Ahmedabad crossed the 19,000-mark. Number of COVID-19 recoveries in Ahmedabad crossed the 14,000-mark.
- 23 June: Number of COVID-19 cases in Gujarat crossed the 28,000-mark. Number of COVID-19 recoveries in Gujarat crossed the 20,000-mark.
- 24 June: Number of COVID-19 cases in Gujarat crossed the 29,000-mark. Number of COVID-19 recoveries in Gujarat crossed the 21,000-mark.
- 25 June: Number of COVID-19 recoveries in Ahmedabad crossed the 15,000-mark. Number of COVID-19 cases in Vadodara crossed the 2,000-mark.
- 26 June: Number of COVID-19 cases in Gujarat crossed the 30,000-mark. Number of COVID-19 recoveries in Gujarat crossed the 22,000-mark. Number of COVID-19 cases in Ahmedabad crossed the 20,000-mark. Number of COVID-19 cases in Surat crossed the 4,000-mark.
- 28 June: Number of COVID-19 cases in Gujarat crossed the 31,000-mark.
- 29 June: Number of COVID-19 cases in Gujarat crossed the 32,000-mark. Number of COVID-19 recoveries in Gujarat crossed the 23,000-mark.

=== July 2020 ===
- 1 July: Number of COVID-19 cases in Gujarat crossed the 33,000-mark. Number of COVID-19 recoveries in Gujarat crossed the 24,000-mark. Number of COVID-19 cases in Ahmedabad crossed the 21,000-mark. Number of COVID-19 recoveries in Ahmedabad crossed the 16,000-mark. Number of COVID-19 cases in Surat crossed the 5,000-mark.
- 3 July: Number of COVID-19 cases in Gujarat crossed the 34,000-mark.
- 4 July: Number of COVID-19 tests carried out in Gujarat crossed the 4,00,000-mark. Number of COVID-19 cases in Gujarat crossed the 35,000-mark. Number of COVID-19 recoveries in Gujarat crossed the 25,000-mark.
- 5 July: Number of COVID-19 cases in Gujarat crossed the 36,000-mark.
- 6 July: Number of COVID-19 recoveries in Gujarat crossed the 26,000-mark. Number of COVID-19 cases in Ahmedabad crossed the 22,000-mark. Number of COVID-19 recoveries in Ahmedabad crossed the 17,000-mark. Number of COVID-19 cases in Surat crossed the 6,000-mark. Number of COVID-19 recoveries in Surat crossed the 4,000-mark.
- 7 July: Number of COVID-19 cases in Gujarat crossed the 37,000-mark. Number of COVID-19 cases in Surat crossed the 7,000-mark.
- 8 July: Number of COVID-19 cases in Gujarat crossed the 38,000-mark. Number of COVID-19 recoveries in Gujarat crossed the 27,000-mark. Number of COVID-19 deaths in Ahmedabad crossed the 1,500-mark.
- 9 July: Number of COVID-19 cases in Gujarat crossed the 39,000-mark. Number of COVID-19 deaths in Gujarat crossed the 2,000-mark.
- 10 July: Number of COVID-19 cases in Gujarat crossed the 40,000-mark. Number of COVID-19 recoveries in Gujarat crossed the 28,000-mark.
- 11 July: Number of COVID-19 cases in Gujarat crossed the 41,000-mark. Number of COVID-19 cases in Surat crossed the 8,000-mark.
- 12 July: Number of COVID-19 recoveries in Gujarat crossed the 29,000-mark. Number of COVID-19 cases in Ahmedabad crossed the 23,000-mark. Number of COVID-19 cases in Vadodara crossed the 3,000-mark.
- 13 July: Number of COVID-19 cases in Gujarat crossed the 42,000-mark. Number of COVID-19 recoveries in Surat crossed the 5,000-mark.
- 14 July: Number of COVID-19 cases in Gujarat crossed the 43,000-mark. Number of COVID-19 recoveries in Gujarat crossed the 30,000-mark. Number of COVID-19 recoveries in Ahmedabad crossed the 18,000-mark.
- 15 July: Number of COVID-19 cases in Gujarat crossed the 44,000-mark. Number of COVID-19 recoveries in Gujarat crossed the 31,000-mark. Number of COVID-19 cases in Surat crossed the 9,000-mark.
- 16 July: Number of COVID-19 cases in Gujarat crossed the 45,000-mark. Number of COVID-19 recoveries in Gujarat crossed the 32,000-mark.
- 17 July: Number of COVID-19 tests carried out in Gujarat crossed the 5,00,000-mark. Number of COVID-19 cases in Gujarat crossed the 46,000-mark.
- 18 July: Number of COVID-19 cases in Gujarat crossed the 47,000-mark. Number of COVID-19 recoveries in Gujarat crossed the 34,000-mark. Number of COVID-19 cases in Ahmedabad crossed the 24,000-mark. Number of COVID-19 recoveries in Surat crossed the 6,000-mark.
- 19 July: Number of COVID-19 cases in Gujarat crossed the 48,000-mark. Number of COVID-19 recoveries in Ahmedabad crossed the 19,000-mark. Number of COVID-19 cases in Surat crossed the 10,000-mark.
- 20 July: Number of COVID-19 cases in Gujarat crossed the 49,000-mark. Number of COVID-19 recoveries in Gujarat crossed the 35,000-mark.
- 21 July: Number of COVID-19 cases in Gujarat crossed the 50,000-mark. Number of COVID-19 recoveries in Gujarat crossed the 36,000-mark.
- 22 July: Number of COVID-19 cases in Gujarat crossed the 51,000-mark. Number of COVID-19 recoveries in Gujarat crossed the 37,000-mark. Number of COVID-19 cases in Surat crossed the 11,000-mark. Number of COVID-19 recoveries in Surat crossed the 7,000-mark. Number of COVID-19 deaths in Surat crossed the 500-mark.
- 23 July: Number of COVID-19 cases in Gujarat crossed the 52,000-mark. Number of COVID-19 cases in Ahmedabad crossed the 25,000-mark.
- 24 July: Number of COVID-19 tests carried out in Gujarat crossed the 6,00,000-mark. Number of COVID-19 cases in Gujarat crossed the 53,000-mark. Number of COVID-19 recoveries in Gujarat crossed the 38,000-mark. Number of COVID-19 recoveries in Ahmedabad crossed the 20,000-mark.
- 25 July: Number of COVID-19 cases in Gujarat crossed the 54,000-mark. Number of COVID-19 recoveries in Gujarat crossed the 39,000-mark.
- 26 July: Number of COVID-19 cases in Gujarat crossed the 55,000-mark. Number of COVID-19 recoveries in Gujarat crossed the 40,000-mark. Number of COVID-19 cases in Surat crossed the 12,000-mark.
- 27 July: Number of COVID-19 cases in Gujarat crossed the 56,000-mark. Number of COVID-19 recoveries in Gujarat crossed the 41,000-mark.
- 28 July: Number of COVID-19 cases in Gujarat crossed the 57,000-mark. Number of COVID-19 recoveries in Gujarat crossed the 42,000-mark. Number of COVID-19 cases in Ahmedabad crossed the 26,000-mark. Number of COVID-19 recoveries in Ahmedabad crossed the 21,000-mark.
- 29 July: Number of COVID-19 tests carried out in Gujarat crossed the 7,00,000-mark. Number of COVID-19 cases in Gujarat crossed the 59,000-mark. Number of COVID-19 recoveries in Gujarat crossed the 43,000-mark. Number of COVID-19 cases in Surat crossed the 13,000-mark.
- 30 July: Number of COVID-19 cases in Gujarat crossed the 60,000-mark. Number of COVID-19 recoveries in Gujarat crossed the 44,000-mark.
- 31 July: Number of COVID-19 cases in Gujarat crossed the 61,000-mark.

=== August 2020 ===
- 1 August: Number of COVID-19 cases in Gujarat crossed the 62,000-mark. Number of COVID-19 recoveries in Gujarat crossed the 45,000-mark. Number of COVID-19 recoveries in Surat crossed the 9,000-mark.
- 2 August: Number of COVID-19 tests carried out in Gujarat crossed the 8,00,000-mark. Number of COVID-19 cases in Gujarat crossed the 63,000-mark. Number of COVID-19 recoveries in Gujarat crossed the 46,000-mark. Number of COVID-19 cases in Surat crossed the 14,000-mark.
- 3 August: Number of COVID-19 cases in Gujarat crossed the 64,000-mark. Number of COVID-19 recoveries in Gujarat crossed the 47,000-mark. Number of COVID-19 deaths in Gujarat crossed the 2,500-mark.
- 4 August: Number of COVID-19 cases in Gujarat crossed the 65,000-mark. Number of COVID-19 recoveries in Gujarat crossed the 48,000-mark. Number of COVID-19 cases in Ahmedabad crossed the 27,000-mark. Number of COVID-19 cases in Vadodara crossed the 5,000-mark.
- 5 August: Number of COVID-19 cases in Gujarat crossed the 66,000-mark. Number of COVID-19 recoveries in Gujarat crossed the 49,000-mark. Number of COVID-19 recoveries in Ahmedabad crossed the 22,000-mark.
- 6 August: Number of COVID-19 tests carried out in Gujarat crossed the 9,00,000-mark. Number of COVID-19 cases in Gujarat crossed the 67,000-mark. Number of COVID-19 recoveries in Gujarat crossed the 50,000-mark.
- 7 August: Number of COVID-19 cases in Gujarat crossed the 68,000-mark. Number of COVID-19 recoveries in Gujarat crossed the 51,000-mark.
- 8 August: Number of COVID-19 cases in Gujarat crossed the 69,000-mark. Number of COVID-19 recoveries in Gujarat crossed the 52,000-mark.
- 9 August: Number of COVID-19 cases in Gujarat crossed the 71,000-mark. Number of COVID-19 recoveries in Gujarat crossed the 54,000-mark.
- 10 August: Number of COVID-19 tests carried out in Gujarat crossed the 10,00,000-mark. Number of COVID-19 cases in Gujarat crossed the 72,000-mark. Number of COVID-19 recoveries in Gujarat crossed the 55,000-mark. Number of COVID-19 cases in Ahmedabad crossed the 28,000-mark.
- 11 August: Number of COVID-19 cases in Gujarat crossed the 73,000-mark. Number of COVID-19 recoveries in Gujarat crossed the 56,000-mark.
- 12 August: Number of COVID-19 tests carried out in Gujarat crossed the 11,00,000-mark. Number of COVID-19 cases in Gujarat crossed the 74,000-mark. Number of COVID-19 recoveries in Gujarat crossed the 57,000-mark. Number of COVID-19 recoveries in Ahmedabad crossed the 23,000-mark.
- 13 August: Number of COVID-19 cases in Gujarat crossed the 75,000-mark. Number of COVID-19 recoveries in Gujarat crossed the 58,000-mark.
- 14 August: Number of COVID-19 tests carried out in Gujarat crossed the 12,00,000-mark. Number of COVID-19 cases in Gujarat crossed the 76,000-mark. Number of COVID-19 recoveries in Gujarat crossed the 59,000-mark.
- 15 August: Number of COVID-19 cases in Gujarat crossed the 77,000-mark. Number of COVID-19 recoveries in Gujarat crossed the 60,000-mark.
- 16 August: Number of COVID-19 tests carried out in Gujarat crossed the 13,00,000-mark. Number of COVID-19 cases in Gujarat crossed the 78,000-mark. Number of COVID-19 recoveries in Gujarat crossed the 61,000-mark. Number of COVID-19 cases in Ahmedabad crossed the 29,000-mark.
- 17 August: Number of COVID-19 cases in Gujarat crossed the 79,000-mark. Number of COVID-19 recoveries in Gujarat crossed the 62,000-mark. Number of COVID-19 recoveries in Ahmedabad crossed the 24,000-mark.
- 18 August: Number of COVID-19 tests carried out in Gujarat crossed the 14,00,000-mark. Number of COVID-19 cases in Gujarat crossed the 80,000-mark. Number of COVID-19 recoveries in Gujarat crossed the 63,000-mark.
- 19 August: Number of COVID-19 cases in Gujarat crossed the 81,000-mark. Number of COVID-19 recoveries in Gujarat crossed the 64,000-mark.
- 20 August: Number of COVID-19 tests carried out in Gujarat crossed the 15,00,000-mark. Number of COVID-19 cases in Gujarat crossed the 83,000-mark. Number of COVID-19 recoveries in Gujarat crossed the 65,000-mark.
- 21 August: Number of COVID-19 tests carried out in Gujarat crossed the 16,00,000-mark. Number of COVID-19 cases in Gujarat crossed the 84,000-mark. Number of COVID-19 recoveries in Gujarat crossed the 67,000-mark.
- 22 August: Number of COVID-19 cases in Gujarat crossed the 85,000-mark. Number of COVID-19 recoveries in Gujarat crossed the 68,000-mark. Number of COVID-19 cases in Ahmedabad crossed the 30,000-mark.
- 23 August: Number of COVID-19 tests carried out in Gujarat crossed the 17,00,000-mark. Number of COVID-19 cases in Gujarat crossed the 86,000-mark. Number of COVID-19 recoveries in Gujarat crossed the 69,000-mark. Number of COVID-19 recoveries in Ahmedabad crossed the 25,000-mark.
- 24 August: Number of COVID-19 tests carried out in Gujarat crossed the 18,00,000-mark. Number of COVID-19 cases in Gujarat crossed the 87,000-mark. Number of COVID-19 recoveries in Gujarat crossed the 70,000-mark.
- 25 August: Number of COVID-19 cases in Gujarat crossed the 88,000-mark. Number of COVID-19 recoveries in Gujarat crossed the 71,000-mark.
- 26 August: Number of COVID-19 tests carried out in Gujarat crossed the 19,00,000-mark. Number of COVID-19 cases in Gujarat crossed the 89,000-mark. Number of COVID-19 recoveries in Gujarat crossed the 72,000-mark.
- 27 August: Number of COVID-19 tests carried out in Gujarat crossed the 20,00,000-mark. Number of COVID-19 cases in Gujarat crossed the 91,000-mark. Number of COVID-19 recoveries in Gujarat crossed the 73,000-mark.
- 28 August: Number of COVID-19 tests carried out in Gujarat crossed the 21,00,000-mark. Number of COVID-19 cases in Gujarat crossed the 92,000-mark. Number of COVID-19 recoveries in Gujarat crossed the 74,000-mark. Number of COVID-19 cases in Ahmedabad crossed the 31,000-mark.
- 29 August: Number of COVID-19 cases in Gujarat crossed the 93,000-mark. Number of COVID-19 recoveries in Gujarat crossed the 75,000-mark. Number of COVID-19 recoveries in Ahmedabad crossed the 26,000-mark.
- 30 August: Number of COVID-19 tests carried out in Gujarat crossed the 22,00,000-mark. Number of COVID-19 cases in Gujarat crossed the 95,000-mark. Number of COVID-19 recoveries in Gujarat crossed the 76,000-mark. Number of COVID-19 deaths in Gujarat crossed the 3,000-mark.
- 31 August: Number of COVID-19 tests carried out in Gujarat crossed the 23,00,000-mark. Number of COVID-19 cases in Gujarat crossed the 96,000-mark. Number of COVID-19 recoveries in Gujarat crossed the 77,000-mark.

=== September 2020 ===
- 1 September: Number of COVID-19 tests carried out in Gujarat crossed the 24,00,000-mark. Number of COVID-19 cases in Gujarat crossed the 97,000-mark. Number of COVID-19 recoveries in Gujarat crossed the 78,000-mark.
- 2 September: Number of COVID-19 cases in Gujarat crossed the 98,000-mark. Number of COVID-19 recoveries in Gujarat crossed the 79,000-mark.
- 3 September: Number of COVID-19 tests carried out in Gujarat crossed the 25,00,000-mark. Number of COVID-19 cases in Gujarat crossed the 1,00,000-mark. Number of COVID-19 recoveries in Gujarat crossed the 81,000-mark. Number of COVID-19 cases in Ahmedabad crossed the 32,000-mark.
- 4 September: Number of COVID-19 tests carried out in Gujarat crossed the 26,00,000-mark. Number of COVID-19 recoveries in Gujarat crossed the 82,000-mark.
- 5 September: Number of COVID-19 tests carried out in Gujarat crossed the 27,00,000-mark. Number of COVID-19 recoveries in Gujarat crossed the 83,000-mark.
- 6 September: Number of COVID-19 recoveries in Gujarat crossed the 84,000-mark.
- 7 September: Number of COVID-19 tests carried out in Gujarat crossed the 28,00,000-mark. Number of COVID-19 recoveries in Gujarat crossed the 85,000-mark.
- 8 September: Number of COVID-19 tests carried out in Gujarat crossed the 29,00,000-mark. Number of COVID-19 recoveries in Gujarat crossed the 87,000-mark. Number of COVID-19 recoveries in Ahmedabad crossed the 27,000-mark.
- 9 September: Number of COVID-19 recoveries in Gujarat crossed the 88,000-mark. Number of COVID-19 cases in Ahmedabad crossed the 33,000-mark.
- 10 September: Number of COVID-19 tests carried out in Gujarat crossed the 30,00,000-mark. Number of COVID-19 recoveries in Gujarat crossed the 90,000-mark.
- 11 September: Number of COVID-19 tests carried out in Gujarat crossed the 31,00,000-mark. Number of COVID-19 cases in Gujarat crossed the 1,10,000-mark. Number of COVID-19 recoveries in Gujarat crossed the 91,000-mark.
- 12 September: Number of COVID-19 tests carried out in Gujarat crossed the 32,00,000-mark. Number of COVID-19 recoveries in Gujarat crossed the 92,000-mark.
- 13 September: Number of COVID-19 recoveries in Gujarat crossed the 93,000-mark.
- 14 September: Number of COVID-19 tests carried out in Gujarat crossed the 33,00,000-mark. Number of COVID-19 recoveries in Gujarat crossed the 95,000-mark.
- 15 September: Number of COVID-19 tests carried out in Gujarat crossed the 34,00,000-mark. Number of COVID-19 recoveries in Gujarat crossed the 96,000-mark. Number of COVID-19 cases in Ahmedabad crossed the 34,000-mark. Number of COVID-19 recoveries in Ahmedabad crossed the 28,000-mark.
- 16 September: Number of COVID-19 tests carried out in Gujarat crossed the 35,00,000-mark. Number of COVID-19 recoveries in Gujarat crossed the 98,000-mark.
- 17 September: Number of COVID-19 tests carried out in Gujarat crossed the 36,00,000-mark. Number of COVID-19 recoveries in Gujarat crossed the 99,000-mark.
- 18 September: Number of COVID-19 cases in Gujarat crossed the 1,20,000-mark. Number of COVID-19 recoveries in Gujarat crossed the 1,00,000-mark.
- 19 September: Number of COVID-19 tests carried out in Gujarat crossed the 37,00,000-mark.
- 20 September: Number of COVID-19 recoveries in Ahmedabad crossed the 29,000-mark.
- 21 September: Number of COVID-19 tests carried out in Gujarat crossed the 38,00,000-mark. Number of COVID-19 cases in Ahmedabad crossed the 35,000-mark.
- 22 September: Number of COVID-19 tests carried out in Gujarat crossed the 39,00,000-mark.
- 24 September: Number of COVID-19 tests carried out in Gujarat crossed the 40,00,000-mark.
- 25 September: Number of COVID-19 tests carried out in Gujarat crossed the 41,00,000-mark. Number of COVID-19 cases in Gujarat crossed the 1,30,000-mark. Number of COVID-19 recoveries in Gujarat crossed the 1,10,000-mark.
- 26 September: Number of COVID-19 cases in Ahmedabad crossed the 36,000-mark.
- 27 September: Number of COVID-19 tests carried out in Gujarat crossed the 42,00,000-mark. Number of COVID-19 recoveries in Ahmedabad crossed the 30,000-mark.
- 29 September: Number of COVID-19 tests carried out in Gujarat crossed the 43,00,000-mark.
- 30 September: Number of COVID-19 tests carried out in Gujarat crossed the 44,00,000-mark.

=== October 2020 ===
- 1 October: Number of COVID-19 cases in Ahmedabad crossed the 37,000-mark. Number of COVID-19 recoveries in Ahmedabad crossed the 31,000-mark.
- 2 October: Number of COVID-19 tests carried out in Gujarat crossed the 45,00,000-mark.
- 3 October: Number of COVID-19 cases in Gujarat crossed the 1,40,000-mark. Number of COVID-19 recoveries in Gujarat crossed the 1,20,000-mark.
- 4 October: Number of COVID-19 tests carried out in Gujarat crossed the 46,00,000-mark.
- 5 October: Number of COVID-19 recoveries in Ahmedabad crossed the 32,000-mark.
- 6 October: Number of COVID-19 tests carried out in Gujarat crossed the 47,00,000-mark.
- 7 October: Number of COVID-19 tests carried out in Gujarat crossed the 48,00,000-mark. Number of COVID-19 cases in Ahmedabad crossed the 38,000-mark.
- 9 October: Number of COVID-19 tests carried out in Gujarat crossed the 49,00,000-mark. Number of COVID-19 recoveries in Ahmedabad crossed the 33,000-mark.
- 10 October: Number of COVID-19 cases in Gujarat crossed the 1,50,000-mark. Number of COVID-19 recoveries in Gujarat crossed the 1,30,000-mark.
- 11 October: Number of COVID-19 tests carried out in Gujarat crossed the 50,00,000-mark.
- 12 October: Number of COVID-19 cases in Ahmedabad crossed the 39,000-mark.
- 13 October: Number of COVID-19 tests carried out in Gujarat crossed the 51,00,000-mark.
- 14 October: Number of COVID-19 recoveries in Ahmedabad crossed the 34,000-mark.
- 15 October: Number of COVID-19 tests carried out in Gujarat crossed the 52,00,000-mark.
- 17 October: Number of COVID-19 tests carried out in Gujarat crossed the 53,00,000-mark. Number of COVID-19 recoveries in Gujarat crossed the 1,40,000-mark. Number of COVID-19 cases in Ahmedabad crossed the 40,000-mark.
- 19 October: Number of COVID-19 tests carried out in Gujarat crossed the 54,00,000-mark. Number of COVID-19 cases in Gujarat crossed the 1,60,000-mark. Number of COVID-19 recoveries in Ahmedabad crossed the 35,000-mark.
- 21 October: Number of COVID-19 tests carried out in Gujarat crossed the 55,00,000-mark.
- 22 November: Gujarat reports 22 new COVID cases in 24 hours.

== Testing ==
Summary of Test Results
Samples Tested	2,91,47,299
Positive	8,25,710
Positive %	2.83%
As of 27 September 2021

== Statistics ==
=== Table ===
COVID-19 pandemic in Gujarat by district
District	Total Cases	Active Cases	Total Recoveries	Total Deaths	Samples Tested	People in Quarantine
Ahmedabad	238203	24	234768	3411	5130012	33
Amreli	10810	0	10708	102	563765	80
Anand	9628	1	9578	49	495942	0
Aravalli	5186	0	5108	78	330977	0
Banaskantha	13631	0	13469	162	738094	0
Bharuch	11426	0	11308	118	478034	0
Bhavnagar	21441	8	21132	301	1126877	118
Botad	2218	0	2176	42	241722	0
Chhota Udaipur	3395	0	3357	38	238494	0
Dahod	9955	0	9917	38	654822	0
Dang	866	0	848	18	78814	389
Devbhoomi Dwarka	4175	0	4093	82	226597	20
Gandhinagar	20750	2	20543	205	787701	4
Gir Somnath	8566	4	8495	67	359607	4
Jamnagar	34966	4	34484	478	834764	71
Junagadh	20478	0	20207	271	754818	0
Kutch	12618	5	12468	145	793430	7
Kheda	10425	1	10376	48	582875	87
Mahisagar	8194	0	8122	72	357715	0
Mehsana	24416	0	24239	177	612293	0
Morbi	6502	0	6415	87	344377	0
Narmada	5953	0	5938	15	261477	0
Navsari	7171	6	7141	24	403229	38
Panchmahal	11770	0	11700	70	490976	0
Patan	11624	0	11495	129	433901	0
Porbandar	3486	2	3465	19	231821	5
Rajkot	57953	10	57218	725	1975618	49
Sabarkantha	9316	0	9159	157	462835	30
Surat	143677	27	141695	1955	6145805	550
Surendranagar	8121	0	7985	136	483429	0
Tapi	4440	0	4417	23	235970	46
Vadodara	78084	32	77264	788	1825238	45
Valsad	6266	16	6201	49	465270	14
Total	825710	142	815489	10079	29147299	1590
As of 27 September 2021

== See also ==
- COVID-19 pandemic in India
