= Hend (name) =

Hend is an Arabic given name and an occasional surname. It may refer to the following notable people:

Given name

- Hend Al-Mansour (born 1956), Saudi Arabian-American artist
- Hend bint Faisal Al-Qasimi (born 1984), Emirati princess
- Hend Kheera (born 1981), Egyptian street artist
- Hend Sabry (born 1979), Tunisian actress
- Hend Zaza (born 2009), Syrian table tennis player

Surname

- Scott Hend (born 1973), Australian golfer
