= Tarq Rud Rural District =

Rural district in Isfahan province, Iran

Tarq Rud Rural District Persian: دهستان طرق رود
- Rural District
- Location within Iran
- Coordinates: 33°22′N 51°48′E
- Country: Iran
- Province: Isfahan
- County: Natanz
- District: Central
- Established: 1987
- Capital: Tarqrud

Population (2016)
  - Total: 917
- Time zone: UTC+3:30 (IRST)

Tarq Rud Rural District (Persian: دهستان طرق رود) is in the Central District of Natanz County, Isfahan province, Iran. It is administered from the city of Tarqrud.

== Demographics ==
=== Population ===
At the time of the 2006 National Census, the rural district's population was 3,912 in 1,355 households. There were 4,170 inhabitants in 1,682 households at the following census of 2011. The 2016 census measured the population of the rural district as 917 in 375 households. The most populous of its 19 villages was Niyeh, with 299 people.

=== Other villages in the rural district ===
- Asiyab-e Kohneh
- Mezdeh
- Papakht
- Tar
- Varguran

=== Former villages now neighborhoods in the city of Tarq Rud ===
- Abkesheh
- Baghestan-e Bala
- Baghestan-e Pain
- Kesheh
- Yahyaabad
