= Tarqrud, Isfahan =

City in Isfahan province, Iran

Tarq Rud Persian: طرق‌رود
- City
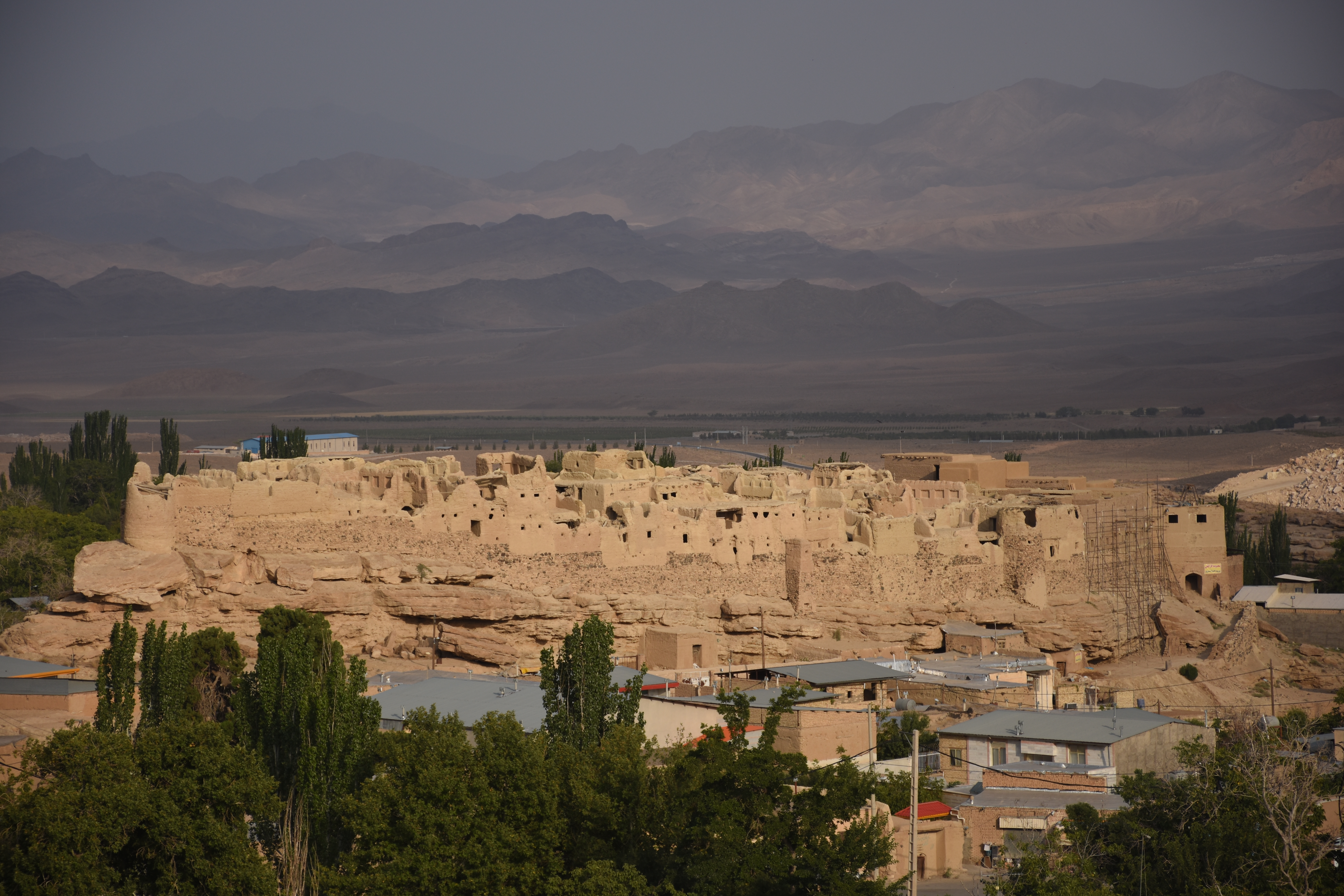
- Tarq Castle

- Location within Iran
- Coordinates: 33°21′11″N 51°47′55″E
- Country: Iran
- Province: Isfahan
- County: Natanz
- District: Central
- Established as a city: 2011

Population (2016)
  - Total: 1,749
- Time zone: UTC+3:30 (IRST)

Tarqrud (Persian: طرق‌رود) (Note: Also romanized as Tarq Rud and Ţarqrūd; formerly Tarq,) is a city in the Central District of Natanz County, Isfahan province, Iran, serving as the administrative center for Tarq Rud Rural District.

== Demographics ==
=== Population ===
At the time of the 2006 National Census, the population was 1,308 in 441 households, when it was the village of Tarq in Tarq Rud Rural District. The following census in 2011 counted 991 people in 458 households. The 2016 census measured the population as 1,749 people in 726 households, by which time the village, after merging with the villages of Abkesheh, Baghestan-e Bala, Baghestan-e Pain, Kesheh, and Yahyaabad, was converted to a city and renamed Tarqrud.
