= Golabad, Hamadan =

Golabad گل اباد
- Village
- Location within Iran
- Coordinates: 34°33′44″N 48°23′38″E
- Country: Iran
- Province: Hamadan
- County: Tuyserkan
- Bakhsh: Central
- Rural District: Hayaquq-e Nabi

Population (2006)
  - Total: 314
- Time zone: UTC+3:30 (IRST)
  - Summer (DST): UTC+4:30 (IRDT)

Golabad (Persian: گل اباد, also Romanized as Golābād; also known as Kalābād) is a village in Hayaquq-e Nabi Rural District, in the Central District of Tuyserkan County, Hamadan Province, Iran. At the 2006 census, its population was 314, in 114 families.
