= Karkas Rural District =

Rural district in Isfahan province, Iran

Karkas Rural District Persian: دهستان كركس
- Rural District
- Location within Iran
- Coordinates: 33°26′N 51°58′E
- Country: Iran
- Province: Isfahan
- County: Natanz
- District: Central
- Established: 1987
- Capital: Tameh

Population (2016)
  - Total: 1,934
- Time zone: UTC+3:30 (IRST)

Karkas Rural District (Persian: دهستان كركس) is in the Central District of Natanz County, Isfahan province, Iran. Its capital is the village of Tameh.

== Demographics ==
=== Population ===
At the time of the 2006 National Census, the rural district's population was 2,264 in 781 households. There were 1,872 inhabitants in 679 households at the following census of 2011. The 2016 census measured the population of the rural district as 1,934 in 810 households. The most populous of its 30 villages was Tameh, with 454 people.

=== Other villages in the rural district ===
- Jarian
- Khafr
- Milajerd
- Nosran
- Ureh
- Vishteh
