= Golabad, Fahraj =

Golabad گل اباد
- Village
- Location within Iran
- Coordinates: 28°47′22″N 59°07′44″E
- Country: Iran
- Province: Kerman
- County: Fahraj
- Bakhsh: Negin Kavir
- Rural District: Chahdegal

Population (2006)
  - Total: 187
- Time zone: UTC+3:30 (IRST)
  - Summer (DST): UTC+4:30 (IRDT)

Golabad (Persian: گل اباد, also Romanized as Golābād) is a village in Chahdegal Rural District, Negin Kavir District, Fahraj County, Kerman Province, Iran. At the 2006 census, its population was 187, in 46 families.
