= Golanabad =

Golanabad گلنااباد
- Village
- Location within Iran
- Coordinates: 29°40′27″N 56°17′50″E
- Country: Iran
- Province: Kerman
- County: Sirjan
- Bakhsh: Central
- Rural District: Chahar Gonbad

Population (2006)
  - Total: 98
- Time zone: UTC+3:30 (IRST)
  - Summer (DST): UTC+4:30 (IRDT)

Golanabad (Persian: گلنااباد, also Romanized as Golanābād, Golnā Ābād, and Golnābād; also known as Golābād) is a village in Chahar Gonbad Rural District, in the Central District of Sirjan County, Kerman Province, Iran. At the 2006 census, its population was 98, in 23 families.
