= Hend bint Faisal Al-Qasimi =

Emirati businesswoman

Hend bint Faisal Al Qasimi
- Born: 1982 (age 43–44); Sharjah, United Arab Emirates
- Arabic: هند بنت فيصل القاسمي
- Occupation: Businesswoman, writer

Sheikha Hend bint Faisal Al Qasimi (Arabic: هند بنت فيصل القاسمي; born 1984) is an Emirati royal. She became known in the press for her outspoken views against Islamophobic social media posts.

== Education ==
Al Qasimi studied Architecture at the American University of Sharjah, Entrepreneurship at the American University of Cairo, and studied Management, Marketing, Communications & Media at Celsa-Paris Sorbonne University.

== Career ==
As a businesswoman, Sheikha Hend is a published journalist within newspapers and international magazines, and an author of the book, The Black Book of Arabia and the Editor-in-Chief of a luxury fashion publication, Velvet Magazine. She sits on the advisory board at CFD Dubai, and International Dubai Fashion Week is under her Patronage. Other duties include being a Member of the Sharjah Chamber of Commerce, and she is also an active charity supporter

Al Qasimi condemned right wing Hindutva activists living in the UAE for their hateful social media posts against Muslims and Islam on Twitter. Islamophobic social media posts were targeting Muslims over a congregation of Tablighi Jamaat in New Delhi that was misleadingly blamed for increase in the number of COVID-19 cases in India.

Al Qasimi shared screenshots of the Islamophoic tweets and warned that racism and discrimination in the UAE will not be tolerated and expatriates who are Islamophobic will be made to leave the country, declaring that there is no room for religious intolerance in the UAE.

Speaking to news outlets, she stated "I have never heard an Indian attack an Arab or a Muslim before but now I have reported just one person but you can see my timeline is full of people insulting the Arabs, Muslims. This is so un-Indian." The Indian ambassador to the UAE Navdeep Suri reiterated her message and told her that her message has gone out "loud and clear".

The princess is also a vocal supporter for persecuted Uyghurs in China. In an April 2020 interview, she spoke out against the Xinjiang re-education camps and in support of persecuted Uyghurs.
