= Golabad, Sarab =

Golabad گل اباد
- Village
- Location within Iran
- Coordinates: 37°48′00″N 47°13′00″E
- Country: Iran
- Province: East Azerbaijan
- County: Sarab
- Bakhsh: Central
- Rural District: Abarghan

Population (2006)
  - Total: 329
- Time zone: UTC+3:30 (IRST)
  - Summer (DST): UTC+4:30 (IRDT)

Golabad (Persian: گل اباد, also Romanized as Golābād; also known as Monkerābād) is a village in Abarghan Rural District, in the Central District of Sarab County, East Azerbaijan Province, Iran. At the 2006 census, its population was 329, in 67 families.
