= Barzrud Rural District =

Rural district in Isfahan province, Iran

Barzrud Rural District Persian: دهستان برزرود
- Rural District
- Location within Iran
- Coordinates: 33°35′N 51°41′E
- Country: Iran
- Province: Isfahan
- County: Natanz
- District: Central
- Established: 1987
- Capital: Hanjan

Population (2016)
  - Total: 1,510
- Time zone: UTC+3:30 (IRST)

Barzrud Rural District (Persian: دهستان برزرود) is in the Central District of Natanz County, Isfahan province, Iran. Its capital is the village of Hanjan.

== Demographics ==
=== Population ===
At the time of the 2006 National Census, the rural district's population was 2,500 in 1,261 households. There were 2,443 inhabitants in 1,249 households at the following census of 2011. The 2016 census measured the population of the rural district as 1,510 in 710 households. The most populous of its 14 villages was Abyaneh, with 301 people.

=== Other villages in the rural district ===
- Barz
- Bid Hend
- Komjan
- Salehabad
- Tareh
- Tekyeh
