= Natanz County =

County in Isfahan province, Iran

Natanz County Persian: شهرستان نطنز
- County
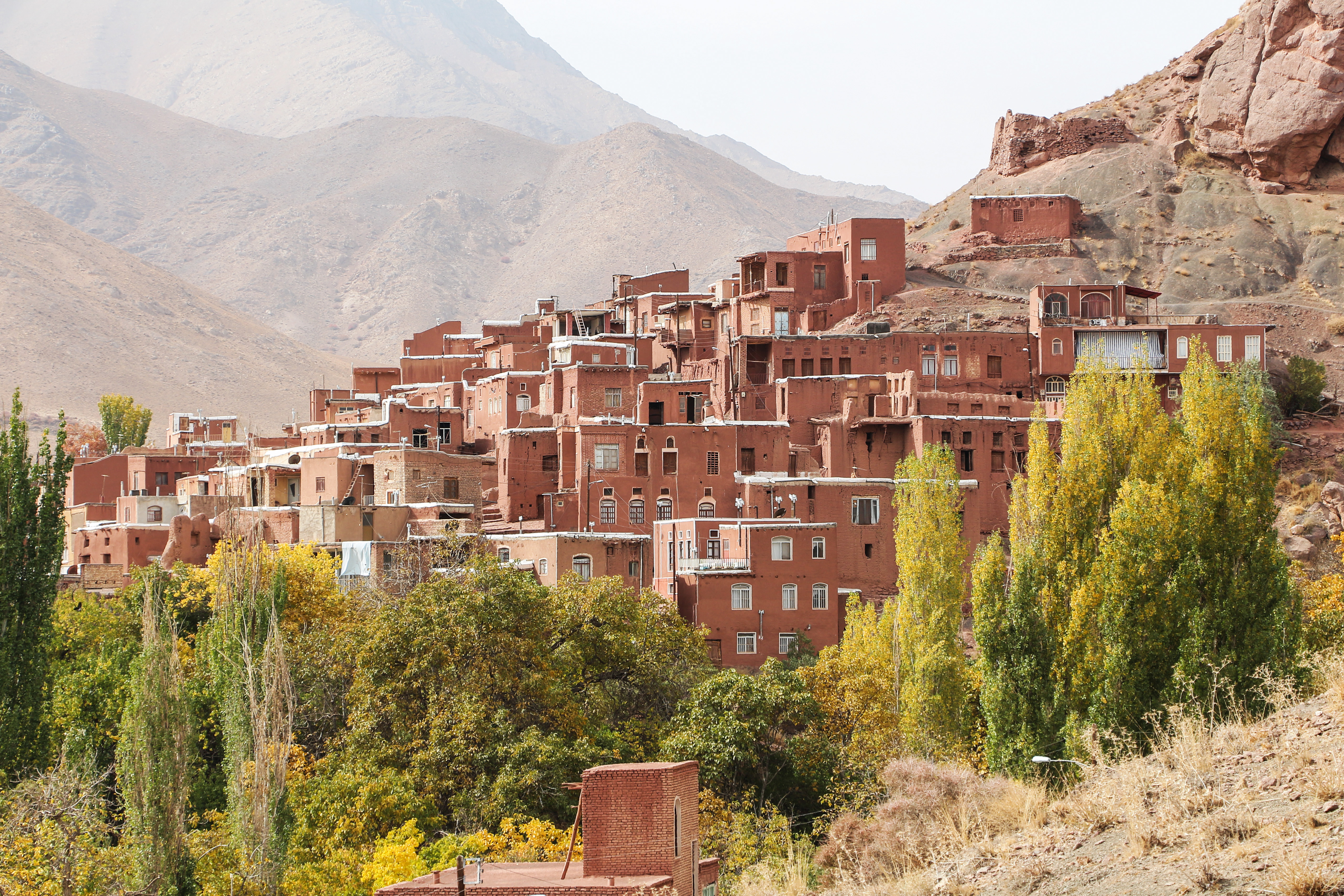
- The village of Abyaneh in Natanz County

- Location of Natanz County in Isfahan province (top center, green)

- Location of Isfahan province in Iran
- Coordinates: 33°35′N 51°49′E
- Country: Iran
- Province: Isfahan
- Capital: Natanz
- Districts: Central, Emamzadeh

Population (2016)
  - Total: 43,977
- Time zone: UTC+3:30 (IRST)

Natanz County (Persian: شهرستان نطنز) is in Isfahan province, Iran. Its capital is the city of Natanz.

== History ==
The village of Tarq, after merging with five other villages, was converted to a city and renamed Tarqrud in 2011.

== Demographics ==
=== Population ===
At the time of the 2006 National Census, the county's population was 43,947 in 12,802 households. The following census in 2011 counted 42,239 people in 13,873 households. The 2016 census measured the population of the county as 43,977 in 14,959 households.

=== Administrative divisions ===
Natanz County's population history and administrative structure over three consecutive censuses are shown in the following table.

Natanz County Population
Administrative Divisions	2006	2011	2016
Central District	20,736	20,766	20,232
Barzrud RD	2,500	2,443	1,510
Karkas RD	2,264	1,872	1,934
Tarq Rud RD	3,912	4,170	917
Natanz (city)	12,060	12,281	14,122
Tarqrud (city)			1,749
Emamzadeh District	23,211	21,473	23,745
Emamzadeh Aqaali Abbas RD	2,174	2,304	2,654
Khaledabad RD	3,338	3,293	3,345
Badrud (city)	14,391	13,120	14,723
Khaledabad (city)	3,308	2,756	3,023
Total	43,947	42,239	43,977
RD = Rural District

== See also ==
Media related to Natanz County at Wikimedia Commons
