= Central District (Natanz County) =

District in Isfahan province, Iran

Central District (Natanz County) Persian: بخش مرکزی شهرستان نطنز
- District
- Location within Iran
- Coordinates: 33°30′N 51°47′E
- Country: Iran
- Province: Isfahan
- County: Natanz
- Capital: Natanz

Population (2016)
  - Total: 20,232
- Time zone: UTC+3:30 (IRST)

The Central District of Natanz County (Persian: بخش مرکزی شهرستان نطنز) is in Isfahan province, Iran. Its capital is the city of Natanz.

== History ==
The village of Tarq, after merging with five other villages, was converted to a city and renamed Tarqrud in 2011.

== Demographics ==
=== Population ===
At the time of the 2006 census, the district's population was 20,736 in 6,808 households. The following census in 2011 counted 20,766 people in 7,439 households. The 2016 census measured the population of the district as 20,232 inhabitants in 7,185 households.

=== Administrative divisions ===
Central District (Natanz County) Population
Administrative Divisions	2006	2011	2016
Barzrud RD	2,500	2,443	1,510
Karkas RD	2,264	1,872	1,934
Tarq Rud RD	3,912	4,170	917
Natanz (city)	12,060	12,281	14,122
Tarqrud (city)			1,749
Total	20,736	20,766	20,232
RD = Rural District
