= Mehrabad, Lenjan =

Village in Isfahan province, Iran

Mehrabad Persian: مهرآباد
- Village
- Location within Iran
- Coordinates: 32°23′05″N 51°24′25″E
- Country: Iran
- Province: Isfahan
- County: Lenjan
- District: Fuladshahr
- Rural District: Ashiyan-e Shomali
- Time zone: UTC+3:30 (IRST)

Mehrabad (Persian: مهرآباد) is a village in, and the capital of, Ashiyan-e Shomali Rural District (Note: Formerly Ashiyan Rural District) in Fuladshahr District of Lenjan County, Isfahan province, Iran. The previous capital of the rural district was the village of Ashiyan, now in Ashiyan-e Jonubi Rural District.

== History ==
In 2012, Ashiyan (Note: Renamed Ashiyan-e Shomali Rural District) and Khorramrud Rural Districts, and the city of Fuladshahr, were separated from the Central District in the formation of Fuladshahr District.
