= Ashiyan =

Ashiyan or Ashian (Persian: اشيان), also rendered as Ishian, may refer to:

- Ashiyan, Gilan
- Ashiyan, Isfahan
- Ashiyan-e Jonubi Rural District, in Isfahan province
- Ashiyan-e Shomali Rural District (formerly Ashiyan Rural District), in Isfahan province

== See also ==
- Ashiana (disambiguation)
- Ashianeh (disambiguation)
- Ashiya (disambiguation)
- "Aashiyan", a song by Pritam, Nikhil Paul George and Shreya Ghoshal from the 2012 Indian film Barfi!
- Ashiyana, Lucknow, place in Uttar Pradesh, India
