= Sadeqabad, Lenjan =

Village in Isfahan province, Iran

Sadeqabad Persian: صادق اباد
- Village
- Location within Iran
- Coordinates: 32°17′59″N 51°19′00″E
- Country: Iran
- Province: Isfahan
- County: Lenjan
- District: Central
- Rural District: Kariz

Population (2016)
  - Total: 72
- Time zone: UTC+3:30 (IRST)

Sadeqabad (Persian: صادق اباد) (Note: Also romanized as Şādeqābād) is a village in Kariz Rural District of the Central District in Lenjan County, Isfahan province, Iran.

== Demographics ==
=== Population ===
At the time of the 2006 National Census, the village's population was 69 in 20 households, when it was in Ashiyan Rural District. (Note: Renamed Ashiyan-e Shomali Rural District) The following census in 2011 counted 78 people in 22 households. The 2016 census measured the population of the village as 72 people in 24 households.

In 2012, the rural district was transferred to the new Fuladshahr District and renamed Ashiyan-e Shomali Rural District. Sadeqabad was transferred to Kariz Rural District created in the Central District.
