= Kariz, Isfahan =

Village in Isfahan province, Iran

Kariz Persian: كاريز
- Village
- Location within Iran
- Coordinates: 32°17′12″N 51°18′47″E
- Country: Iran
- Province: Isfahan
- County: Lenjan
- District: Central
- Rural District: Kariz

Population (2016)
  - Total: 314
- Time zone: UTC+3:30 (IRST)

Kariz (Persian: كاريز) (Note: Also romanized as Kārīz) is a village in, and the capital of, Kariz Rural District in the Central District of Lenjan County, Isfahan province, Iran.

== Demographics ==
=== Population ===
At the time of the 2006 National Census, the village's population was 340 in 92 households, when it was in Ashiyan Rural District. (Note: Renamed Ashiyan-e Shomali Rural District) The following census in 2011 counted 363 people in 106 households. The 2016 census measured the population of the village as 314 people in 95 households.

In 2012, the rural district was transferred to the new Fuladshahr District and renamed Ashiyan-e Shomali Rural District. Kariz was transferred to Kariz Rural District created in the Central District.
