= Qaleh Pain =

Neighborhood in Isfahan province, Iran

Qaleh Pain Persian: قلعه پائين
- Neighborhood
- Location within Iran
- Country: Iran
- Province: Isfahan
- County: Lenjan
- District: Bagh-e Bahadoran
- City: Kachuiyeh

Population (2006)
  - Total: 288
- Time zone: UTC+3:30 (IRST)

Qaleh Pain (Persian: قلعه پائين) (Note: Also romanized as Qal‘eh Pā’īn) is a neighborhood in the city of Kachuiyeh in Bagh-e Bahadoran District of Lenjan County, Isfahan province, Iran.

== Demographics ==
=== Population ===
At the time of the 2006 National Census, Qaleh Pain's population was 288 in 80 households, when it was a village in Zirkuh Rural District (Note: Formerly Chermahin Rural District) After the census, the village was annexed by the city of Kachuiyeh.
