= Qoroq Aqa =

Village in Isfahan province, Iran

Qoroq Aqa Persian: قرق اقا
- Village
- Location within Iran
- Coordinates: 32°21′30″N 51°25′00″E
- Country: Iran
- Province: Isfahan
- County: Lenjan
- District: Central
- Rural District: Ashiyan-e Jonubi

Population (2016)
  - Total: 44
- Time zone: UTC+3:30 (IRST)

Qoroq Aqa (Persian: قرق اقا) (Note: Also romanized as Qoroq Āqā; also known as Qal‘eh-ye Qoroq and Qarqābād) is a village in Ashiyan-e Jonubi Rural District of the Central District in Lenjan County, Isfahan province, Iran.

== Demographics ==
=== Population ===
At the time of the 2006 National Census, the village's population was 62 in 17 households, when it was in Ashiyan Rural District. (Note: Renamed Ashiyan-e Shomali Rural District) The following census in 2011 counted 74 people in 25 households. The 2016 census measured the population of the village as 44 people in 16 households.

In 2012, the rural district was transferred to the new Fuladshahr District and renamed Ashiyan-e Shomali Rural District. Qoroq Aqa was transferred to Ashiyan-e Jonubi Rural District created in the Central District.
