= Bagh Shah, Isfahan =

Neighborhood in Isfahan province, Iran

Bagh Shah Persian: باغ شاه
- Neighborhood
- Country: Iran
- Province: Isfahan
- County: Lenjan
- District: Central
- City: Baghshad

Population (2011)
  - Total: 71
- Time zone: UTC+3:30 (IRST)

Bagh Shah (Persian: باغ شاه) is a neighborhood in the city of Baghshad in the Central District of Lenjan County, Isfahan province, Iran.

== Demographics ==
=== Population ===
At the time of the 2006 National Census, Bagh Shah's population was 81 in 19 households, when it was a village in Khorramrud Rural District. The following census in 2011 counted 71 people in 21 households.

The villages of Bagh Shah, Madiseh, and Now Guran were merged to form the city of Baghshad in 2013.
