= Allahabad, Lenjan =

Village in Isfahan province, Iran

Allahabad Persian: اله آباد
- Village
- Location within Iran
- Coordinates: 32°19′N 51°21′E
- Country: Iran
- Province: Isfahan
- County: Lenjan
- District: Fuladshahr
- Rural District: Ashiyan-e Shomali

Population (2011)
  - Total: 338
- Time zone: UTC+3:30 (IRST)

Allahabad (Persian: اله آباد) (Note: Also romanized as Allāhābād; also known as Mobārakābād) is a village in Ashiyan-e Shomali Rural District (Note: Formerly Ashiyan Rural District) of Fuladshahr District in Lenjan County, Isfahan province, Iran.

== Demographics ==
=== Population ===
At the time of the 2006 National Census, the village's population was 435 in 109 households, when it was in Ashiyan Rural District (Note: Renamed Ashiyan-e Shomali Rural District) of the Central District. The following census in 2011 counted 338 people in 86 households. The village did not appear in the 2016 census.

In 2012, the rural district was separated from the district in the formation of Fuladshahr District and renamed Ashiyan-e Shomali Rural District.
