= Madiseh =

Neighborhood in Isfahan province, Iran

Madiseh Persian: مَديسه
- Neighborhood
- Location within Iran
- Coordinates: 32°22′30″N 51°13′59″E
- Country: Iran
- Province: Isfahan
- County: Lenjan
- District: Central
- City: Baghshad

Population (2011)
  - Total: 1,395
- Time zone: UTC+3:30 (IRST)

Madiseh (Persian: مَديسه) (Note: Also romanized as Madīseh; also known as Qal‘eh Sādāt) is a neighborhood in the city of Baghshad in the Central District of Lenjan County, Isfahan province, Iran.

== Demographics ==
=== Population ===
At the time of the 2006 National Census, Madiseh's population was 1,647 in 384 households, when it was a village in Khorramrud Rural District. The following census in 2011 counted 1,395 people in 421 households.

The villages of Bagh Shah, Madiseh, and Now Guran were merged to form the city of Baghshad in 2013.

== Notable people ==
- Abu l-Hasan al-Isfahani, Former Iranian Grand Ayatollah
