= Now Guran =

Neighborhood in Isfahan province, Iran

Now Guran Persian: نوگوران
- Neighborhood
- Location within Iran
- Coordinates: 32°23′05″N 51°13′39″E
- Country: Iran
- Province: Isfahan
- County: Lenjan
- District: Central
- City: Baghshad

Population (2011)
  - Total: 3,213
- Time zone: UTC+3:30 (IRST)

Now Guran (Persian: نوگوران) (Note: Also romanized as Now Gūrān) is a neighborhood in the city of Baghshad in the Central District of Lenjan County, Isfahan province, Iran.

== Demographics ==
=== Population ===
At the time of the 2006 National Census, Now Guran's population was 3,196 in 837 households, when it was a village in Khorramrud Rural District. The following census in 2011 counted 3,213 people in 925 households.

The villages of Bagh Shah, Madiseh and Now Guran were merged to form the city of Baghshad in 2013.
