= Mobarakabad, Isfahan =

Village in Isfahan province, Iran

Mobarakabad Persian: مبارك اباد
- Village
- Location within Iran
- Country: Iran
- Province: Isfahan
- County: Lenjan
- District: Fuladshahr
- Rural District: Ashiyan-e Shomali

Population (2016)
  - Total: 950
- Time zone: UTC+3:30 (IRST)

Mobarakabad (Persian: مبارک‌آباد) (Note: Also romanized as Mobārakābād) is a village in Ashiyan-e Shomali Rural District (Note: Formerly Ashiyan Rural District) of Fuladshahr District in Lenjan County, Isfahan province, Iran.

== Demographics ==
=== Population ===
At the time of the 2006 National Census, the village's population was 17 in 11 households, when it was in Ashiyan Rural District (Note: Renamed Ashiyan-e Shomali Rural District) of the Central District. The following census in 2011 counted 419 people in 126 households. The 2016 census measured the population of the village as 950 people in 279 households.

In 2012, the rural district was separated from the district in the formation of Fuladshahr District and renamed Ashiyan-e Shomali Rural District.
