= Kerchkan =

Kerchkan or Karchekan or Karchakan (Persian: كرچكان) may refer to:

- Karchekan, Isfahan
- Kerchkan, Kerman
