= Yal Boland =

Village in Isfahan province, Iran

Yal Boland Persian: يال بلند
- Village
- Location within Iran
- Coordinates: 32°24′08″N 51°00′23″E
- Country: Iran
- Province: Isfahan
- County: Lenjan
- District: Bagh-e Bahadoran
- Rural District: Cham Kuh

Population (2016)
  - Total: 40
- Time zone: UTC+3:30 (IRST)

Yal Boland (Persian: يال بلند) (Note: Also romanized as Yāl Boland; also known as Qal‘eh Sangī and Qārā Darreh) is a village in Cham Kuh Rural District of Bagh-e Bahadoran District in Lenjan County, Isfahan province, Iran.

== Demographics ==
=== Population ===
At the time of the 2006 National Census, the village's population was 104 in 22 households. The village did not appear in the following census of 2011. The 2016 census measured the population of the village as 40 people in 12 households.
