= Cham-e Pir =

Village in Isfahan province, Iran

Cham-e Pir Persian: چم پير
- Village
- Location within Iran
- Coordinates: 32°23′32″N 51°10′00″E
- Country: Iran
- Province: Isfahan
- County: Lenjan
- District: Bagh-e Bahadoran
- Rural District: Cham Rud

Population (2016)
  - Total: 2,313
- Time zone: UTC+3:30 (IRST)

Cham-e Pir (Persian: چم پير) (Note: Also romanized as Cham Pīr and Cham-e Pīr) is a village in Cham Rud Rural District of Bagh-e Bahadoran District in Lenjan County, Isfahan province, Iran.

== Demographics ==
=== Population ===
At the time of the 2006 National Census, the village's population was 236 in 64 households. The following census in 2011 counted 167 people in 46 households. The 2016 census measured the population of the village as 131 people in 44 households.
