= List of former Shia clerics =

This is a list of prominent former Shi'a clerics, jurists, and scholars who have formally transitioned to Sunni Islam or adopted non-denominational Islamic frameworks.

While there is a common assumption that high-ranking Shi'a seminary scholars rarely depart from established religious doctrine, historically and in the modern era, a notable number of classically trained Shi'a religious figures including Grand Ayatollahs, Ayatollah, Mujtahids, and seminary intellectuals have migrated away from orthodox Twelver or Zaydi theology.

The individuals are categorized below by their scholarly rank and seminary qualifications.

== Grand Ayatollahs and High Mujtahids ==
- Grand Ayatollah Hussein al-Mu'ayyad: A prominent Iraqi cleric who achieved the highest level of unrestricted ijtihad before denouncing Shiism and converting entirely to Sunni Islam (Ahl al-Sunnah wal-Jama'ah).
- Grand Ayatollah Mohammad Sadeqi Tehrani: An Iranian scholar possessing both traditional seminary ijtihad and modern doctoral degrees, who shifted to a strictly non-denominational, Quran-only methodology, closely aligned with Sunni methodology.
- Grand Ayatollah Mohammad Javad Gharavi: An eminent Iranian cleric who rejected traditional seminary teachings in favor of a rationalist, Quran-first methodology, distancing himself from sectarianism.

== Ayatollahs and Senior Clerics ==
- Ayatollah Abolfazl Borqei: A highly credentialed Iranian cleric from the seminaries of Qom who completely abandoned Shiism for a non-denominational and Salafi/Sunni methodology.
- Ayatollah Sayyid Asadullah Kharaqani: A pioneer of the Iranian constitutional era who achieved the rank of ijtihad and migrated toward a Quran-centric, non-denominational framework.
- Classically Trained Cleric Mohammad Hasan Shariat Sanglaji: A scholar who rejected esoteric doctrines in favor of a non-denominational, Sunni-leaning rationalist framework.

== Clerics, Jurists, and Exegetes ==
- Dr. Musa al-Musawi: A cleric and grandson of a revered Grand Ayatollah who abandoned traditional practices to advocate for reconciling Shi'a history with Sunni orthodoxy.
- Former Cleric / Researcher Ahmad al-Katib: An Iraqi intellectual who embraced a Sunni and democratic-caliphate worldview.
- Sayyid Syed Nazeer Husain Dehlawi: Born into an aristocratic Shi'a family, he abandoned his faith to become the foundational cleric of the strict Sunni Ahl-i Hadith movement in South Asia.
- Eminent Jurist Al-Shawkani: A Yemeni scholar who transitioned from Zaydi Shiism to a Sunni methodology based on independent reasoning.
- Scholar Muqbil al-Wadi'i: A Yemeni scholar who left his Zaydi Shi'a background to become a highly prominent Salafi-Sunni cleric.

== Seminary-Trained Scholars and Intellectuals ==
- Scholar / Writer Haydar Ali Qalamdaran: A prolific thinker in Qom who dismantled Shi'a political theology and aligned his religious practices with classical Sunni thought.
- Quranic Exegete Yousef Sha'ar: The founder of a localized Quranic circle in Tabriz who adopted Sunni-leaning interpretations and bypassed traditional Shi'a Hadith.
- Scholar / Intellectual Mostafa Hosseini Tabatabaei: An influential Iranian thinker who advocated for a purified, non-denominational Islam that naturally aligns with Sunni orthopraxy.
