= Zamanabad, Lenjan =

Village in Isfahan province, Iran

Zamanabad Persian: زمان اباد
- Village
- Location within Iran
- Coordinates: 32°18′44″N 51°14′45″E
- Country: Iran
- Province: Isfahan
- County: Lenjan
- District: Bagh-e Bahadoran
- Rural District: Zirkuh

Population (2016)
  - Total: 1,000
- Time zone: UTC+3:30 (IRST)

Zamanabad (Persian: زمان اباد) (Note: Also romanized as Zamānābād) is a village in Zirkuh Rural District (Note: Formerly Chermahin Rural District) of Bagh-e Bahadoran District in Lenjan County, Isfahan province, Iran.

== Demographics ==
=== Population ===
At the time of the 2006 National Census, the village's population was 1,042 in 219 households. The following census in 2011 counted 1,070 people in 268 households. The 2016 census measured the population of the village as 1,000 people in 268 households.
