= Shurjeh, Lenjan =

Village in Isfahan province, Iran

Shurjeh Persian: شورجه
- Village
- Location within Iran
- Coordinates: 32°22′04″N 51°13′25″E
- Country: Iran
- Province: Isfahan
- County: Lenjan
- District: Bagh-e Bahadoran
- Rural District: Zirkuh

Population (2016)
  - Total: 70
- Time zone: UTC+3:30 (IRST)

Shurjeh (Persian: شورجه) (Note: Also romanized as Shūrjeh; also known as Shūrcheh and Sūrjeh) is a village in Zirkuh Rural District (Note: Formerly Chermahin Rural District) of Bagh-e Bahadoran District in Lenjan County, Isfahan province, Iran.

== Demographics ==
=== Population ===
At the time of the 2006 National Census, the village's population was 71 in 17 households. The following census in 2011 counted 67 people in 20 households. The 2016 census measured the population of the village as 70 people in 24 households.
