= Khoshuiyeh =

Village in Isfahan province, Iran

Khoshuiyeh Persian: خشوئيه
- Village
- Location within Iran
- Coordinates: 32°25′40″N 51°06′21″E
- Country: Iran
- Province: Isfahan
- County: Lenjan
- District: Bagh-e Bahadoran
- Rural District: Cham Rud

Population (2016)
  - Total: 135
- Time zone: UTC+3:30 (IRST)

Khoshuiyeh (Persian: خشوئيه) (Note: Also romanized as Khoshū’īeh and Khoshū’īyeh; also known as Khowshū’īyeh and Zard Khoshū’īyeh) is a village in Cham Rud Rural District of Bagh-e Bahadoran District in Lenjan County, Isfahan province, Iran.

== Demographics ==
=== Population ===
At the time of the 2006 National Census, the village's population was 193 in 56 households. The following census in 2011 counted 101 people in 37 households. The 2016 census measured the population of the village as 135 people in 50 households.
