= Zard Khoshuiyeh =

Village in Isfahan province, Iran

Zard Khoshuiyeh Persian: زردخشوييه
- Village
- Location within Iran
- Coordinates: 32°26′06″N 51°05′10″E
- Country: Iran
- Province: Isfahan
- County: Lenjan
- District: Bagh-e Bahadoran
- Rural District: Cham Rud

Population (2016)
  - Total: 372
- Time zone: UTC+3:30 (IRST)

Zard Khoshuiyeh (Persian: زردخشوييه) (Note: Also romanized as Zard Khoshū’īyeh) is a village in Cham Rud Rural District of Bagh-e Bahadoran District in Lenjan County, Isfahan province, Iran.

== Demographics ==
=== Population ===
At the time of the 2006 National Census, the village's population was 452 in 117 households. The following census in 2011 counted 403 people in 121 households. The 2016 census measured the population of the village as 372 people in 118 households.
