= Qaleh Aqa =

Village in Isfahan province, Iran

Qaleh Aqa Persian: قلعه اقا
- Village
- Location within Iran
- Coordinates: 32°21′10″N 51°06′14″E
- Country: Iran
- Province: Isfahan
- County: Lenjan
- District: Bagh-e Bahadoran
- Rural District: Zirkuh

Population (2016)
  - Total: 419
- Time zone: UTC+3:30 (IRST)

Qaleh Aqa (Persian: قلعه اقا) (Note: Also romanized as Qal‘eh Āqā; also known as Qal‘eh Āghā) is a village in Zirkuh Rural District (Note: Formerly Chermahin Rural District) of Bagh-e Bahadoran District in Lenjan County, Isfahan province, Iran.

== Demographics ==
=== Population ===
At the time of the 2006 National Census, the village's population was 370 in 104 households. The following census in 2011 counted 419 people in 133 households. The 2016 census measured the population of the village as 419 people in 132 households.
