= Cham-e Heydar, Isfahan =

Village in Isfahan province, Iran

Cham-e Heydar Persian: چم حيدر
- Village
- Location within Iran
- Coordinates: 32°27′32″N 50°59′52″E
- Country: Iran
- Province: Isfahan
- County: Lenjan
- District: Bagh-e Bahadoran
- Rural District: Cham Kuh

Population (2016)
  - Total: 468
- Time zone: UTC+3:30 (IRST)

Cham-e Heydar (Persian: چم حيدر) (Note: Also romanized as Cham-e Ḩeydar) is a village in Cham Kuh Rural District of Bagh-e Bahadoran District in Lenjan County, Isfahan province, Iran.

== Demographics ==
=== Population ===
At the time of the 2006 National Census, the village's population was 752 in 203 households. The following census in 2011 counted 489 people in 143 households. The 2016 census measured the population of the village as 468 people in 150 households.
