= Cham-e Aseman =

Village in Isfahan province, Iran

Cham-e Aseman Persian: چم اسمان
- Village
- Location within Iran
- Coordinates: 32°22′24″N 51°13′23″E
- Country: Iran
- Province: Isfahan
- County: Lenjan
- District: Bagh-e Bahadoran
- Rural District: Zirkuh

Population (2016)
  - Total: 110
- Time zone: UTC+3:30 (IRST)

Cham-e Aseman (Persian: چم اسمان) (Note: Also romanized as Cham Asmān and Cham-e Āsemān) is a village in Zirkuh Rural District (Note: Formerly Chermahin Rural District) of Bagh-e Bahadoran District in Lenjan County, Isfahan province, Iran.

== Demographics ==
=== Population ===
At the time of the 2006 National Census, the village's population was 110 in 30 households. The following census in 2011 counted 98 people in 30 households. The 2016 census measured the population of the village as 110 people in 33 households.
