= Cham-e Yusefali =

Village in Isfahan province, Iran

Cham-e Yusefali Persian: چم يوسفعلي
- Village
- Location within Iran
- Coordinates: 32°26′40″N 51°00′57″E
- Country: Iran
- Province: Isfahan
- County: Lenjan
- District: Bagh-e Bahadoran
- Rural District: Cham Kuh

Population (2016)
  - Total: 1,526
- Time zone: UTC+3:30 (IRST)

Cham-e Yusefali (Persian: چم يوسفعلي) (Note: Also romanized as Cham-e Yūsef‘alī and Cham-e Yūsof ‘Alī) is a village in, and the capital of, Cham Kuh Rural District in Bagh-e Bahadoran District of Lenjan County, Isfahan province, Iran.

== Demographics ==
=== Population ===
At the time of the 2006 National Census, the village's population was 1,630 in 380 households. The following census in 2011 counted 1,661 people in 458 households. The 2016 census measured the population of the village as 1,526 people in 434 households, the most populous in its rural district.
