= Murkan =

Village in Isfahan province, Iran

Murkan Persian: موركان
- Village
- Location within Iran
- Coordinates: 32°24′02″N 51°09′17″E
- Country: Iran
- Province: Isfahan
- County: Lenjan
- District: Bagh-e Bahadoran
- Rural District: Cham Rud

Population (2016)
  - Total: 1,743
- Time zone: UTC+3:30 (IRST)

Murkan (Persian: موركان) (Note: Also romanized as Mūrkān) is a village in Cham Rud Rural District of Bagh-e Bahadoran District in Lenjan County, Isfahan province, Iran.

== Demographics ==
=== Population ===
At the time of the 2006 National Census, the village's population was 1,909 in 487 households. The following census in 2011 counted 1,857 people in 572 households. The 2016 census measured the population of the village as 1,743 people in 566 households.
