= Parkestan =

Village in Isfahan province, Iran

Parkestan Persian: پركستان
- Village
- Location within Iran
- Coordinates: 32°26′17″N 51°04′35″E
- Country: Iran
- Province: Isfahan
- County: Lenjan
- District: Bagh-e Bahadoran
- Rural District: Cham Kuh

Population (2016)
  - Total: 76
- Time zone: UTC+3:30 (IRST)

Parkestan (Persian: پركستان) (Note: Also romanized as Parkestān; also known as Parkeshān) is a village in Cham Kuh Rural District of Bagh-e Bahadoran District in Lenjan County, Isfahan province, Iran.

== Demographics ==
=== Population ===
At the time of the 2006 National Census, the village's population was 131 in 33 households. The following census in 2011 counted 125 people in 41 households. The 2016 census measured the population of the village as 76 people in 27 households.
