= Kelishad-e Rokh =

Village in Isfahan province, Iran

Kelishad-e Rokh Persian: كليشادرخ
- Village
- Location within Iran
- Coordinates: 32°21′20″N 51°05′01″E
- Country: Iran
- Province: Isfahan
- County: Lenjan
- District: Bagh-e Bahadoran
- Rural District: Zirkuh

Population (2016)
  - Total: 1,688
- Time zone: UTC+3:30 (IRST)

Kelishad-e Rokh (Persian: كليشادرخ) (Note: Also romanized as Kelīshād Rokh and Kelīshād-e Rokh) is a village in Zirkuh Rural District (Note: Formerly Chermahin Rural District) of Bagh-e Bahadoran District in Lenjan County, Isfahan province, Iran.

== Demographics ==
=== Population ===
At the time of the 2006 National Census, the village's population was 1,684 in 453 households. The following census in 2011 counted 1,794 people in 532 households. The 2016 census measured the population of the village as 1,688 people in 533 households.
