= Homam, Iran =

Village in Isfahan province, Iran

Homam Persian: همام
- Village
- Location within Iran
- Coordinates: 32°23′01″N 51°09′05″E
- Country: Iran
- Province: Isfahan
- County: Lenjan
- District: Bagh-e Bahadoran
- Rural District: Cham Rud

Population (2016)
  - Total: 124
- Time zone: UTC+3:30 (IRST)

Homam (Persian: همام) (Note: Also romanized as Hemām and Homām; also known as Deh Mūm) is a village in Cham Rud Rural District of Bagh-e Bahadoran District in Lenjan County, Isfahan province, Iran.

== Demographics ==
=== Population ===
At the time of the 2006 National Census, the village's population was 152 in 42 households. The following census in 2011 counted 114 people in 38 households. The 2016 census measured the population of the village as 124 people in 45 households.

== Notable people ==
Yahya Rahim Safavi, Iranian general, born 1952
