= Cham-e Alishah =

Village in Isfahan province, Iran

Cham-e Alishah Persian: چم عليشاه
- Village
- Location within Iran
- Coordinates: 32°26′31″N 51°03′38″E
- Country: Iran
- Province: Isfahan
- County: Lenjan
- District: Bagh-e Bahadoran
- Rural District: Cham Kuh

Population (2016)
  - Total: 353
- Time zone: UTC+3:30 (IRST)

Cham-e Alishah (Persian: چم عليشاه) (Note: Also romanized as Cham-e ‘Alī Shāh and Cham-e ‘Alīshāh) is a village in Cham Kuh Rural District of Bagh-e Bahadoran District in Lenjan County, Isfahan province, Iran.

== Demographics ==
=== Population ===
At the time of the 2006 National Census, the village's population was 554 in 133 households. The following census in 2011 counted 415 people in 133 households. The 2016 census measured the population of the village as 353 people in 116 households.
