= Ashiyan, Isfahan =

Village in Isfahan province, Iran

Ashiyan Persian: اشيان
- Village
- Location within Iran
- Coordinates: 32°21′14″N 51°24′50″E
- Country: Iran
- Province: Isfahan
- County: Lenjan
- District: Central
- Rural District: Ashiyan-e Jonubi

Population (2016)
  - Total: 884
- Time zone: UTC+3:30 (IRST)

Ashiyan (Persian: اشيان) (Note: Also romanized as Oshiyan and Oshīyān) is a village in, and the capital of, Ashiyan-e Jonubi Rural District in the Central District of Lenjan County, Isfahan province, Iran. It was the capital of Ashiyan Rural District until its capital was transferred to the village of Mehrabad.

== Demographics ==
=== Population ===
At the time of the 2006 National Census, the village's population was 1,091 in 267 households, when it was in Ashiyan Rural District. (Note: Renamed Ashiyan-e Shomali Rural District) The following census in 2011 counted 1,079 people in 303 households. The 2016 census measured the population of the village as 884 people in 280 households.

In 2012, the rural district was transferred to the new Fuladshahr District and renamed Ashiyan-e Shomali Rural District. Ashiyan was transferred to Ashiyan-e Jonubi Rural District created in the Central District.
