= Qaleh-ye Torki =

Village in Isfahan province, Iran

Qaleh-ye Torki Persian: قلعه تركي
- Village
- Location within Iran
- Coordinates: 32°27′04″N 51°07′11″E
- Country: Iran
- Province: Isfahan
- County: Lenjan
- District: Bagh-e Bahadoran
- Rural District: Cham Rud

Population (2016)
  - Total: 25
- Time zone: UTC+3:30 (IRST)

Qaleh-ye Torki (Persian: قلعه تركي) (Note: Also romanized as Qal‘eh-ye Torkī) is a village in Cham Rud Rural District of Bagh-e Bahadoran District in Lenjan County, Isfahan province, Iran.

== Demographics ==
=== Population ===
At the time of the 2006 National Census, the village's population was 56 in 14 households. The following census in 2011 counted 26 people in nine households. The 2016 census measured the population of the village as 25 people in 10 households.
