= Hardang, Iran =

Village in Isfahan province, Iran

Hardang Persian: هاردنگ
- Village
- Location within Iran
- Coordinates: 32°16′28″N 51°11′29″E
- Country: Iran
- Province: Isfahan
- County: Lenjan
- District: Bagh-e Bahadoran
- Rural District: Zirkuh

Population (2016)
  - Total: 1,597
- Time zone: UTC+3:30 (IRST)

Hardang (Persian: هاردنگ) (Note: Also romanized as Hārdang; also known as Hardank and Hārdank) is a village in Zirkuh Rural District (Note: Formerly Chermahin Rural District) of Bagh-e Bahadoran District in Lenjan County, Isfahan province, Iran.

== Demographics ==
=== Population ===
At the time of the 2006 National Census, the village's population was 1,774 in 460 households. The following census in 2011 counted 1,657 people in 495 households. The 2016 census measured the population of the village as 1,597 people in 497 households.
