= Saidabad, Lenjan =

Village in Isfahan province, Iran

Saidabad Persian: سعيداباد
- Village
- Location within Iran
- Coordinates: 32°24′34″N 51°08′26″E
- Country: Iran
- Province: Isfahan
- County: Lenjan
- District: Bagh-e Bahadoran
- Rural District: Cham Rud

Population (2016)
  - Total: 299
- Time zone: UTC+3:30 (IRST)

Saidabad (Persian: سعيداباد) (Note: Also romanized as Sa‘īdābād) is a village in Cham Rud Rural District of Bagh-e Bahadoran District in Lenjan County, Isfahan province, Iran.

== Demographics ==
=== Population ===
At the time of the 2006 National Census, the village's population was 149 in 44 households. The following census in 2011 counted 130 people in 43 households. The 2016 census measured the population of the village as 299 people in 103 households.
