= Cham-e Taq =

Village in Isfahan province, Iran

Cham-e Taq Persian: چم طاق
- Village
- Location within Iran
- Coordinates: 32°27′32″N 50°59′16″E
- Country: Iran
- Province: Isfahan
- County: Lenjan
- District: Bagh-e Bahadoran
- Rural District: Cham Kuh

Population (2016)
  - Total: 1,017
- Time zone: UTC+3:30 (IRST)

Cham-e Taq (Persian: چم طاق) (Note: Also romanized as Cham-e Ţāq) is a village in Cham Kuh Rural District of Bagh-e Bahadoran District in Lenjan County, Isfahan province, Iran.

== Demographics ==
=== Population ===
At the time of the 2006 National Census, the village's population was 1,112 in 292 households. The following census in 2011 counted 1,056 people in 324 households. The 2016 census measured the population of the village as 1,017 people in 327 households.
