= Jafarabad, Lenjan =

Village in Isfahan province, Iran

Jafarabad Persian: جعفراباد
- Village
- Location within Iran
- Coordinates: 32°24′19″N 51°00′54″E
- Country: Iran
- Province: Isfahan
- County: Lenjan
- District: Bagh-e Bahadoran
- Rural District: Cham Kuh

Population (2016)
  - Total: 221
- Time zone: UTC+3:30 (IRST)

Jafarabad (Persian: جعفراباد) (Note: Also romanized as Ja‘farābād) is a village in Cham Kuh Rural District of Bagh-e Bahadoran District in Lenjan County, Isfahan province, Iran.

== Demographics ==
=== Population ===
At the time of the 2006 National Census, the village's population was 232 in 49 households. The following census in 2011 counted 310 people in 84 households. The 2016 census measured the population of the village as 221 people in 66 households.
