= Durak, Lenjan =

Village in Isfahan province, Iran

Durak Persian: دورك
- Village
- Location within Iran
- Coordinates: 32°25′19″N 51°07′18″E
- Country: Iran
- Province: Isfahan
- County: Lenjan
- District: Bagh-e Bahadoran
- Rural District: Cham Rud

Population (2016)
  - Total: 173
- Time zone: UTC+3:30 (IRST)

Durak (Persian: دورك) (Note: Also romanized as Dūrak) is a village in Cham Rud Rural District of Bagh-e Bahadoran District in Lenjan County, Isfahan province, Iran.

== Demographics ==
=== Population ===
At the time of the 2006 National Census, the village's population was 237 in 54 households. The following census in 2011 counted 139 people in 40 households. The 2016 census measured the population of the village as 173 people in 57 households.
