= Ay Dughmish =

Village in Isfahan province, Iran

Ay Dughmish Persian: ايدوغميش
- Village
- Location within Iran
- Coordinates: 32°25′55″N 51°06′15″E
- Country: Iran
- Province: Isfahan
- County: Lenjan
- District: Bagh-e Bahadoran
- Rural District: Cham Rud

Population (2016)
  - Total: 9
- Time zone: UTC+3:30 (IRST)

Ay Dughmish (Persian: ايدوغميش) (Note: Also romanized as Āy Dūghmīsh; also known as Āydoghmīsh) is a village in Cham Rud Rural District of Bagh-e Bahadoran District in Lenjan County, Isfahan province, Iran.

== Demographics ==
=== Population ===
At the time of the 2006 National Census, the village's population was 16 in eight households. The following census in 2011 counted six people in four households. The 2016 census measured the population of the village as nine people in five households.
