= Cham-e Kahriz =

Village in Isfahan province, Iran

Cham-e Kahriz Persian: چم كهريز
- Village
- Location within Iran
- Coordinates: 32°26′13″N 51°02′07″E
- Country: Iran
- Province: Isfahan
- County: Lenjan
- District: Bagh-e Bahadoran
- Rural District: Cham Kuh

Population (2016)
  - Total: 279
- Time zone: UTC+3:30 (IRST)

Cham-e Kahriz (Persian: چم كهريز) (Note: Also romanized as Cham Kahrīz and Cham-e Kahrīz) is a village in Cham Kuh Rural District of Bagh-e Bahadoran District in Lenjan County, Isfahan province, Iran.

== Demographics ==
=== Population ===
At the time of the 2006 National Census, the village's population was 309 in 81 households. The following census in 2011 counted 231 people in 72 households. The 2016 census measured the population of the village as 279 people in 84 households.
