= Lay Bid, Isfahan =

Village in Isfahan province, Iran

Lay Bid Persian: لاي بيد
- Village
- Location within Iran
- Coordinates: 32°21′18″N 51°08′25″E
- Country: Iran
- Province: Isfahan
- County: Lenjan
- District: Bagh-e Bahadoran
- Rural District: Zirkuh

Population (2016)
  - Total: 673
- Time zone: UTC+3:30 (IRST)

Lay Bid (Persian: لاي بيد) (Note: Also romanized as Lāy Bīd; formerly known as Qaleh Lay Bid (قلعه لاي بيد), also romanized as Qal‘eh Lāy Bīd; also known as Lābīd) is a village in Zirkuh Rural District (Note: Formerly Chermahin Rural District) of Bagh-e Bahadoran District in Lenjan County, Isfahan province, Iran.

== Demographics ==
=== Population ===
At the time of the 2006 National Census, the village's population, as Qaleh Lay Bid, was 810 in 189 households. The following census in 2011 counted 751 people in 202 households, by which time the village was listed as Lay Bid. The 2016 census measured the population of the village as 673 people in 204 households.
