= Hajji Alvan =

Village in Isfahan province, Iran

Hajji Alvan Persian: حاجي الوان
- Village
- Location within Iran
- Coordinates: 32°29′00″N 51°06′31″E
- Country: Iran
- Province: Isfahan
- County: Lenjan
- District: Bagh-e Bahadoran
- Rural District: Cham Rud

Population (2016)
  - Total: 169
- Time zone: UTC+3:30 (IRST)

Hajji Alvan (Persian: حاجي الوان) (Note: Also romanized as Ḩājī Alvān and Ḩājjī Alvān) is a village in Cham Rud Rural District of Bagh-e Bahadoran District in Lenjan County, Isfahan province, Iran.

== Demographics ==
=== Population ===
At the time of the 2006 National Census, the village's population was 214 in 59 households. The following census in 2011 counted 188 people in 65 households. The 2016 census measured the population of the village as 169 people in 57 households.
