= Berenjegan, Isfahan =

Village in Isfahan province, Iran

Berenjegan Persian: برنجگان
- Village
- Location within Iran
- Coordinates: 32°25′19″N 51°06′55″E
- Country: Iran
- Province: Isfahan
- County: Lenjan
- District: Bagh-e Bahadoran
- Rural District: Cham Rud

Population (2016)
  - Total: 878
- Time zone: UTC+3:30 (IRST)

Berenjegan (Persian: برنجگان) (Note: Also romanized as Berenjegān; also known as Berenjekān) is a village in Cham Rud Rural District of Bagh-e Bahadoran District in Lenjan County, Isfahan province, Iran.

== Demographics ==
=== Population ===
At the time of the 2006 National Census, the village's population was 1,016 in 240 households. The following census in 2011 counted 986 people in 288 households. The 2016 census measured the population of the village as 878 people in 270 households.
