= Kateh Shur =

Village in Isfahan province, Iran

Kateh Shur Persian: كته شور
- Village
- Location within Iran
- Coordinates: 32°25′30″N 51°07′18″E
- Country: Iran
- Province: Isfahan
- County: Lenjan
- District: Bagh-e Bahadoran
- Rural District: Cham Rud

Population (2016)
  - Total: 437
- Time zone: UTC+3:30 (IRST)

Kateh Shur (Persian: كته شور) (Note: Also romanized as Kateh Shūr) is a village in Cham Rud Rural District of Bagh-e Bahadoran District in Lenjan County, Isfahan province, Iran.

== Demographics ==
=== Population ===
At the time of the 2006 National Census, the village's population was 427 in 104 households. The following census in 2011 counted 356 people in 100 households. The 2016 census measured the population of the village as 437 people in 128 households.
