= Hajat Aqa =

Village in Isfahan province, Iran

Hajat Aqa Persian: حاجت اقا
- Village
- Location within Iran
- Coordinates: 32°20′59″N 51°07′46″E
- Country: Iran
- Province: Isfahan
- County: Lenjan
- District: Bagh-e Bahadoran
- Rural District: Zirkuh

Population (2016)
  - Total: 804
- Time zone: UTC+3:30 (IRST)

Hajat Aqa (Persian: حاجت اقا) (Note: Also romanized as Ḩājat Āqā; also known as Ḩājat Āghā) is a village in Zirkuh Rural District (Note: Formerly Chermahin Rural District) of Bagh-e Bahadoran District in Lenjan County, Isfahan province, Iran.

== Demographics ==
=== Population ===
At the time of the 2006 National Census, the village's population was 773 in 205 households. The following census in 2011 counted 750 people in 210 households. The 2016 census measured the population of the village as 804 people in 249 households.
