= Roknabad, Isfahan =

Village in Isfahan province, Iran

Roknabad Persian: ركن اباد
- Village
- Location within Iran
- Coordinates: 32°21′36″N 51°04′06″E
- Country: Iran
- Province: Isfahan
- County: Lenjan
- District: Bagh-e Bahadoran
- Rural District: Zirkuh

Population (2016)
  - Total: 697
- Time zone: UTC+3:30 (IRST)

Roknabad (Persian: رکن‌آباد) (Note: Also romanized as Roknābād; also known as Qal‘eh Now, Rokhābād, and SehMazra‘eh) is a village in Zirkuh Rural District (Note: Formerly Chermahin Rural District) of Bagh-e Bahadoran District in Lenjan County, Isfahan province, Iran.

== Demographics ==
=== Population ===
At the time of the 2006 National Census, the village's population was 599 in 177 households. The following census in 2011 counted 661 people in 202 households. The 2016 census measured the population of the village as 697 people in 220 households.
