= Sadeqabad, Bagh-e Bahadoran =

Village in Isfahan province, Iran

Sadeqabad Persian: صادق اباد
- Village
- Location within Iran
- Coordinates: 32°25′35″N 51°06′45″E
- Country: Iran
- Province: Isfahan
- County: Lenjan
- District: Bagh-e Bahadoran
- Rural District: Cham Rud

Population (2016)
  - Total: 194
- Time zone: UTC+3:30 (IRST)

Sadeqabad (Persian: صادق اباد) (Note: Also romanized as Şādeqābād) is a village in Cham Rud Rural District of Bagh-e Bahadoran District in Lenjan County, Isfahan province, Iran.

== Demographics ==
=== Population ===
At the time of the 2006 National Census, the village's population was 266 in 77 households. The following census in 2011 counted 199 people in 68 households. The 2016 census measured the population of the village as 194 people in 66 households.
