= Cham-e Nur =

Village in Isfahan province, Iran

Cham-e Nur Persian: چم نور
- Village
- Location within Iran
- Coordinates: 32°26′32″N 51°01′39″E
- Country: Iran
- Province: Isfahan
- County: Lenjan
- District: Bagh-e Bahadoran
- Rural District: Cham Kuh

Population (2016)
  - Total: 1,317
- Time zone: UTC+3:30 (IRST)

Cham-e Nur (Persian: چم نور) (Note: Also romanized as Cham-e Nūr; also known as Cham-e Kūh) is a village in Cham Kuh Rural District of Bagh-e Bahadoran District in Lenjan County, Isfahan province, Iran.

== Demographics ==
=== Population ===
At the time of the 2006 National Census, the village's population was 1,538 in 385 households. The following census in 2011 counted 1,522 people in 447 households. The 2016 census measured the population of the village as 1,317 people in 404 households.
