= List of Late Show with David Letterman episodes =

Late Show with David Letterman logo

The following is a list of notable episodes from Late Show with David Letterman since its inception on August 30, 1993. Late Show with David Letterman is an American late-night talk show hosted by David Letterman that ran on CBS between August 30, 1993, and May 20, 2015.

== 1993 ==
=== August 30 ===
The premiere of Late Show, featuring actor/comedian Bill Murray and singer Billy Joel, attracts 23 million viewers. Murray, who had been Letterman's first Late Night guest on NBC in 1982, spray-painted "Dave!" on the front of the host's desk.

== 1994 ==
=== March 31 ===
On March 31, 1994, pop star Madonna appeared on the Late Show. The "Queen of Pop", who is known for controversy, infamously swore thirteen times throughout the interview and refused to leave at the end. Letterman, who asked her questions on various topics—including her nose ring, music, and love life—was soon branded a "sick fuck", after he suggested Madonna kiss a member of the audience. Madonna went on to ask if Letterman was wearing a "rug", whether he wanted to smell a pair of underwear she brought on the show, or whether he thought the microphone was sexually big. In between this, Madonna often swore and referred to sexual themes, including her vagina, saying: "Did you know it's good to pee in the shower?" Eventually, she swore so much that the producers went to commercials and showed comedic monologues of Madonna. Letterman has since stated, in USA Today: "I'm not pleased with the way I handled it. I should have said, 'You say that word one more time and you're gone. That's it. Adios.' And I didn't." Madonna appeared days later on The Tonight Show with Jay Leno. Although she appeared briefly at the stroke of midnight on Valentine's Day, 1995, to present Letterman with a bouquet of roses, her return to the show as a guest was not until 2000, while promoting her album Music. During that interview, and other subsequent interviews on the show, Letterman joked that he still had the panties that she gave him.

During the September 1994 MTV Video Music Awards, Madonna was a presenter and was escorted onstage by Letterman, who kissed her hand and stated, "I'll be in the car. Just... watch your language," and walked off stage to applause.

=== May 13 ===
During a week of shows taped in Los Angeles, Johnny Carson made a surprise appearance on the show after leaving The Tonight Show. Carson maintained a friendship with the show for the years that followed, even secretly writing jokes for the monologue. This rare surprise appearance was Carson's final major television appearance before his death, and to many, his way of acknowledging Letterman as his successor (even if Jay Leno was doing his former show at the time). Carson never appeared on Leno's version of Tonight.

=== December 2 ===
Hello Deli owner Rupert Jee makes his first appearance, on a segment called "Fun With Rupert".

== 1995 ==
=== April 12 ===
After finding out it was Letterman's birthday, Drew Barrymore gave him a "little impromptu birthday present": she "hopped up on his desk, did a sexy little dance, turned her back to the camera and flashed her breasts".

=== May 16 ===
A week of shows, with most crew and cast, was filmed and broadcast entirely from London, United Kingdom, featuring guests Pierce Brosnan, Jennifer Saunders, Joanna Lumley, and a musical performance by Elvis Costello. A segment featuring Zsa Zsa Gabor was also taped. In addition, sitting in with the CBS Orchestra were Little Richard and Chuck Berry.

== 1996 ==
=== September 20 ===
In early September 1996, it was announced that Late Show would experiment with a commercial-free format. The September 20 broadcast of the show did not contain traditional commercials, although there were breaks (within the show) to acknowledge sponsors. Pearl Jam was the musical guest on this night.

== 1997 ==
=== June 5 ===
Farrah Fawcett visited the show for the first time promoting a Playboy pay-per-view special and appeared disoriented and incoherent.

== 1998 ==
=== February 16 ===
NASCAR driver Dale Earnhardt does the Top Ten List after winning the Daytona 500.

== 1999 ==
=== February 23 ===
Minnesota Gov. Jesse Ventura, a former professional wrestler who had assumed office on January 4, visits the show for the first time.

=== December 31 ===
Late Show broadcasts in prime time for the year 2000 New Year's Eve. Kevin James is the guest, with a performance by the Brooklyn Philharmonic and cameo appearances by Dick Clark and New York City Mayor Rudolph Giuliani. (Under normal circumstances, Letterman does not broadcast a show on New Year's Eve, opting instead for a repeat.)

== 2000 ==
=== February 21 ===
On January 14, Letterman announced on Late Show that he was undergoing an angiogram the following day, after doctors had recently been concerned about his high cholesterol and family history (his father died of a heart attack at 57). Soon it was discovered that he had blocked arteries and had to undergo a quintuple bypass. During his recovery, after a few weeks of rerun broadcasts, the show was hosted by guests for several weeks. On his first show after recovering, Regis Philbin was his first guest; Letterman brought out all the doctors and nurses on the show who had helped him during his surgery and recovery. Despite nearly breaking out in tears during the show, Letterman seemed to find humor in his situation; while referring to one of his nurses, he said: "This woman saw me naked!" He continued to joke about the event for weeks after his return.

Additionally, Letterman invited the alternative rock band Foo Fighters as musical guest. The band performed their 1997 single "Everlong", which Letterman personally requested, and Letterman introduced them as "my favorite band, playing my favorite song." During a later Foo Fighters appearance, Letterman said that Foo Fighters had been in the middle of a South American tour which they canceled to come play on his comeback episode. In 2015, the Foo Fighters would play the song again for the final episode of the show, transitioning into the final credits.

== 2001 ==
=== September 17 ===
On September 17, 2001, David Letterman was the first major American comedy performer to return to the television airwaves after the September 11 attacks. In his opening monologue, absent the usual musical opening credits and cheering audience, an uncharacteristically serious and very emotional Letterman struggled with the reality of the attacks and the role of comedy in a post-9/11 world, saying:

The reason we were attacked, the reason these people are dead, these people are missing and dead … They weren't doing anything wrong, they were living their lives, they were going to work, they were traveling, they were doing what they normally do. Uh, as I understand it—and my understanding of this is vague, at best—another smaller group of people stole some airplanes and crashed them into buildings. And we're told that they were zealots fueled by religious fervor, religious fervor. And if you live to be a thousand years old, will that make any sense to you? Will that make any goddamned sense?

Letterman went on to praise Mayor Rudy Giuliani and the NYPD/FDNY in the monologue and ended the segment by saying "If you didn't believe it before, you can absolutely believe it now. New York City is the greatest city in the world." From that point on, Alan Kalter's opening narration at the very top of the show, which up until then poked fun at the city, introduces New York as "The greatest city in the world!" However, beginning in January 2013, Kalter's opening was changed to "From New York! Broadcasting across the nation and around the world!" and in early 2015, once again began to feature bizarre openings, minus the derogatory remarks about New York. Moreover, the opening shot of the credits, which at that time was a view of Battery Park and the World Trade Center, was changed to a dynamic helicopter view of the Statue of Liberty (used ever since) and an aerial shot of the Empire State Building.

His first guest that night was then-CBS Evening News anchor Dan Rather, who broke down twice in tears. Letterman's longtime friend and colleague Regis Philbin later joined Letterman to help lighten up the somber mood.

Time magazine named Letterman's return to the air after the attacks the Best TV Moment of 2001. Entertainment Weekly put it on its end-of-the-decade, "best-of" list, saying, "He's snarky. He's snide. But when a solemn Letterman returned to the air Sept. 17, 2001 (his was the first late-night comedy show to air after the attacks), his off-the-cuff monologue showed the shell-shocked audience it was okay to laugh…and to cry."

== 2002 ==
=== October 30 ===
The musician Warren Zevon was featured as the only guest for the entire hour. The episode concerned his recent terminal peritoneal mesothelioma diagnosis, a rare form of cancer caused from exposure to small asbestos fibers. The band played Zevon's classic song "I'll Sleep When I'm Dead" as his introduction. Zevon performed several songs and spoke at length about his illness. Zevon was a frequent guest and occasional substitute bandleader on Letterman's television shows since Late Night was first broadcast in 1982. (Letterman had also performed some backing vocals on Zevon's "Hit Somebody (The Hockey Song)", with Paul Shaffer on organ.) Zevon noted, "I may have made a tactical error in not going to a physician for 20 years." It was during this broadcast that, when asked by Letterman if he knew something more about life and death now, he first offered his oft-quoted insight on dying: "Enjoy every sandwich". He also took time to thank Letterman for his years of help, calling him "the best friend my music's ever had". For his final song of the evening, and his final public performance, Zevon performed "Roland the Headless Thompson Gunner" at Letterman's request. In the green room after the show, Zevon presented Letterman with the guitar that he always used on the show, with a single request: "Here, I want you to have this. Take good care of it." Zevon died less than a year later, shortly after the release of his album The Wind.

== 2003 ==
=== November 4 ===
Letterman announces that "last night at 11:58, I became a father." The previous night, Letterman's long-time partner, Regina Lasko, gave birth to his son, Harry.

== 2004 ==
=== March 17 ===
Singer Courtney Love flashed Letterman while standing on his desk, her bare back to the audience.

=== March 29 ===
Singer Janet Jackson made her first network television interview following the Super Bowl XXXVIII halftime show controversy.

=== May 14 ===
Letterman decided to tape the episode for May 14, 2004, at 4 a.m. EST that morning with a full studio audience. The guests for the show included rat expert Robert Sullivan, humorist Amy Sedaris and the indie rock band Modest Mouse. Highlights included Late Show staff member Bob Borden oversleeping, looking for rats with Robert Sullivan on West 53rd Street, Biff spending the night with the NYPD and Amy Sedaris giving a tour of her neighborhood at 4 in the morning. There was also a special version of the show's intro showing a montage of Late Show staffers sleeping on their desks and at their workstations, Letterman riding to the Ed Sullivan Theater on a horse and a video of Hillary Clinton introducing the show.

=== June 21 ===
The rock band Phish, making their final television appearance before their farewell concert that August, performed an afternoon set atop the Ed Sullivan Theater's marquee for the taping of that evening's episode of Late Show. Although only one song was specifically taped for the show, Phish also performed five additional songs for the hundreds of fans that had gathered outside the theater. Phish would reunite in 2009, but they did not perform on Late Show again until 2014.

== 2005 ==
=== January 31 ===
Letterman's first show after long-time friend and mentor Johnny Carson had died. The show had been on a one-week hiatus since his death. As a tribute, Letterman's opening monologue included jokes written by Carson (news reports in the weeks leading to Carson's death revealed that he had been regularly writing and sending Letterman some jokes) as well as clips shown from The Tonight Show Starring Johnny Carson. Other tributes to Carson in this episode included the band playing "Johnny's Theme" at the conclusion of Letterman's monologue, and use of title cards with the phrase, "More to Come" around commercial breaks (a standard feature of The Tonight Show during most of Carson's years there that has continued under Jay Leno's and Conan O'Brien's tenure). While describing how he felt about the news, Letterman stated:

There are so many things you miss about Johnny Carson... I was nearly this sad when the guy retired... Johnny Carson was like a public utility. At the end of the day, that's who you wanted to be there. The way that you know that Johnny was such a tremendous part of your life was when there was a guest host. You would be waiting all day to see Johnny and you'd tune in and there would be a guest host. And it would make you angry. And you'd be steaming mad, [though] not at Johnny, you would always take out your anger on the guest host.

The guests for the episode were Peter Lassally, the executive producer of The Tonight Show during Carson's tenure, and former Tonight Show band leader Doc Severinsen.

=== December 1 ===
In what Dave jokingly referred to as the "Super Bowl of Love," Oprah Winfrey made her first appearance on Late Show—and her first on any Letterman show in over 16 years. At the end of her appearance, Letterman escorted her on-air across 53rd Street to the opening of The Color Purple, the new Broadway show she was there to promote.

The episode, the fourth-most-watched in Late Show history, was followed 14 months later by a Super Bowl XLI Late Show promotion that featured her with Letterman, each wearing the jersey of the Super Bowl team from the city with which they are associated. In 2010, a Super Bowl commercial featuring Letterman, Oprah, and Jay Leno aired. As before, the trio sat on a sofa, watching the game.

== 2008 ==
=== January 2 ===
During the 2007–08 Writers Guild of America strike, the show went into reruns for two months. In late December 2007, Letterman's company, Worldwide Pants Incorporated, reached a contract agreement with the striking writers. This put Letterman and The Late Late Show with Craig Ferguson back on the air with their full staff of writers. The show opened with Hillary Clinton making a cameo appearance saying, "It has been two long months but Dave's back. Oh, well, all good things must come to an end."

Letterman returned sporting a full beard; Robin Williams was the first guest for the show's return— Letterman displayed a photograph of Williams on the picket line with Eric Stangel and Justin Stangel, two of the show's writers.

=== September 24 ===
During the 2008 presidential election, Republican candidate John McCain was scheduled to appear as the first guest on Letterman's show, the first appearance since McCain informally announced his candidacy on the show months earlier. According to Letterman, McCain called him personally to inform Letterman that he would not be appearing on the show that day, but was on his way back to Washington, DC to help draft a proposed bailout of the financial system to soften effects of the 2008 financial crisis. MSNBC show host Keith Olbermann (a longtime critic of McCain) became the replacement guest for the night.

Throughout the show, and especially during the monologue, Letterman made various jokes about the situation. During Olbermann's interview, Letterman cut to a live internal feed of that night's CBS Evening News with Katie Couric, when Couric was taping an interview with McCain during the same time of Letterman's show. When it became apparent to Letterman that McCain was not on his way back to Washington as he said he was, Letterman became visibly irritated. Although he knew McCain could not hear him, Letterman publicly said to McCain, "Hey John, I got a question, do you need a ride to the airport?" McCain spokeswoman Nicolle Wallace later stated McCain canceled his appearance on Letterman because it "wasn't a night for comedy".

The episode also seemed to have an effect on internal CBS operations: both the Late Show and the CBS Evening News are aired on the network. According to the New York Post, unidentified CBS News executives were reportedly "aggravated" about the use of the feed. Also according to the report, CBS had no knowledge of the use of the feed until the finished Late Show episode was being fed internally for distribution.

=== October 16 ===
After canceling his September 24 appearance at the last minute, John McCain appeared on October 16. The episode attracted over 6.5 million viewers, three million more than his recent typical number of viewers and the best he has scored since Oprah Winfrey was a guest on Dec. 1, 2005.

== 2009 ==
=== January 30 ===
Late Show aired the October 1, 1993, stand-up performance from comedian Bill Hicks, which Letterman chose to cut from the original broadcast as too controversial. Hicks' routine covered homosexuality, abortion, as well as his wish to murder then-popular musicians Billy Ray Cyrus, Michael Bolton, Vanilla Ice, MC Hammer and Marky Mark. To help introduce the segment, Letterman invited Bill Hicks' mother, Mary, to be a guest on the show. Letterman apologized to Mrs. Hicks for having put her son and their family through the ordeal, especially as it was so soon before Hicks' untimely death from pancreatic cancer. Letterman declared he didn't know what he had been thinking when he pulled the routine from the original show and said, "It says more about me as a guy than it says about Bill because there was absolutely nothing wrong with it."

=== February 11 ===
Late Show features an unusual interview with Joaquin Phoenix, there to promote Two Lovers. Phoenix was "sporting his Grizzly Adams beard, a black suit and dark Miami Beach grandma sunglasses" and "nervously chewed gum during the entire sitdown, often looking down as if asleep. He answered Letterman's queries with one or two befuddled words and acted surprised when the audience and host laughed at his apparent cluelessness." Daniel Kreps of Rolling Stone described Phoenix's appearance as "either Phoenix completely locked into his hoax character (the Bearded Rapper) or the most paranoid, drugged-out interview ever"; Kreps favored the hoax theory, noting that Phoenix repeatedly broke out of character, appeared to end the interview acknowledging Letterman for playing along, and noting that Casey Affleck, director of a documentary about "Phoenix's hip-hop dream, was reportedly at the CBS studios yesterday, no doubt filming this landmark interview." Letterman humorously closed the interview with the line, "Joaquin, I'm sorry you couldn't be here tonight."

Entertainment Weekly pointed out that the interview was similar to one he did in October 2000 when he was there to promote his film The Yards. Back in 2000, executive producer Maria Pope commented on Phoenix's behavior: "The first couple of times we thought there was a gas leak in the greenroom. Now we've determined, no, that's just Joaquin." On the February 19, 2009 episode of The Late Show, Letterman told guest Barbara Walters that he believed Phoenix's performance was "a goof" but he "sure can take a punch". The incident was also compared to Crispin Glover's 1987 appearance on Letterman's NBC show.

Someone claiming to have attended the taping posted on IMDb's message board, saying the appearance was performance art and Joaquin was not in his rapper persona during off-air breaks. According to the post, during breaks Letterman and his staff worked to quickly come up with new material before going on-air. After taping the interview, Joaquin thanked the audience and waved.

Affleck's mockumentary on Phoenix, I'm Still Here, was released in 2010. Phoenix returned to Late Show in September 2010, and he apologized to Letterman for his behaviour during his previous appearance.

In July 2025, Phoenix talked about the interview while he was on The Late Show with Stephen Colbert. He called it "horrible" and said, "It was strange because in some ways, it was a success, and it was also just one of the worst nights of my life." He also said, "I regret it. I'll never do it again."

=== March 2–6 ===
Irish rock group U2 appeared as the musical guest on all five episodes for the week. This was the first time in the show's history that a single act has ever appeared on five consecutive nights. The band's appearance on the show, billed as "U2 Week," was in support of their latest album, No Line on the Horizon, which was released on Tuesday, March 3. The band started the week by performing "Breathe," which was followed by "Magnificent" on the second night, "I'll Go Crazy If I Don't Go Crazy Tonight" on the third night, "Beautiful Day" on the fourth night, and "Get On Your Boots" for the final night. The band also contributed Top Ten lists and sat down for an interview during the week.

=== June 9–10, 16 ===
Letterman received criticism for jokes on the June 9 show about Alaska governor Sarah Palin and one of her daughters, in which Letterman joked, "One awkward moment for Sarah Palin at the Yankee game, during the seventh inning, her daughter was knocked up by Alex Rodriguez." Following controversy, Letterman addressed the situation on June 10 and 16, accepting full responsibility and apologizing directly to the Palin family. Palin issued a statement in which she accepted Letterman's apology while calling on such comedy to "evolve". Palin's spokeswoman later credited this incident as one of the reasons behind Palin's resignation as Alaska's Governor. Letterman's ratings were boosted in the weeks following the episode.

=== July 15 ===
Paul McCartney returned to the Ed Sullivan Theater 45 years after The Beatles made their U.S. television debut there on The Ed Sullivan Show. McCartney was interviewed by Letterman, then moved outside to do a concert from the theater's marquee for a crowd of about 4,000 people. The episode attracted 4.4 million viewers, about six percent of the 73.3 million that McCartney and the rest of the Beatles attracted in 1964 but 75% more than the 2.5 million watching The Tonight Show with Conan O'Brien that same evening. Earlier that day, The Late Show received five Emmy nominations.

=== September 21 ===
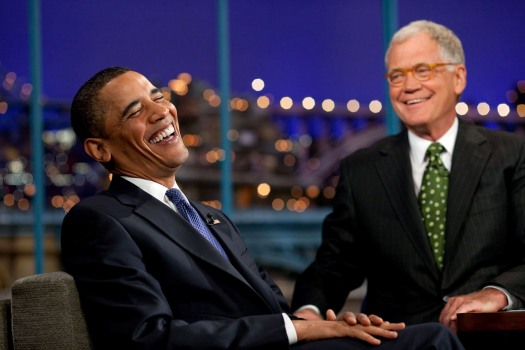
Letterman with President Obama.

President Barack Obama appeared on the Late Show, marking the first time that a sitting President of the United States appeared on the show, and only the second time a sitting president appeared on a late night talk show. In coming to the show, Obama had primarily proposed to defend and effectively communicate the widely disputed health care reform proposal in a light-hearted setting. He also discussed other topics of interest such as the Iraq War and objectives in Afghanistan. Obama had visited The Tonight Show with Jay Leno on March 19, 2009.

This show also helped lead the Late Show with David Letterman to record ratings and big wins over rivals The Tonight Show with Conan O'Brien and Nightline.

=== September 24 ===
After Letterman finished his monologue, he announced that this was his 5,000th episode on late night television. Letterman expressed how he couldn't be happier with his work and life.

=== October 1 ===
After his opening monologue, Letterman revealed to the audience that he was the victim of an extortion attempt and had to give grand jury testimony for a sting operation. The blackmailer had threatened to write a book and screenplay detailing sexual affairs the talk show host had with female members of his staff and college student interns, who worked on The Late Show for college credit and to obtain high-profile work experience in the broadcasting industry. Letterman gave few details, except to say that he cooperated with police, wrote a "fake check" for $2 million, and that the blackmailer was apprehended. According to The New York Times, this segment was not transmitted via closed circuit inside the CBS headquarters, where employees usually are able to watch the Letterman show live. The revelation of the extortion plot was national news ahead of the show airing, leading to a 22% surge in ratings.

== 2010 ==
=== August 31 ===
Actor Michael Douglas, appearing on the Late Show to promote Wall Street: Money Never Sleeps, was interviewed by Letterman in what was the actor's first interview since Douglas went public with the fact that he has throat cancer. Douglas said he had already started treatment and doctors had given him 80% chance of a full recovery.

== 2011 ==
=== August 22 ===
A few days after a posting on the Shumukh al-Islam web forum that called for his assassination, Letterman opened his monologue with a joke referencing the threat:

"Tonight, you people are ... more than an audience. You're more like a human shield."

That evening, his Top Ten list, "Top 10 thoughts that went through my mind after hearing about the threat," included "Someone wants to silence me? Get in line," "This seems like Leno's handiwork" and "Oh my God! They canceled the George Lopez Show." In spite of the jokes, it had been made public a few days earlier that the threat had resulted in the tightening of security at the Ed Sullivan Theater.

=== December 19 ===
Letterman announced the death of long-time makeup artist Michele O'Callaghan, whom he had worked with since 1991. The episode featured a speech by Dave followed by a montage of O'Callaghan's onscreen appearances.

== 2012 ==
=== February 1 ===
Letterman celebrated his 30th anniversary on late night television with guest Howard Stern. The Top Ten List, Things Staffers Would Like to say to Dave on his 30th Anniversary in Late Night, was presented by staff members who had been with Letterman since his time at NBC.

=== May 17 ===
After 13 years, late-night talk show host Conan O'Brien appeared on the Late Show.

=== October 29 & 30 ===
With Hurricane Sandy approaching New York City, the audience for that evening's taping was sent home and Letterman hosted the show in an empty Ed Sullivan Theater with actor Denzel Washington as his guest. Letterman continued without an audience the following day, October 30, as the effects of the hurricane continued to impact the city. His guests included meteorologist Jim Cantore and documentary film-maker Ken Burns, along with musical guest Andrew Bird.

== 2014 ==
=== April 3 ===
Letterman announces his retirement, after 22 years of hosting. Then, on April 10, a week after Letterman announces his retirement, CBS president Leslie Moonves announces that The Colbert Report host Stephen Colbert was announced as Letterman's replacement.

=== April 22 ===
Stephen Colbert makes his first appearance on the Late Show since being unveiled as Letterman's successor.

=== August 18 ===
In his first new show since the death of Robin Williams, Letterman paid tribute to the comedian, whom he had known dating back to their days at The Comedy Store in Los Angeles. "I had no idea that the man was in pain, that the man was suffering," Letterman said of Williams, who committed suicide. A montage of clips aired featuring Williams' multiple appearances on The Late Show, as well as an episode of Mork & Mindy in which Letterman was a guest star. The tribute was the week's most watched late night talk show video, receiving over 3.3 million views online.

== 2015 ==
=== May 20 ===
In a show that ran 17 minutes past the regular 60-minute length, Letterman hosted his 6,028th and final show as a late night host. Played more for laughs than for tears (Letterman remained dry-eyed throughout), the show featured the following:

- A cold open that began with Gerald Ford's famous quote at his 1974 presidential inauguration, "Our long national nightmare is over." In pre-taped appearances, surviving Presidents George H. W. Bush, Bill Clinton, George W. Bush repeated the line, as did current President Barack Obama, who added "Letterman is retiring!" Letterman sidled up to Obama afterwards and quipped, "You're just kidding, right?"
- Letterman's monologue was generally self-deprecating in nature, with quips about his career ("I'll be honest with you, it's beginning to look like I'm not going to get The Tonight Show!") and taped segments featuring The Simpsons and Wheel of Fortune, whose puzzle was "Good riddance to David Letterman." (then-Wheel of Fortune host Pat Sajak is the former host of The Pat Sajak Show, CBS's attempt at launching a late night talk show prior to Letterman's arrival.)
- In a brief aside at his desk, Letterman gave good wishes to his successor, Stephen Colbert, whose version of The Late Show was set to premiere on September 8, 2015. "I'm very excited," Letterman said of Colbert, adding "I think he's going to do a wonderful job, and I wish Stephen and his staff and crew nothing but the greatest success, so look forward to that."
- In lieu of scheduled guests, retrospective packages were featured, including a collage of segments with child guests and a replay of a June 1996 visit that featured Letterman manning a Taco Bell drive-thru. Classic bits were also included in interstitials coming out of commercial breaks, mainly culled from Letterman's short-lived NBC daytime show that ran in 1980, as well as a July 1982 Late Night segment featuring Calvert DeForest, dressed as Santa Claus, reading Christmas stories to children.
- The last Late Show Top Ten List consisted of "Things I've Always Wanted to Say to Dave." Rather than being delivered by Letterman, ten frequent Late Night and Late Show guests from over the years did the honors, featuring in order, Alec Baldwin, Barbara Walters, Steve Martin, Jerry Seinfeld, Jim Carrey, Chris Rock, Julia Louis-Dreyfus, Peyton Manning, Tina Fey, and Bill Murray (the penultimate show's guest), who read entry #1 ("Dave, I'll never have the money I owe you").
- Just as with Johnny Carson's final Tonight Show 23 years earlier, a "day in the life" behind-the-scenes vignette was included, featuring Letterman and his staff putting together a show.
- In his closing remarks, Letterman gave thanks to former CBS chairman Howard Stringer and current president Leslie Moonves; Paul Shaffer and the CBS Orchestra, each member of which Letterman identified by name; the writers, producers, researchers, and crew of Late Show ("It's so obvious every night and again tonight that they were so much better at their jobs than I am at my job"); his wife, Regina, and son, Harry, who were seated in the audience ("I love you both, and really, nothing else matters, does it?"); and the audience who watched him over the years. As he threw it to Foo Fighters, Letterman closed by saying, "That's pretty much all I've got; the only thing I have left to do... for the last time on a television program, thank you and good night."
- Clad in tuxedos, Foo Fighters performed a reprisal of their 1997 song "Everlong," Letterman's favourite song, who cited it as having helped him through his recovery from heart surgery in 2000; when he returned to Late Show after his recuperation, Foo Fighters cancelled a South American tour and came back to New York to perform the song on the program. As the band performed the song in the finale, a quick-cut montage of moments from both Late Show and Late Night appeared on screen.
- After Foo Fighters finished, the CBS Orchestra was heard performing Late Show's theme one last time, accompanied by a credits list of the show's staff and their images and ending with a home movie shot of Letterman's son, Harry, skiing.
