= Ashiana =

Ashi[y]ana (lit. 'nest' or 'abode' in Hindi-Urdu) may refer to:

- Ashiana (1952 film), an Indian Hindi-language romantic film by B. Trilochan, starring Raj Kapoor and Nargis
- Ashiana (1964 film), a Pakistani film
- Aashiana, a 1974 Indian Hindi-language drama film starring Ramesh Deo
- Ashiyana (TV series), a 1997 Pakistani drama series
- "Aashiyan", a song by Pritam, Nikhil Paul George and Shreya Ghoshal from the 2012 Indian film Barfi!
- Ashiyana, Lucknow, a neighbourhood in Lucknow, India

== See also ==
- Ashiyan (disambiguation)
