= Dimaj Institute =

Terrorist training center

Joint Task Force Guantanamo counter-terrorism analysts assert that the Dimaj Institute "...is a known terrorist training center".

The Summary of Evidence memo prepared for Al Khadr Abdallah Muhammed Al Yafi's Combatant Status Review Tribunal, on 14 October 2004, and the Summary of Evidence memo prepared for his first annual Administrative Review Board, on 22 September 2005, stated:

- Detainee studied for six months at the Dimaj Institute.
- The Dimaj Institute is a known terrorist training center.

The Summary of Evidence memo prepared for Al Khadr Abdallah Muhammed Al Yafi's second annual review, on 19 May 2006, stated:

- The detainee studied for six months at the al Dimaj Institute in Sadah, Yemen under al-Wadi'i.
- The al Dimaj Institute (Training Center) was used for indoctrination and recruiting grounds for foreign extremists/terrorists seeking entry into other paramilitary or jihad organizations.
