= Karchekan, Lenjan =

Village in Isfahan province, Iran

Karchekan Persian: كرچكان
- Village
- Location within Iran
- Coordinates: 32°24′37″N 51°08′08″E
- Country: Iran
- Province: Isfahan
- County: Lenjan
- District: Bagh-e Bahadoran
- Rural District: Cham Rud

Population (2016)
  - Total: 2,313
- Time zone: UTC+3:30 (IRST)

Karchekan (Persian: كرچكان) (Note: Also romanized as Karchakān and Karchekān; also known as Garchegān and Karchegān) is a village in, and the capital of, Cham Rud Rural District in Bagh-e Bahadoran District of Lenjan County, Isfahan province, Iran.

== Demographics ==
=== Population ===
At the time of the 2006 National Census, the village's population was 2,454 in 665 households. The following census in 2011 counted 2,819 people in 852 households. The 2016 census measured the population of the village as 2,313 people in 732 households, the most populous in its rural district.
