= Kachuiyeh =

Village in Isfahan province, Iran

Kachuiyeh Persian: كچوييه
- Village
- Location within Iran
- Coordinates: 32°18′08″N 51°13′10″E
- Country: Iran
- Province: Isfahan
- County: Lenjan
- District: Bagh-e Bahadoran
- Rural District: Zirkuh

Population (2016)
  - Total: 2,493
- Time zone: UTC+3:30 (IRST)

Kachuiyeh (Persian: كچوييه) (Note: Also romanized as Kachū’īyeh and Kachūyeh) is a village in, and the capital of, Zirkuh Rural District (Note: Formerly Chermahin Rural District) in Bagh-e Bahadoran District of Lenjan County, Isfahan province, Iran. The previous capital of the rural district was the village of Chermahin, now a city.

== Demographics ==
=== Population ===
At the time of the 2006 National Census, the village's population was 2,550 in 685 households. The following census in 2011 counted 2,750 people in 844 households. The 2016 census measured the population of the village as 2,493 people in 810 households, the most populous in its rural district.
