= Siege of Dammaj =

Battle of the Yemeni Revolution

- Part of Houthi insurgency and Yemeni Revolution
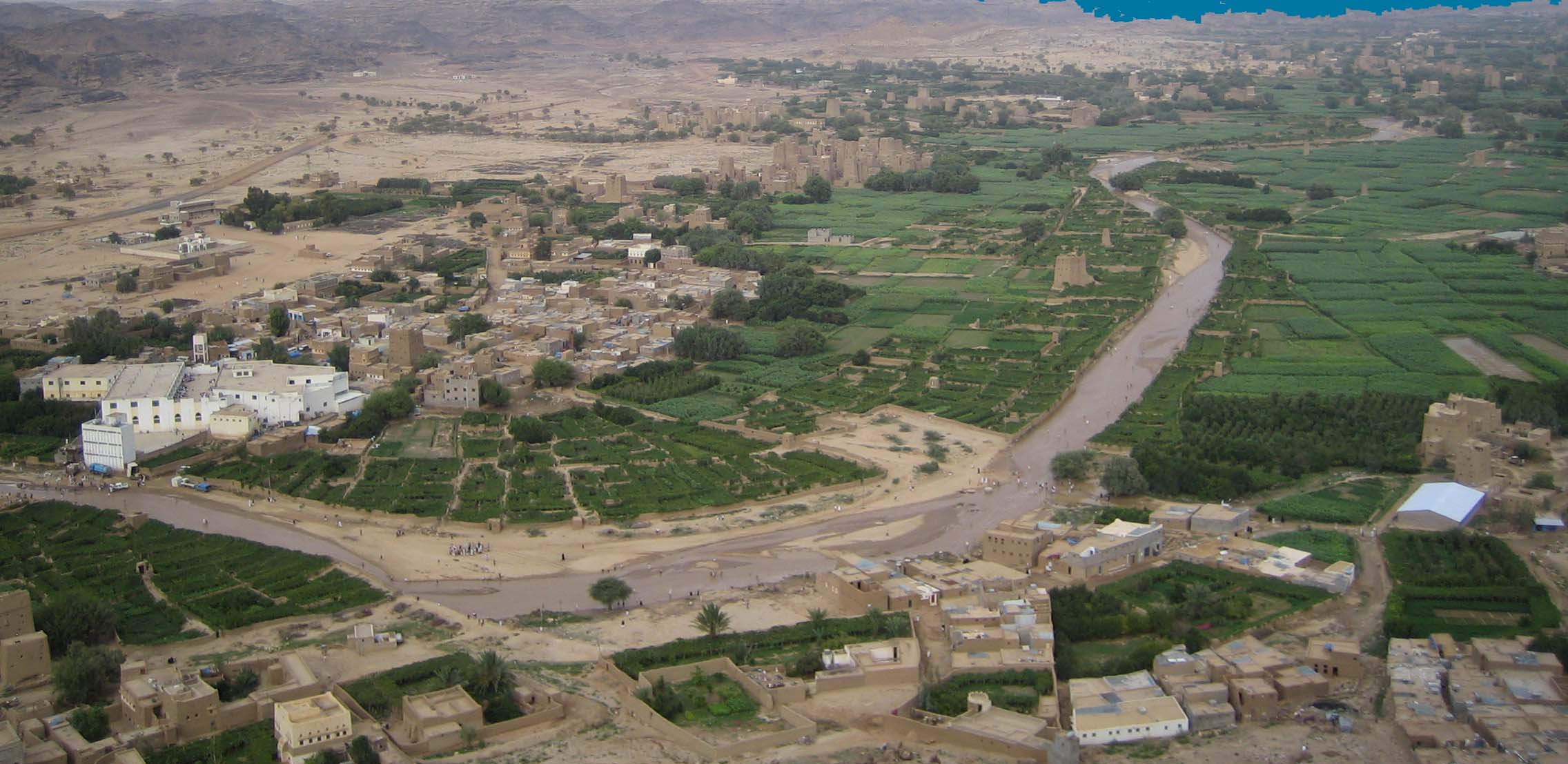
- Dar al-Hadith (big white building) in Dammaj
Date	15 October 2011 – 12 January 2014 (2 years, 2 months and 4 weeks)
Location	Dammaj, Saada Governorate, Yemen
Result	Houthi victory: Ceasefire implemented; Salafis are driven out of Dammaj; Destruction of Dar al-Hadith

Belligerents
Salafi fighters; Pro-government tribes	Houthis

Commanders and leaders
Yahya al-Hajuri	Abdullah Yahya al-Hakim; Saleh Habra; Dhaifallah al-Shami

Strength
7,000 people	Unknown

Casualties and losses
+250 killed and 500 wounded	+130 killed
- +200 people killed & +600 injured in total

The siege of Dammaj began in October 2011 when the Houthis, a rebel group which controls the Saada Governorate, accused Salafis loyal to the Yemeni government of smuggling weapons into their religious center in the town of Dammaj and demanded they hand over their weapons and military posts in the town. As the Salafis refused, Houthi rebels responded by imposing a siege on Dammaj, closing the main entrances leading to the town. The town was controlled by the Houthis and the fighting was mainly centered at Dar al-Hadith religious school, which was operated by Salafis.

In December 2011, a tribal ceasefire was first signed in which both sides temporarily agreed to the removal of all their military checkpoints and barriers around Dammaj. Neutral armed men from the Hashid and Bakil tribes were deployed around the town to ensure both sides adhere to the ceasefire. However, fighting erupted again in October 2013 when Houthis shelled a Salafi mosque and the adjacent Quranic religious school Dar al-Hadith, anticipating an attack from Salafi fighters who had gathered in Dammaj. Houthi rebels later advanced and captured many positions evacuated by the outgunned Salafi fighters and subsequently demolished the symbolic Dar al-Hadith religious school after months of fighting.

The second ceasefire was brokered by the Yemeni government under President Abdrabbuh Mansur Hadi in January 2014. Yemeni troops were deployed to Dammaj and evacuated all Salafi fighters and their families, as well as foreign students to the neighboring governorates, thereby handing over victory to the Houthis.

Media and analysts described the fighting in Dammaj as a sectarian conflict that may have worsened Sunni-Shia relations in Yemen. Other observers believe that the Dammaj siege was representative of a regional contest between Saudi Arabia, who traditionally supported the Salafis, and Iran who backed the Houthi movement.

== Background ==
=== Salafi establishment in Yemen ===
The roots of the sectarian conflict in Yemen can be arguably connected to the proselytization of Salafism inside Yemen. This proselytizing has somewhat caused resistance from Zaydi Shia demographics who perceive it as a threat to their existence.

Imam Muqbil bin Hadi al-Wadi'i, a Yemeni student of the Islamic University of Medina in Saudi Arabia, founded the Dar al-Hadith institution at Dammaj in 1979, located in the heart of Saada governorate which would later be the stronghold of the Houthi movement. Dammaj would later be turned into a site for thousands of students from across the world who sought to study Salafism in its purest form.

As the religious school led to the conversion of many Zaydi adherents to Salafism, and with Saudi and Yemeni government support arguably led to a Zaydi revivalist movement at 1980s in response to rising Salafi hegemony which challenges the traditional Zaydi heartlands in northern regions of Yemen.

Muqbil bin Hadi al-Wadi'i rejected Osama bin Laden in the 1990s. The Salafis from Dammaj and its Dar al-Hadith imam, Sheikh Yahya al-Hajuri, claimed that they were completely against al-Qaeda and all that it stands for.

=== Houthi rise in Saada ===
During the Houthi insurgency between 2004 and 2010, the Yemeni government, led by President Ali Abdullah Saleh, recruited over 5,000 Salafi fighters to fight alongside them. At least 69 students from Dar al-Hadith were killed during Operation Scorched Earth while fighting on the government's side.

When mass protests against Ali Abdullah Saleh began in January 2011, the Houthis joined the uprising. The group of Salafis in Dar al-Hadith however denounced the protests, siding with the government instead. In response to the "Karama Massacre" incident at the capital Sanaa, which prompted a flood of army and government defections nationwide, the Houthis took the opportunity to seize control of Saada in March 2011. They appointed former Saleh loyalist and arms dealer Fares Manaa as their governor of Saada, with the job of managing military and security affairs for the governorate.

By July 2011, the Houthis had slowly expanded their insurgency towards neighbouring Al Jawf Governorate, clashing with tribal fighters loyal to the Sunni Islamist Al-Islah party, in which over 120 people were killed. The fighting erupted after pro-Islah tribes first seized control of the governorate after its governor, loyal to Saleh, fled, and the Houthis refused to hand over a Yemeni military base which they had seized several months earlier. Fighting continued until 11 July with more than 30 people killed. The Houthis claimed that some elements of the pro-Islah militias had links to al-Qaeda.

In August, a car bomb killed 14 Houthi rebels in Al Jawf during a meeting in a government administration complex at Al Matammah. Although the Houthis initially blamed the United States and Israel for the bombing, Al-Qaeda in the Arabian Peninsula (AQAP) eventually claimed responsibility, with the organization having declared a holy war against the Houthis earlier that year.

== Siege ==
On 15 October 2011, the Houthis received a leaked letter from Dar al-Hadith's imam, Sheikh Yahya al-Hajuri, who urged the Central Security Organization commander Yahya Mohamed Abdullah Saleh to fight against the Houthis. At the same time, a 13-year-old Houthi supporter was also physically assaulted in Dammaj by Salafi students. This prompted the Houthis to demand that the Salafis empty their military posts in the city, claiming that the Dammaj school had made attacks against Houthi supporters and was attempting to take control of military positions outside of their area by continuing to incite them, and by describing the Houthis as non-believers and carrying out military training for their supporters, but the Salafis refused. The Houthis responded by besieging Dar al-Hadith on 18 October, surrounding it with snipers and attacking the Salafi-held Al Baraqa mountain on 30 October. The Salafis claimed the siege did not allow any food or medicine to enter the complex and called upon Yemen authorities to break the siege. The Houthis claimed they were only blocking weapons from entering the area.

=== First battle ===
In response to the siege, tribesmen loyal to the Salafi group blocked the Al Buqa road connecting Saada to Saudi Arabia and tribesmen from the al-Islah movement blocked the Sanaa-Saada road. Houthi-appointed governor of Saada, Fares Manaa, tried to mediate a ceasefire in which the Houthis would re-open the road and both sides would withdraw to their old positions. However, the ceasefire lasted merely four hours, after which a new round of fighting broke out in which one Salafi fighter was killed. The school and surrounding areas, including 10,000 inhabitants, were besieged for over two weeks.

Another ceasefire, crafted by local tribesmen, lasted one week and was broken on 25 November, when Houthis began shelling the Salafi fighters' positions in the town, killing three and wounding two. A Houthi leader, Saleh Habra, claimed the Yemeni government was supplying arms to the Salafis and was trying to help them set up a base near the Saudi border, stating the new attack was to cut off their arms supplies. Salafi leader Sheikh Yahya al-Hajuri responded by declaring jihad against the Houthis, which he described as "rejectionists".

The Houthis subsequently launched a raid into the town in the pre-dawn hours on 26 November, which lasted until the afternoon of 27 November. According to another Houthi leader, Dhaifullah al-Shami, the raid was in response to the Salafis rejecting a ceasefire offer by the Houthi leader Abdul Malik al-Houthi and continued fighting. A total of 24 Salafis were killed and 61 injured during the raid. The deaths included two Indonesian and two American nationals. The two Indonesians were later confirmed as Zamiri and Abu Soleh, both 24 years old. Al-Shami confirmed that several Houthis were also killed during the raid, which the Houthi spokesman Mohamed Abdelsalam put the number at less than ten. On 30 November, the Houthis shelled the town again, injuring 26 people.

On 3 December, the Houthis agreed to ease the blockade by allowing food aid supplied by the Red Cross to enter the area. However, they did not allow anyone to go in and out. Salafi students also accused the Houthis of confiscating a third of the food for themselves, a claim denied by the Houthis. According to the Red Cross, between 3 December and the start of the siege, four children had died of hunger and three elderly men died of lack of medications. The town was still said to be short on fuel. The Houthis claimed a ceasefire had been put in place, however fighting reportedly continued on both sides.

On 7 December, 3 Houthis were killed after Salafis launched a new attack. Houthi leader Abdul Malik al-Houthi responded in a statement saying that "In a step that reveals their malicious intentions, they opened fire on us, killing three people, these unprovoked attacks are unjustified and are aimed at igniting a sectarian war in the country." The Houthis responded by shelling Salafi positions on the Al Baraqa mountain, killing six people and injuring 15. A Salafi spokesman claimed that "al-Houthis have taken advantage of the ceasefire and made advances on Al Baraqa mountain" and said that he expected casualties to rise as violence would continue. On 7 December, new clashes broke out in which three Houthis and four Salafis were killed. According to eyewitnesses, the Houthis generally had the upper hand during the fighting, although Salafis managed to capture several Houthi positions. The Houthis barricaded their positions on Al Baraqa.

Clashes broke out on 8 December at the main highway in Kitaf where the Houthis had been blockading for weeks. According to government officials, the Houthis attacked a convoy sent by the Sunni Wa'ela tribe to bring food and medicine to Dammaj. The Houthis, however, claimed that the aid caravan en route to Dammaj was a military caravan and attacked Houthi followers in the Kitaf area. The Houthis called the convoy a provocation through which foreign forces were trying to ignite sectarian violence in the region. Eight Houthis and six tribesmen were killed and 15 people were injured in the fighting.

On 19 December, Houthis shelled Dammaj again, killing five Sunnis, including a child. The next day, fighters from the Sunni Wa'ela tribe attacked the western side of Dammaj in an attempt to bring aid into the town. Five Wa'ela tribal fighters and four Houthis were killed during the clashes.

=== Ceasefire & skirmish clashes ===
On 22 December, a new tribal ceasefire was signed in which both sides agreed to the removal of all their military checkpoints and barriers around the town. Neutral armed men from the Hashid and Bakil tribes were deployed around the town to ensure both sides adhered to the ceasefire.

However, the truce did not last long. Clashes between the Houthis and Salafi fighters erupted again on 12 January 2012 on Saada's outskirts and Mustaba in Hajjah Governorate.

In June 2012, renewed clashes between the Houthis and Salafi students left 22 dead from the latter, including 2 British nationals.

=== Renewed fighting ===
On 29 October 2013, fighting began again when Houthi forces shelled a mosque and the adjacent Salafi religious school Dar al-Hadith, prompting an attack from 4,000 Salafi fighters who had gathered in Dammaj. 58 were killed and a hundred wounded in the Salafi side, with no reports of casualties on the Houthi side. On 21 December, the Houthi-Salafi conflict spilled over to Amran Governorate, leaving several fighters from both sides dead and wounded from clashes. This came amidst pro-Islah and Salafi armed tribesmen attempting to open different fronts in Amran and Al Jawf Governorates, as well as tribesmen in Arhab, north of Sanaa, blocking the roads leading to Saada, preventing the entrance of goods and services toward Houthi groups in Saada.

Houthi rebels and Salafi fighters clashed at many northern governorates on early January 2014. By this time, the conflict had been reported in Saada, Amran, Al Jawf, and Hajjah. However, the Houthis soon managed to advance towards Salafi positions in Kitaf and Al Buqa, as the Salafis were increasingly outgunned due to the ongoing Houthi siege. Consequently, the rebels blow up the Dar al-Hadith religious school and 20 houses, symbolically destroying Salafi hegemony in Dammaj.

=== Government mediation ===
The Yemeni government had not officially participated in the battles between Houthi rebels and Salafi fighters since 2011. Instead, since December 2013, it was working to send government representatives in attempts to mediate for a prolonged ceasefire in Dammaj.

In early January 2014, a presidential delegation led by Abdrabbuh Mansur Hadi and a committee headed by Sanaa mayor Abdulqader Hilal arrived at Saada to work out a peace deal between fighters from both sides. By 12 January, a ceasefire agreement was finally signed between Houthi rebels and Sunni tribesmen, ending the conflict in Dammaj and most of the northern governorates.

As part of the ceasefire, Yemeni troops deployed to Dammaj and evacuated all Salafi fighters and their families to the neighboring Al Hudaydah Governorate and Sanaa Governorate, thus handing over victory to the Houthis. Many Salafis, however, said they felt cheated by the agreement.

== Aftermath ==
By January 2014, the conflict in Dammaj had left over 200 people killed and 600 injured, most of them from the Salafi side. The Houthis did not release their own reports of casualties.

== Reactions ==
Following the siege, the government of Indonesia tried to evacuate its citizens from the Dar al-Hadith institute where over 100 Indonesians were said to live. Yemen's Indonesian ambassador, Agus Budiman, said it was difficult for them to evacuate the students because most of them did not want to leave and were armed and "ready for jihad", adding that the government was "worried about their condition". They were eventually contacted with permission of Sheikh al-Hajoori and the Houthis said they would ensure the safety of their evacuation, although they did not allow embassy staff to enter the compound or take the bodies.

Yemeni Salafi Islamists held a rally Sanaa on 30 November 2011, led by Mohammad al-Ammari, to protest the siege. Ammari said that thousands of people were being besieged and deprived of food and medicine, accusing the Houthis of trying to create a Shi'a state in northern Yemen. Salafi clerics at the rally warned the Houthis that they would be willing to deploy fighters to Dammaj.

The Yemeni National Council (an opposition council established on 17 August 2011 to lead the revolution against President Saleh) sent a delegation led by Mussed Al-Radaee, general secretary of the Nasserite Party to Saada. A similar delegation was sent by protesters from Sanaa's Change Square. Neither group had released their report by early December 2011.

On 3 December 2011, in a message posted on jihadist website Shumukh al-Islam, al-Qaeda in the Arabian Peninsula leader Nasir al-Wuhayshi announced they would be deploying fighters to Dammaj to combat the Houthis. Another Yemeni al-Qaeda leader, sheikh Abu Zubair Adil al-Abab, released a statement during a lecture in which he stated al-Qaeda would be providing training to Sunni fighters in Dammaj and warned the Houthis that "You tried our strength, and the day of al-Ghadir is not far from you." Nasir al-Wuhayshi was himself an alumnus of one of Dar al-Hadith's offshoots and, according to Said Obaid, chairman of the Al-Jemhi Centre for Researches and Studies, "graduates of these schools are almost ready to be Al-Qaeda members." On 12 December, an audio message was posted on jihadist websites by al-Qaeda leader Ibrahim al-Rubaish, which declared jihad against Houthi rebels.

== See also ==
- List of modern conflicts in the Middle East
