= Yahya al-Hajuri =

Yemeni Islamic scholar (born 1958)

- يحيى الحجوري
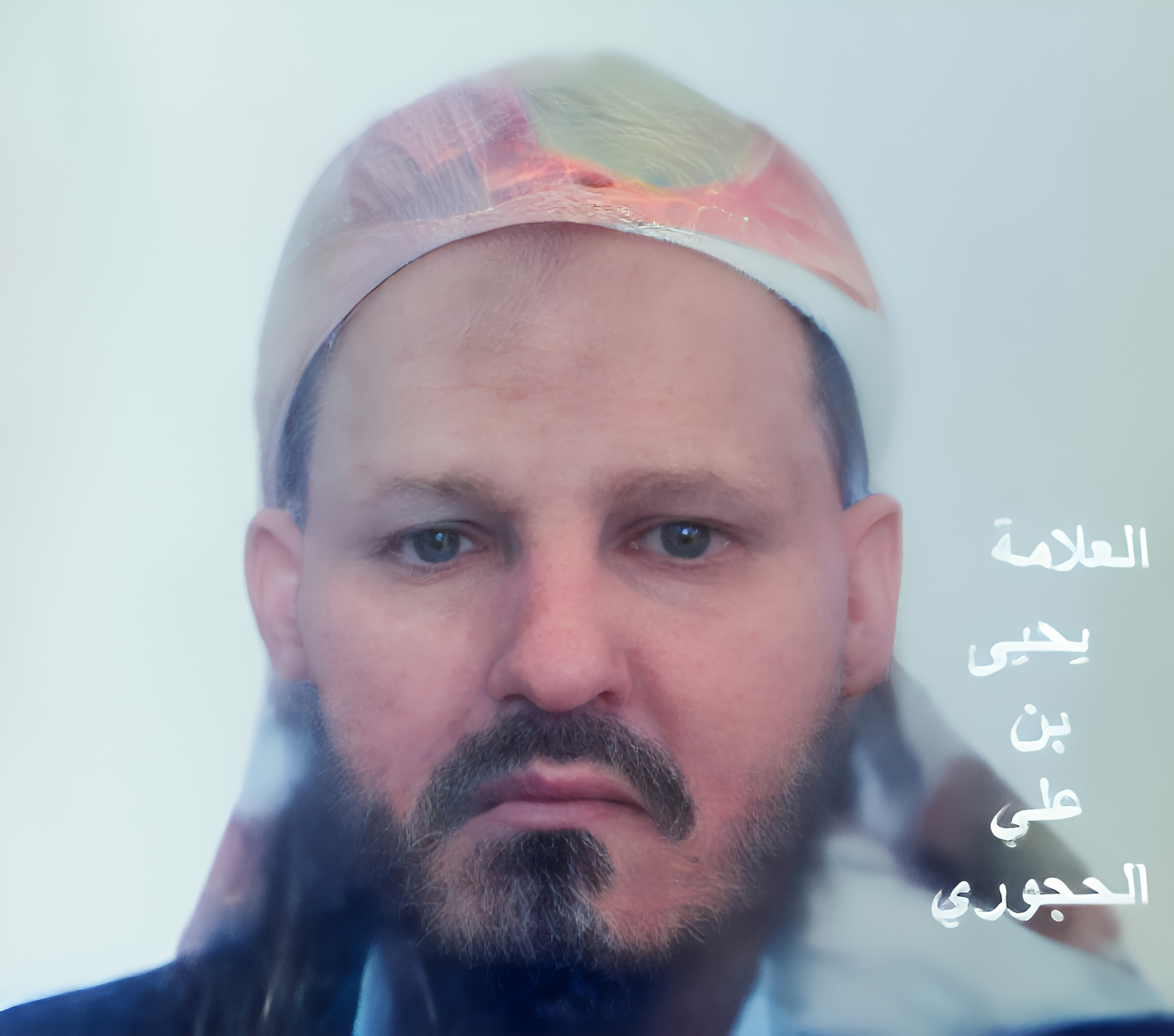
- A personal photo of al-Hajuri from 2025

Personal life
- Born: 1958 (age 67–68) Yemen

Religious life
- Religion: Islam
- Denomination: Sunni
- Jurisprudence: Ghayr Muqallid
- Creed: Athari
- Movement: Salafism

Muslim leader
- Teacher: Muqbil al-Wadi'i

Yahya bin Ali al-Hajuri (Note: Arabic: يحيى بن علي الحجوري) (born 1958) is a Yemeni Islamic scholar working in the Salafi tradition.

== Biography ==
He belongs to the Hajur tribe of northern Yemen. He was trained at the madrasa of al-Wadi'i, one of the leading scholars of Salafism, in Dammaj.

Despite the doctrinal apoliticism of Yemeni Salafism, al-Hajuri has been drawn into the ongoing Yemeni conflict. He was a longtime ally of Ali Abdullah Saleh until the latter's death. As early as 2011, the Houthis fought al-Hajuri for control of Saada province, and laid siege to al-Hajuri's Dammaj institute. He first called for Jihad against the Houthis in 2011.

In 2014, al-Hajuri was forced to leave Dammaj, after Houthis bombed his learning center and threatened further violence against local Salafis in one of the first outbursts of the Houthi-government conflict. On January 19, 2020, renewed clashes between the Houthis and al-Hajuri occurred. On November 1, 2021 another learning center operated by al-Hajuri in Marib Governate was shelled by Houthis, leading to several casualties.

Al-Hajuri has taken a resolutely anti-Qatar stance throughout the conflict. According to pro-Houthi sources, al-Hajuri issued a fatwa condemning Hamas's October 7 attacks. Al-Hajuri was a friend of Hani bin Breik, the vice president of the Southern Transitional Council (STC), and aligned himself with the council. In August 2025, the STC planned to relocate al-Hajuri's learning center from Yafa'a to Mokha to ensure its safety. Al-Hajuri met with leading members of the council at Seiyun in December 2025, briefly before the collapse of the STC.

== Reception ==
Al-Hajuri is one of the prominent students of al-Wadi'i, and is considered one of the leading figures in the Yemeni development of his Salafi thought. Prominent Salafi scholar Saleh al-Fawzan said regarding al-Hajuri: "I have not heard anything concerning him (Yahya al-Hajuri) but good".
