= Khorram Rud Rural District =

Khorram Rud Rural District (Persian: دهستان خرم رود) may refer to:

- Khorram Rud Rural District (Hamadan Province)
- Khorram Rud Rural District (Isfahan Province)
