= Baghshad =

City in Isfahan province, Iran

Baghshad Persian: باغشاد
- City
- Location within Iran
- Coordinates: 32°22′44″N 51°13′55″E
- Country: Iran
- Province: Isfahan
- County: Lenjan
- District: Central
- Established: 2013

Population (2016)
  - Total: 4,356
- Time zone: UTC+3:30 (IRST)

Baghshad (Persian: باغشاد) is a city in the Central District of Lenjan County, Isfahan province, Iran.

== History ==
Baghshad is the merger of the villages of Bagh Shah, Madiseh, and Now Guran in 2013.

== Demographics ==
=== Language ===
Baghshad is a Persian-speaking city.

=== Population ===
At the time of the 2016 National Census, the city's population was 4,356 people in 1,408 households.

== Notable people ==
- Abu l-Hasan al-Isfahani, former Iranian Grand Ayatollah
