= Cham Rud Rural District =

Rural district in Isfahan province, Iran

Cham Rud Rural District Persian: دهستان چم رود
- Rural District
- Location within Iran
- Coordinates: 32°26′N 51°08′E
- Country: Iran
- Province: Isfahan
- County: Lenjan
- District: Bagh-e Bahadoran
- Established: 1987
- Capital: Karchekan

Population (2016)
  - Total: 7,801
- Time zone: UTC+3:30 (IRST)

Cham Rud Rural District (Persian: دهستان چم رود) is in Bagh-e Bahadoran District of Lenjan County, Isfahan province, Iran. Its capital is the village of Karchekan.

== Demographics ==
=== Population ===
At the time of the 2006 National Census, the rural district's population was 8,422 in 2,178 households. There were 8,250 inhabitants in 2,491 households at the following census of 2011. The 2016 census measured the population of the rural district as 7,801 in 2,493 households. The most populous of its 27 villages was Karchekan, with 2,313 people.

=== Other villages in the rural district ===
- Ay Dughmish
- Berenjegan
- Cham-e Pir
- Durak
- Hajji Alvan
- Homam
- Kateh Shur
- Khoshuiyeh
- Murkan
- Qaleh-ye Torki
- Rahmatabad
- Sadeqabad
- Saidabad
- Zard Khoshuiyeh
