= Musa al-Musawi =

Iranian Muslim scholar and writer (1930–1997)

Imam Dr Musa al-Musawi
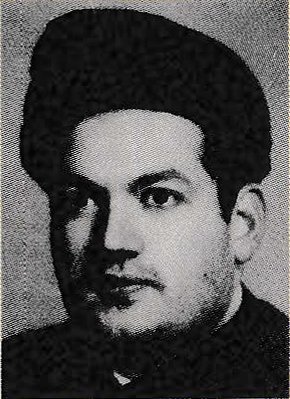
- Musa al-Musawi
- Title: Imam Dr

Personal life
- Born: 1930 Najaf, Mandatory Iraq
- Died: 1997 (aged 66–67) Los Angeles, California, U.S.
- Main interest: Islamic philosophy
- Notable idea: Shia reformism
- Notable work(s): The Miserable Revolution, Shiah:a critical revision
- Occupation: Professor

Religious life
- Religion: Islam

Muslim leader
- Post: Professor of Islamic Economics at the University of Tehran 1960-1963, Lecturer of Islamic Philosophy at the Baghdad University 1968-78 as a professor, Visiting fellow at the Halle University (GDR) and Tripoli University in Libya 1973-1974, Research associate at the Harvard University 1975-1978 and lecturer at the University of California, Los Angeles 1978
- Disciple of: Abu l-Hasan al-Isfahani, Abu al-Qasim al-Khoei
- Influenced by: Abu l-Hasan al-Isfahani, Salafi movement

Musa al-Musawi (1930-1997) was a Muslim scholar and professor of philosophy, he wrote books on philosophy and revisionist texts on Shia Islam. His grandfather was Grand Ayatullah Abu al-Hasan al-Esfahani whom he lived with for 17 years after the assassination of his father. He was educated at Najaf traditional religious school and was awarded the highest certificate in Islamic Law (Ijtihad) from its university. He was also the 20th Majles deputy for Lanjan (1961).

== Timeline of his life ==
- Pursued his studies at the University of Tehran and obtained a doctorate's in Islamic Law in 1955.
- Studied at Sorbonne University where he earned his second doctorates in 1959.
- Professor of Islamic Economics at the University of Tehran 1960–1963.
- Elected deputy for Isfahan in the Iranian Parliament 1960–1963.
- Narrowly escaped death when some Basra based Savak agents of Mohammad Reza Pahlavi, the shah of Iran made an attempt on his life in 1968.
- Lecturer of Islamic Philosophy at the Baghdad University 1968-78 as a professor.
- Was for some time visiting fellow at the Halle University (GDR) and Tripoli University in Libya 1973–1974.
- Became a research associate at the Harvard University 1975-1978 and lecturer at the University of California, Los Angeles 1978.
- Dr Musa al-Musawi ran for the presidential election after the Islamic revolution of Iran, 1980.
- President of the High Islamic Council of the Americas since 1981 and founder of Human rights for Islamic countries from 1992 to 1997.

== Books ==
al-Musawi wrote many books over a variety of topics.

=== Books on Shiite doctrine ===
- al-Shi’a wa-l-tashih: al-Sira’ bayn al-shi’a wa-l-tashayyu’ (the struggle between Shia and Shiism), 160 pages (Los Angeles 1987, Cairo 1989, Paris 1997), is a "refutation" of all parts of Shia Islam in its present existing form, with the author's aim of "purging Shiism of all aberrations and deviations that were inflicted upon it over the course of time."
- al-Sarkha al-kubra. ‘Aqidat al-shi’a fi usul al-din wa-furu’ihi fi ‘asr al-a’imma wa-ba’dahum (Los Angeles 1991)
- Ya shi’at al-‘alam istayqiza (s.l., ca. 1995),
- al-Thawra al-ba’isa (The Miserable Revolution): a critique of Ruhollah Khomeini and the Islamic Republic of Iran.
- al-Mudtahidan

=== Books on Islamic philosophy ===
- Min al-Suhrawardi ila l-Kindi (Beirut 1979)
- Min al-Kindi ila ibn Rushd (Beirut, Paris 1977)
- al-Jadid fi falsafat Sadr al-Din al-Shirazi (Baghdad 1978)

=== Books on contemporary politics within Iran in the 1970s and ‘80s ===
- Iran fi rub qarn (Baghdad 1972)
- al-Thawra al-ba’isa (s.l., ca. 1985)

== Iranian Oral History Project ==
Dr Musa al-Musawi was interviewed for 5 hours by Shahla Haeri for Harvard University's Iranian Oral History Project, the project is a collection of personal accounts of 134 individuals who played major roles in or were eyewitnesses to important political events in Iran from the 1920s to the 1980s. Amongst the people interviewed are Massoud Rajavi, Shapour Bakhtiar, Abolhassan Banisadr and Mehdi Haeri Yazdi.

== See also ==
- Criticism of Twelver Shi'ism
