= Chermahin =

City in Isfahan province, Iran

Chermahin Persian: چرمهين
- City
- Location within Iran
- Coordinates: 32°20′00″N 51°11′23″E
- Country: Iran
- Province: Isfahan
- County: Lenjan
- District: Bagh-e Bahadoran
- Established as a city: 1992

Area
  - Total: 15 km^{2} (5.8 sq mi)
- Elevation: 1,798 m (5,899 ft)

Population (2016)
  - Total: 13,732
  - Density: 920/km^{2} (2,400/sq mi)
- Time zone: UTC+3:30 (IRST)
- Area code: 031-5255
- Website: chermahin.ir

Chermahin (Persian: چرمهين) (Note: Also romanized as Cher Mahīn and Chermahīn; also known as Qal‘eh Charmi) is a city in Bagh-e Bahadoran District of Lenjan County, Isfahan province, Iran. As a village, it was the capital of Zirkuh Rural District (Note: Formerly Chermahin Rural District) until its capital was transferred to the village of Kachuiyeh. Chermahin was converted to a city in 1992.

== Demographics ==
=== Population ===
At the time of the 2006 National Census, the city's population was 12,292 people in 3,035 households. The following census in 2011 counted 13,568 people in 3,650 households. The 2016 census measured the population of the city as 13,732 inhabitants in 3,943 households.
