= Cham Kuh Rural District =

Rural district in Isfahan province, Iran

Cham Kuh Rural District Persian: دهستان چم كوه
- Rural District
- Location within Iran
- Coordinates: 32°26′N 51°01′E
- Country: Iran
- Province: Isfahan
- County: Lenjan
- District: Bagh-e Bahadoran
- Established: 1991
- Capital: Cham-e Yusefali

Population (2016)
  - Total: 5,298
- Time zone: UTC+3:30 (IRST)

Cham Kuh Rural District (Persian: دهستان چم كوه) is in Bagh-e Bahadoran District of Lenjan County, Isfahan province, Iran. Its capital is the village of Cham-e Yusefali.

== Demographics ==
=== Population ===
At the time of the 2006 National Census, the rural district's population was 6,362 in 1,578 households. There were 5,813 inhabitants in 1,703 households at the following census of 2011. The 2016 census measured the population of the rural district as 5,298 in 1,621 households. The most populous of its 18 villages was Cham-e Yusefali, with 1,526 people.

=== Other villages in the rural district ===
- Cham-e Alishah
- Cham-e Heydar
- Cham-e Kahriz
- Cham-e Nur
- Cham-e Taq
- Jafarabad
- Parkestan
- Yal Boland
