= Ashiya =

Ashiya may refer to:

- Ashiya, Hyōgo, Japan
  - Ashiya University, Hyōgo
- Ashiya, Fukuoka, Japan
- Ashiya, a subcaste of Charans from Rajasthan, India
- Mizuki Ashiya, the lead character in the manga series Hana-Kimi
- Ashiya Station (disambiguation)

== See also ==
- Ashiya (disambiguation)
