= Ashiyan, Gilan =

Ashiyan اشيان
- Village
- Location within Iran
- Coordinates: 37°06′55″N 50°05′41″E
- Country: Iran
- Province: Gilan
- County: Langarud
- Bakhsh: Otaqvar
- Rural District: Otaqvar

Population (2006)
  - Total: 238
- Time zone: UTC+3:30 (IRST)
  - Summer (DST): UTC+4:30 (IRDT)

Ashiyan (Persian: اشيان, also Romanized as Āshīyān and Āshīān; also known as Īshīān) is a village in Otaqvar Rural District, Otaqvar District, Langarud County, Gilan Province, Iran. At the 2006 census, its population was 238, in 62 families.
