= Zirkuh Rural District (Lenjan County) =

Rural district in Isfahan province, Iran

Zirkuh Rural District Persian: دهستان زيركوه
- Rural District
- Location within Iran
- Coordinates: 32°18′N 51°10′E
- Country: Iran
- Province: Isfahan
- County: Lenjan
- District: Bagh-e Bahadoran
- Established: 1987
- Capital: Kachuiyeh

Population (2016)
  - Total: 9,552
- Time zone: UTC+3:30 (IRST)

Zirkuh Rural District (Persian: دهستان زيركوه) (Note: Formerly Chermahin Rural District (دهستان چرمهين)) is in Bagh-e Bahadoran District of Lenjan County, Isfahan province, Iran. Its capital is the village of Kachuiyeh. The previous capital of the rural district was the village of Chermahin, now a city.

== Demographics ==
=== Population ===
At the time of the 2006 National Census, the rural district's population was 10,073 in 2,620 households. There were 10,020 inhabitants in 2,937 households at the following census of 2011. The 2016 census measured the population of the rural district as 9,552 in 2,971 households. The most populous of its 25 villages was Kachuiyeh, with 2,493 people.

=== Other villages in the rural district ===
- Cham-e Aseman
- Hajat Aqa
- Hardang
- Kelishad-e Rokh
- Lay Bid
- Qaleh Aqa
- Roknabad
- Shurjeh
- Zamanabad
