= Ashiya Station =

Ashiya Station (芦屋駅) is the name of two train stations in Ashiya, Hyōgo, Japan:

- Ashiya Station (JR West)
- Ashiya Station (Hanshin)
