= Fuladshahr =

City in Isfahan province, Iran

Fuladshahr Persian: فولادشهر
- City
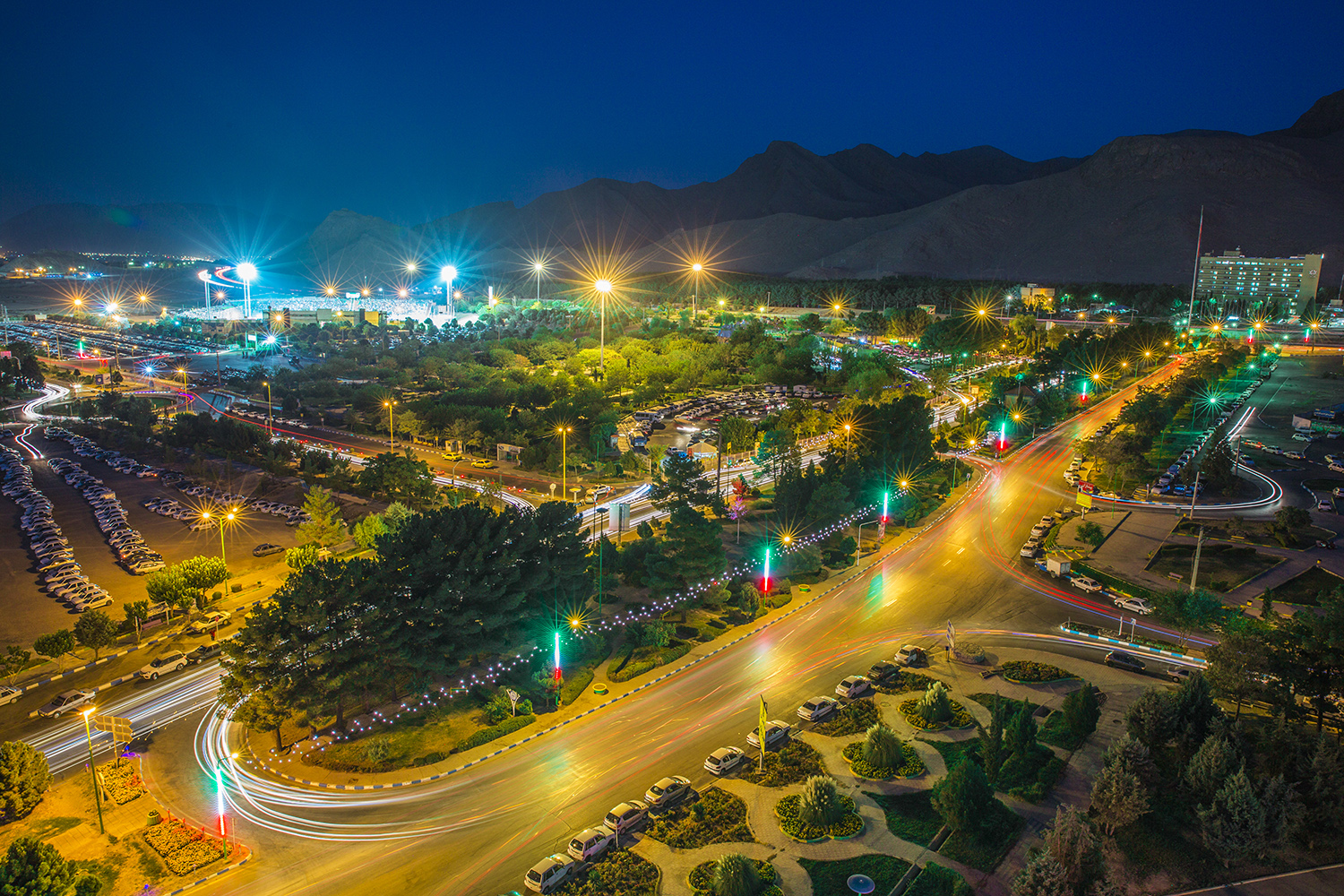
- View of the city of Fuladshahr

- Location within Iran
- Coordinates: 32°29′13″N 51°23′59″E
- Country: Iran
- Province: Isfahan
- County: Lenjan
- District: Fuladshahr
- Arya Shahr: 1964
- Elevation: 1,630 to 1,750 m (5,350 to 5,740 ft)

Population (2016)
  - Total: 88,426
- Time zone: UTC+3:30 (IRST)
- Area code: 031526
- Website: kfis.ir

Fuladshahr (Persian: فولادشهر) (Note: Also romanized as Fūlād Shahr and Fūlādshahr; formerly Pūlād Shahr (English: Steel City)) is a city in, and the capital of, Fuladshahr District in Lenjan County, Isfahan province, Iran. It is also the administrative center for Khorramrud Rural District.

== Demographics ==
=== Population ===
At the time of the 2006 National Census, the city's population was 55,496 in 13,822 households, when it was in the Central District. The following census in 2011 counted 66,903 people in 18,615 households. The 2016 census measured the population of the city as 88,426 people in 26,631 households.

Fuladshahr was separated from the district in the formation of Fuladshahr District in 2012.

== Overview ==
The city is 25 kilometres (16 mi) south of Isfahan and about 100 kilometres (62 mi) north of Shahrekord. It was built during the Shah of Iran period, and was home to the mostly Russian and other employees of the Zob Ahan factory, located near the city. The world's third-largest cement factory at the time, the Siman Sepahan Dizicheh or Siman Arya Dizicheh as it was called before the Iranian revolution, is also near the city.

== Sports ==
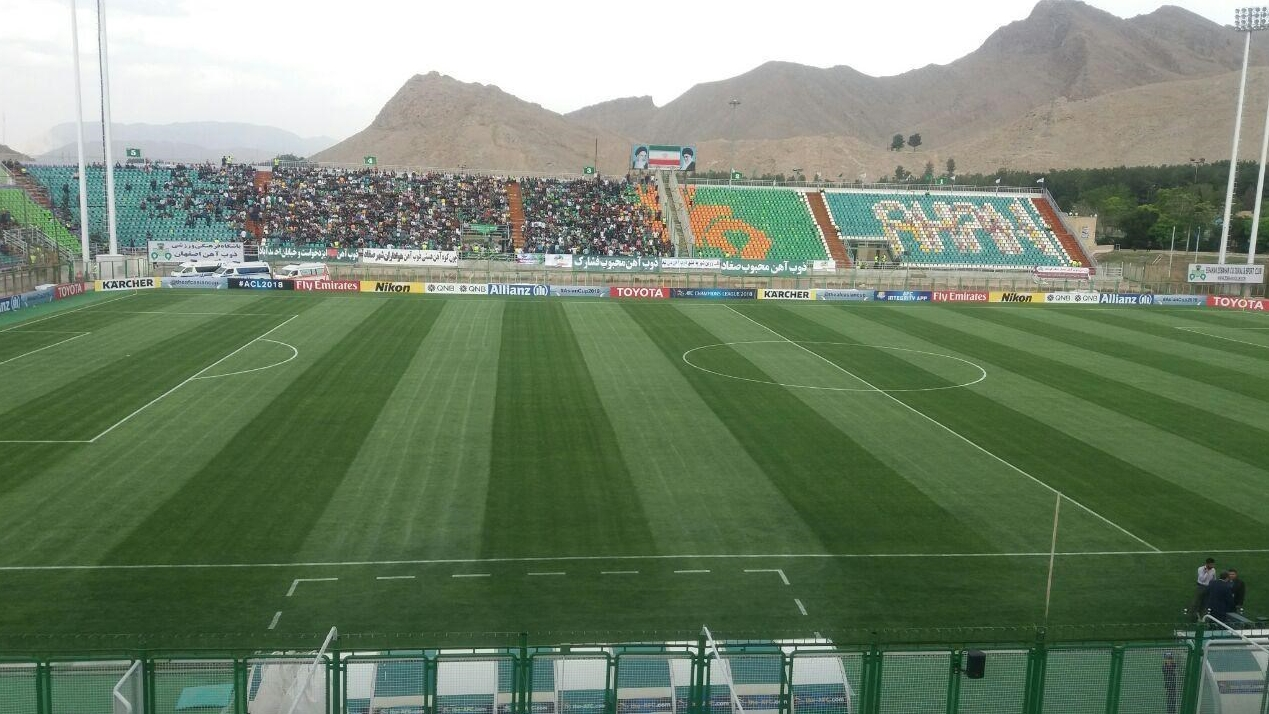
Fuladshahr Stadium

Fuladshahr is home to Fuladshahr Stadium, the permanent home of Zob Ahan.

== Civilian casualties of 2025-2026 Iranian protests in Fuladshahr ==
Beginning on 28 December 2025, mass demonstrations erupted across multiple cities in Iran amid a deepening economic crisis and widespread dissatisfaction with the government. While initially sparked by frustration over skyrocketing inflation, rising food prices, and the severe depreciation of the Iranian rial, the protests quickly evolved into a broader movement demanding an end to the Islamic Republic's rule.

Hengaw Organization of Human Rights reported the killing of Dariush Ansari Bakhtiariwand on Thursday, 1 January 2026, a Lor man from Fuladshahr. He was fatally shot by the repressive forces of the Islamic Republic of Iran.
