= Kariz Rural District =

Rural district in Isfahan province, Iran

Kariz Rural District Persian: دهستان کاریز
- Rural District
- Location within Iran
- Coordinates: 32°17′12″N 51°18′47″E
- Country: Iran
- Province: Isfahan
- County: Lenjan
- District: Central
- Established: 2012
- Capital: Kariz
- Time zone: UTC+3:30 (IRST)

Kariz Rural District (Persian: دهستان کاریز) is in the Central District of Lenjan County, Isfahan province, Iran. Its capital is the village of Kariz, whose population at the time of the 2016 National Census was 314 people in 95 households.

== History ==
Kariz Rural District was created in the Central District in 2012.
