= Dammaj =

Dammaj دماج
- Town
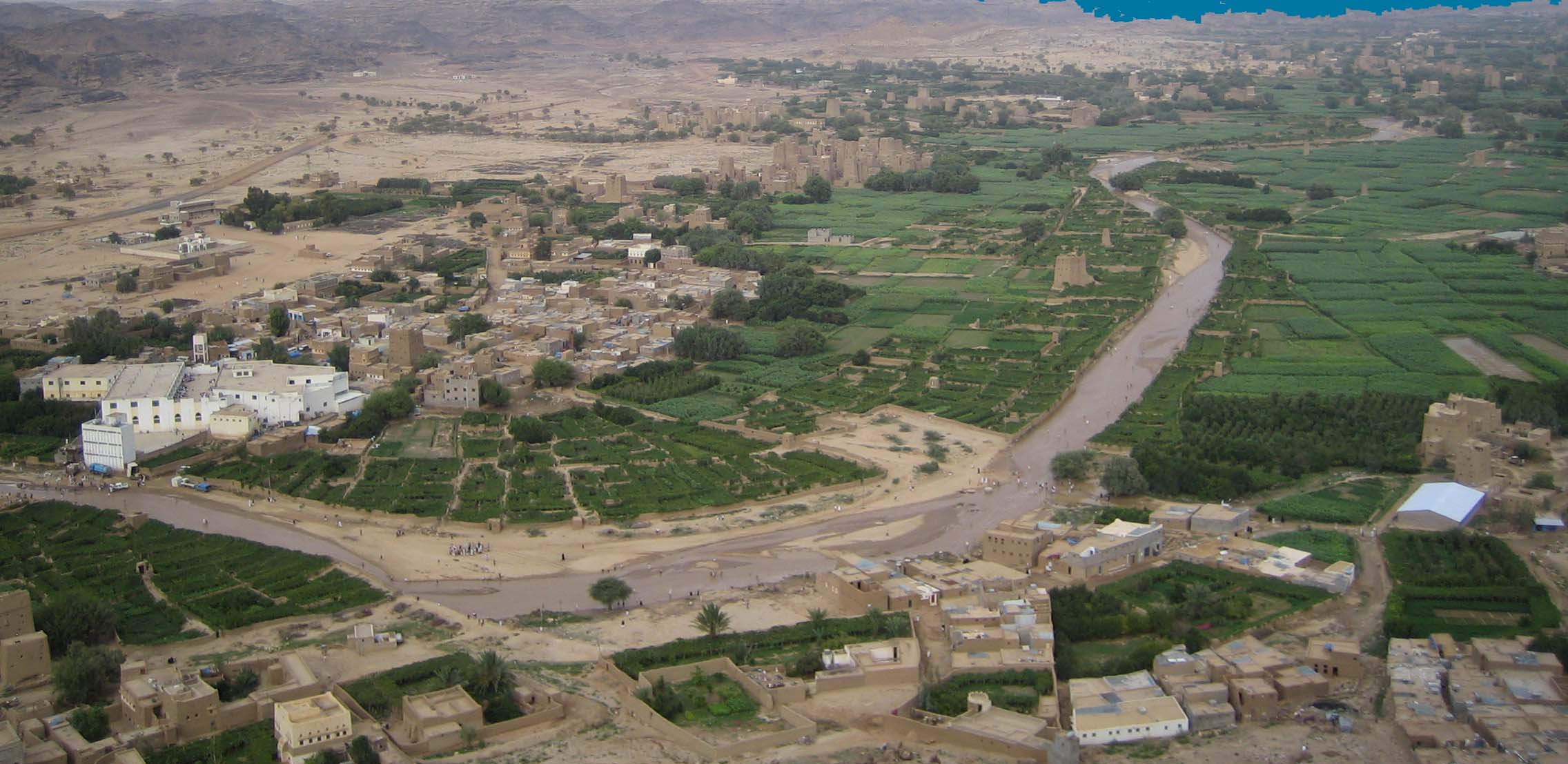
- Dar Al-Hadeeth (left) in Dammaj

- Location in Yemen
- Coordinates: 16°53′38″N 43°48′08″E
- Country: Yemen
- Governorate: Saada Governorate
- District: As Safra

Government
  - Type: Local

Population (2007)
  - Total: 15,626
- Time zone: GMT+3
- Climate: BWh

Dammaj (Arabic: دماج, romanized: Dammāj) is a small town in the Sa'dah Governorate of north-western Yemen, southeast by road from Sa'dah in a valley of the same name.

Muqbil bin Hadi al-Wadi'i established the Madrasah Dar al-Hadith in Dammaj in 1979, an important center of learning for followers of the Salafi creed, who made up the majority of the town. The Salafis reportedly pursued an aggressive "policy of provocation" towards the Zaydi Yemenis who inhabited the surrounding area, often accusing them of apostasy and sometimes even destroying their cemeteries. Despite this, the Salafi school enjoyed the support of both the Saudi and North Yemeni regimes. This situation helped sow the seeds for mounting discontent among the Zaydi population and ultimately Zaydi revivalist movements such as the Houthis. In 2014, the non-local Salafis, including all of the students there, were evicted.

The town was at the target of the Siege of Dammaj, and in November 2013, further sectarian violence between militants of the Houthi-led Shia movement and Sunnis erupted in the town, creating many casualties; some 50 had been killed by the start of the second week. In one incident in late November, a mine exploded as a military vehicle was passing by, killing two Yemeni soldiers.
