= Abu l-Hasan al-Isfahani =

Iranian religious leader (1861–1946)

Grand Ayatollah Sayyid Abu al-Hasan Isfahani
- ابوالحسن موسوی اصفهانی
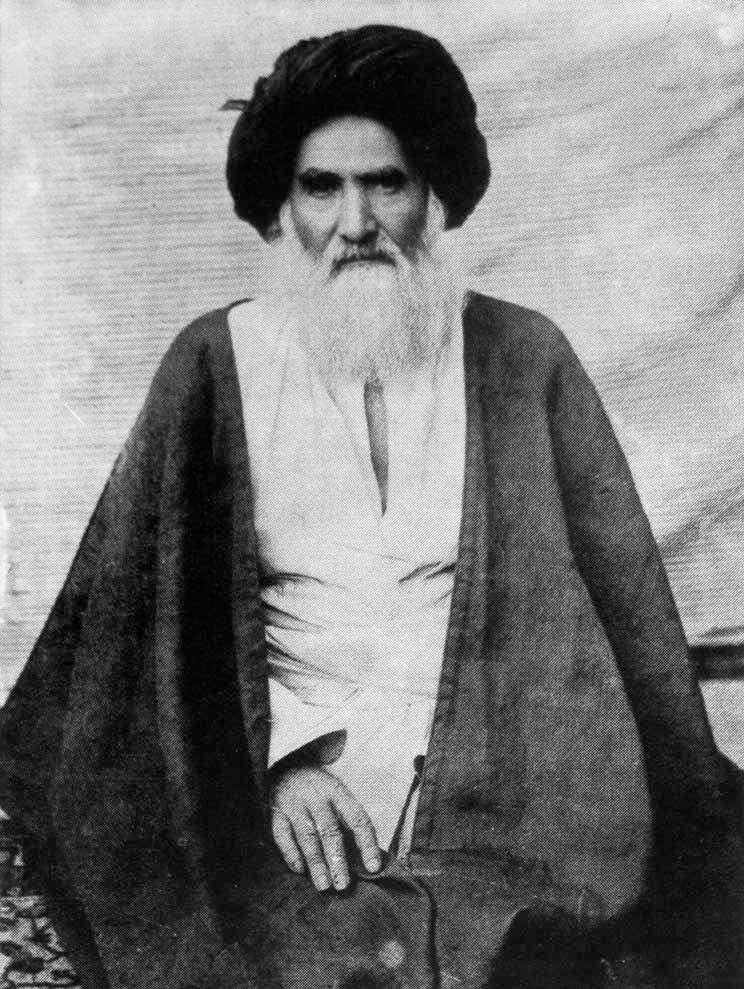
- Title: Grand Ayatollah

Personal life
- Born: 1861 Isfahan, Qajar Iran
- Died: 4 November 1946 (aged 84–85) Kadhimiya, Kingdom of Iraq

Religious life
- Religion: Islam
- Denomination: Twelver Shi'a
- Jurisprudence: Ja'fari

Muslim leader
- Based in: Najaf, Iraq
- Post: Grand Ayatollah
- Period in office: 1937 – 1946
- Predecessor: Muhammad Hossein Naini
- Successor: Hossein Borujerdi

Grand Ayatollah Sayyid Abu al-Hasan Musawi Isfahani (Persian: ابوالحسن موسوی اصفهانی; Arabic: أبوالحسن الموسوي الأصفهاني; 1861 – 4 November 1946) was an Iranian Shia marja'.

Isfahani became the leading marja' of the Shia world after the death of Muhammad-Hussein Naini.

== Biography ==
Isfahani was born in Madiseh to Sayyid Muhammad Isfahani, a renowned alim of Isfahan.

Isfahani passed his preliminary training in Nimarud School in Isfahan and travelled to Najaf in 1890. He joined the lessons of Akhund Khorasani, who soon recognized the talents of his disciple. Isfahani received his degree of Ijtihad from Khorasani. After the death of his contemporary scholar, Ayatollah Mirza Hussein Naini, he became the sole Marja' for most of Shia Muslims. Isfahani was banished to Iran for protecting Iraqi Muslims against colonial policies. Also, he had a strong position about the incidents at the Goharshad Mosque in Mashhad.

Isfahani had a grandson named Musa Musawi who studied with him for 17 years. Musa Musawi was a renowned academic and philosopher, who wrote a revisionist text on Shia Islam where he sought to purify schism from innovation and bring it closer to the majority of Muslims.

== Works ==
In Fiqh, Wasila al-Naja which due to its comprehensive nature, has been elucidated by many Fuqaha including Ruhollah Khomeini.

== Students ==
- Musa Musawi
- Ayatollah Borqei
- Muhsin al-Hakim
- Mohammad Hadi Milani
- Mirza Hashem Amoli
- Muhammad Husayn Tabataba'i
- Mohammad-Taqi Bahjat Foumani
- Sayyed Hassan Musavi Bojnourdi
- Ali Naqi Naqvi

== Death ==
He died in Kadhimiya in 1946.

== See also ==
- Lists of maraji
