= Ashiyana, Lucknow =

Ashiyana
- Interactive map of Ashiyana
- Coordinates: 26.799559°N 80.917397°E
- Country: India
- State: Uttar Pradesh
- District: Lucknow
- Elevation: 127 m (417 ft)

Languages
  - Official: Hindi, Urdu
- Time zone: UTC+5:30 (IST)
- Postal code: 226 012

Ashiyana is one of the major and one among the newest regions in Lucknow, the capital of the state Uttar Pradesh in India. It is connected to Alambagh on one side, Parag on another and extends up to Ruchi Khand. It is located in the southern part of Lucknow District.

Ashiyana, is the location of Fort Jellalabad, locally known in error as Maharaja Bijli Pasi Quila.
