= Muqbil al-Wadi'i =

Yemeni-born Islamic scholar (1933–2001)

Imam Muqbil bin Hadi al-Wadi'i
- مقبل بن هادي الوادعي

Personal life
- Born: 1933 North Yemen
- Died: 21 July 2001 (aged 67-68) Jeddah, Saudi Arabia
- Main interests: Hadith; Aqida
- Education: University of Medina

Religious life
- Religion: Islam
- Denomination: Sunni
- Jurisprudence: Ghayr Muqallid
- Creed: Athari
- Movement: Salafism

Muslim leader
- Influenced by: Muhammad ibn Abd al-Wahhab, Abd Allah ibn Humayd, Ibn Baz, Al-Albani, Ibn Uthaymin
- Influenced: Rabi' al-Madkhali, Yahya al-Hajuri

Muqbil bin Hadi al-Wadi'i (Note: Full name Muqbil ibn Hadi ibn Muqbil al-Wadi'i (Arabic: مقبل بن هادي بن مقبل الوادعي)) (c. 1933 – 21 July 2001) was a Yemeni-born Islamic scholar. He was the founder of the Dar al-Hadith al-Khayriyya, a madrasa in the northern town of Dammaj which became one of the main centres for the Salafi ideology in the country.

Born in northern Yemen to a Zaydi Shia family, al-Wadi'i converted to Sunni Islam in his young age. He travelled to Saudi Arabia where he studied Islam under renowned Salafi scholars such as Abd Allah ibn Humayd, Ibn Baz, Hammad al-Ansari, Muhammad al-Sumali, Abd al-Aziz al-Najdi and several others. In December 1979, al-Wadi'i was arrested by Saudi authorities after having been falsely accused of involvement in the seizure of the Grand Mosque by Juhayman al-Utaybi and his supporters. Upon the insistence of Ibn Baz, al-Wadi'i was released in few months and deported to Yemen where he began preaching Salafism and laid foundation to the Dar al-Hadith al-Khayriyya in 1980.

== Biography ==
Al-Wadi'i was born in c. 1933 near the city of Sa'adah in northern Yemen. He beloneged to the al-Wadi'i tribe and was initially a Zaydi Shia. He left Yemen as a young man and travelled to Saudi Arabia to work and became acquainted with Sunni works of Islamic scholarship, specifically Salafism.

=== Education ===
After finishing his primary education in Yemen, al-Wadi'i spent roughly two decades studying Islam in Saudi Arabia. In 1963 he began by studying at the Salafi teaching centre developed by Muhammad ibn al Uthaymeen in Najran before then being accepted to study at the Islamic University of Madinah where he attended Halaqas led by Hadith scholar Muhammad Nasiruddin al-Albani and Abdul-Ghaffar Hasan Al-Hindi as well as former Grand Mufti Ibn Baz while also studying under Muhammad al-Sumali. Al-Wadi'i is said to have graduated from the Islamic University of Madinah with a master's degree in the science of hadith.

=== Return to Yemen ===
In 1979, his stay in Saudi ended abruptly when he was indicted on suspected involvement in the Grand Mosque Seizure. After spending a few months in prison, Grand Mufti ibn Baz negotiated his release, though al-Wadi'i was forced to return to his home country where he would eventually become known as the father of the modern Salafi movement within Yemen. It was there that he began to spread the Salafi Da'wah in Yemen, with much initial opposition from the local Shafi`is, Ismailis and Zaidis.

Al-Wadi'i went on, soon after his return to his native region, to found and establish an institute that he named Dar al-Hadith al-Khayriyya in Dammaj. It would become one of the most important and influential educational institutions for Salafism in the world, teaching tens of thousands of students ranging from the Arab world to Africa to Southeast Asia and the Western world. It was during this time that Wadi'i, along with Ja'far Umar Thalib, established close ties between Yemeni and Indonesian Salafis.

In the 1980s, al-Wadi'i accepted grants from various sources, such as Ibn Baz and the Saudi government, totaling 15,000 Saudi Riyals every two months. However, his continued critique of the Saudi monarchy,stemming from what he viewed as his wrongful imprisonment, led him to seek financial independence for the institute's operations. Towards the end of his life, while receiving medical treatment in Saudi Arabia prior to his death in 2001, al-Wadi'i expressed regret for his earlier stances and recanted his criticisms of the Saudi state and its leadership. He stated that managing the mosque and institute in Dammaj required little funding and was easily covered by local donations and zakat. Al-Wadi'i was opposed to the Muslim Brotherhood movement. He conceived the Dar al-Hadith as part of an offensive to rebut such Islamist movements.

The Salafis who studied in Dammaj reportedly pursued an aggressive "policy of provocation" towards the Zaydis who inhabited the surrounding area, often accusing them of apostasy and sometimes even destroying their cemeteries. Despite this, the school enjoyed the support of both the Saudi and North Yemeni regimes. This situation helped sow the seeds for mounting discontent among the Zaydi population and ultimately Zaydi revivalist movements such as the Houthis.

In 2014, the Dar al-Hadith would be shut down after a long Siege of Dammaj by Houthi rebels. The manager of the institute, Yahya al-Hajuri, as well as thousands of foreign students were forced to relocate to Al-Hudaydah Governorate.

=== Death ===
After a prolonged illness, and hospital treatment in Jeddah, Saudi Arabia, al-Wadi'i died on July 21, 2001, from either cirrhosis or liver cancer. His funeral prayer was performed in the Masjid al-Haram in Makkah and he was laid to rest in the al-'Adl cemetery close to the graves of Ibn Baz and Ibn Uthaymin.

== Views ==
=== On terrorism ===
Al-Wadi'i made a number of statements against terrorism and said he attempted to advise Osama bin Laden against it, whom he blamed - along with older movements like the Muslim Brotherhood - for many of the problems Muslims face today; he further commented in an interview:

I did in fact send my advice and warning (to bin Laden) but only Allah knows if it actually arrived or not. However, some of those people did come to us, offering their help and assistance in preaching and calling to Allah. Afterwards, we found them sending money, requesting that we distribute it among the leaders of various tribes; they were trying to buy rocket-launchers and machine guns. But I refused them and told them to never come to my house again. I made it clear to them that what we do is preach only and we don’t allow our students to do anything but that.

Al-Wadi'i had earlier authored a book as well, referring to bin Laden as the head of all "sectarianism," "partisanship," "division," and "religious ignorance," and accusing him putting money into weapons while ignoring his religion. Additionally he was a huge supporter of the controversial Saudi preacher Rabi' bin Hadi al-Madkhali. Feircly critiquing the Muslim Brothers, al-Wadi'i states:

"They [the Muslim Brotherhood] are bankrupt as it relates to knowledge and bankrupt as it relates to Daʿwah... The founder of this group – which is Ḥasan al-Bannā – used to make Ṭawāf around the graves...They [the Muslim Brotherhood] are prepared to cooperate with the Devil against Ahl al-Sunnah.”

His Dar al-Hadith seminary and institute of Dammaj was known to oppose al-Qaeda and other Islamist organisations, as al-Wadi'i himself stated in an interview with Hassan al-Zayidi of the Yemen Times in 2000.

=== On Muhammad bin Saleh al-Munajjid ===
Al-Wadi'i was a staunch critic of the scholar Muhammad bin Saleh al-Munajjid, calling him a misguided "Sururi".

=== Links to Guantanamo detainees ===
Joint Task Force Guantanamo counter-terrorism analysts prepared Summary of Evidence memos offering justifications for continuing to hold them in extrajudicial detention. Several of the captives had their detention justified, in part, through their association with al-Wadi'i.

=== His Fiqh ===
In terms of Islamic jurisprudence, al-Wādi'i did not follow any madhhab in Islam and opposed the practice of taqlid (conformity to legal precedence). He even went as far as declaring that following any madhhab is a bid'a (religious innovation or hersey) within Islam. he also held the view that photographs depicting living beings are prohibited.

=== On Yemen ===
Al-Wadi'i believed that even the sinful and corrupt leaders must be obeyed by the Muslims while advising the leader must be done by the learned scholar in private. Additionally, the Muslims are commanded to endure hardship and be patient until God removes the burden of an oppressive ruler for that of a better one, as such is from the fundamentals of the Sunnah.

Al-Wadi'i thought that South Yemen's colonial rule by Britain was better than its independence in 1967, due to the fact that independence had allowed a socialist government to come to power and also resulted in the unnecessary death of Muslims. Although claiming to be neutral by assuming a neutral or apolitical stance, al-Wadi'i maintained excellent relations with the Yemeni government after unification. This was in fact done by his de facto support of the Yemeni government via his stances on issues such as not partaking or calling to elections and political parties or candidates as well as cooperating with the Yemeni government against common enemies such as extreme Zaydi militias and the Muslim Brotherhood's local chapter.

=== On Saudi Arabia ===
While critical of the Saudi government throughout the 1980s and 1990s, al-Wadi'i never compromised by siding with the Sahwa movement and its preachers. He vocally opposed them and their methods of overtly calling to politics and labeled them with hizbiyya, or partisanship. He harbored hard feelings against Saudi Arabia up until toward the end of his life, when he would ultimately recant his criticism, speaking highly of the country and its authorities. As such, the Holy Mosque Establishment of Saudi authorities provided support to many seminaries affiliated with al-Wadi'i.

== Works ==
- al-Ilhad al-Khumayni fi Ard al-Haramayn or the Paganism of al-Khomeini in the Land of the Two Holy Mosques (Criticism of the Iranian Revolution)
