= Shumukh al-Islam =

- Website type: Online forum
- Available in: 3 languages
- List of languages Arabic, English, German
- Founded: 2007
- Founder: Nabil Amdouni
- Current status: Online

Shumukh al-Islam (Arabic: شموخ الإسلام, lit. 'The Glory of Islam') is an online password protected Jihadist forum that disseminates pro-Islamic State and pro-Al-Qaeda ideals and propaganda.

== History ==
The forum was created in 2007 by Nabil Amdouni, it was created as a way to promote recruitment and illicit tutorials. The forum is not as popular as before, but still online, and many have switched from using the forum to just using apps like WhatsApp and Telegram.

=== David Letterman assassination threats ===
In 2011, a forum member under the alias "Umar al-Basrawi" on the forum made death threats and assassination threats to/about David Letterman for mocking Ilyas Kashmiri's death, which a couple days later, Letterman would make jokes about the threats on the Late Show with David Letterman.

=== Group alignment ===
Though the forum has never given an actual stance on if it has a parent group, the forum has shown support to the Islamic State, Al-Qaeda, and splinter groups of Al-Qaeda like Al-Nusra front.
