= Ashiyan-e Jonubi Rural District =

Rural district in Isfahan province, Iran

Ashiyan-e Jonubi Rural District Persian: دهستان اشیان جنوبی
- Rural District
- Location within Iran
- Coordinates: 32°21′N 51°25′E
- Country: Iran
- Province: Isfahan
- County: Lenjan
- District: Central
- Established: 2012
- Capital: Ashiyan
- Time zone: UTC+3:30 (IRST)

Ashiyan-e Jonubi Rural District (Persian: دهستان اشیان جنوبی) is in the Central District of Lenjan County, Isfahan province, Iran. Its capital is the village of Ashiyan, whose population at the time of the 2016 National Census was 884 people in 280 households.

== History ==
Ashiyan-e Jonubi Rural District was created in the Central District in 2012.

== Other villages in the rural district ==
- Qoroq Aqa
