= Ashiyan-e Shomali Rural District =

Rural district in Isfahan province, Iran

Ashiyan-e Shomali Rural District Persian: دهستان اشیان شمالی
- Rural District
- Location within Iran
- Coordinates: 32°23′05″N 51°24′25″E
- Country: Iran
- Province: Isfahan
- County: Lenjan
- District: Fuladshahr
- Established: 1987
- Capital: Mehrabad

Population (2016)
  - Total: 4,812
- Time zone: UTC+3:30 (IRST)

Ashiyan-e Shomali Rural District (Persian: دهستان اشیان شمالی) (Note: Formerly Ashiyan Rural District) is in Fuladshahr District of Lenjan County, Isfahan province, Iran. Its capital is the village of Mehrabad. The previous capital of the rural district was the village of Ashiyan, now in Ashiyan-e Jonubi Rural District.

== Demographics ==
=== Population ===
At the time of the 2006 National Census, the rural district's population (as Ashiyan Rural District of the Central District) was 4,576 in 1,245 households. There were 5,790 inhabitants in 1,622 households at the following census of 2011. The 2016 census measured the population of the rural district as 4,812 in 1,367 households. The most populous of its 18 villages was the Isfahan Defense Industries Complex (مجتمع صنايع دفاع اصفهان), with 2,453 people.

In 2021, the rural district was separated from the district in the formation of Fuladshahr District and renamed Ashiyan-e Shomali Rural District.

=== Other villages in the rural district ===
- Allahabad
- Mobarakabad
