= Khorramrud Rural District (Lenjan County) =

Rural district in Isfahan province, Iran

Khorramrud Rural District Persian: دهستان خرم‌رود
- Rural District
- Location within Iran
- Coordinates: 32°28′N 51°19′E
- Country: Iran
- Province: Isfahan
- County: Lenjan
- District: Fuladshahr
- Established: 1987
- Capital: Fuladshahr

Population (2016)
  - Total: 0
- Time zone: UTC+3:30 (IRST)

Khorramrud Rural District (Persian: دهستان خرم‌رود) is in Fuladshahr District of Lenjan County, Isfahan province, Iran. It is administered from the city of Fuladshahr.

== Demographics ==
=== Population ===
At the time of the 2006 National Census, the rural district's population (as a part of the Central District) was 4,940 in 1,245 households. There were 4,679 inhabitants in 1,367 households at the following census of 2011. The 2016 census measured the population of the rural district as zero.

In 2012, the rural district was separated from the district in the formation of Fuladshahr District.
