= Fuladshahr District =

District in Isfahan province, Iran

Fuladshahr District Persian: بخش فولادشهر
- District
- Location within Iran
- Coordinates: 32°28′N 51°19′E
- Country: Iran
- Province: Isfahan
- County: Lenjan
- Established: 2012
- Capital: Fuladshahr
- Time zone: UTC+3:30 (IRST)

Fuladshahr District (Persian: بخش فولادشهر) is in Lenjan County, Isfahan province, Iran. Its capital is the city of Fuladshahr, whose population at the time of the 2016 National Census was 88,426 in 26,631 households.

== History ==
In 2012, Ashiyan (Note: Renamed Ashiyan-e Shomali Rural District) and Khorramrud Rural Districts, and the city of Fuladshahr, were separated from the Central District in the formation of Fuladshahr District.

Fuladshahr District
Administrative Divisions
Ashiyan-e Shomali RD (Note: Formerly Ashiyan Rural District)
Khorramrud RD
Fuladshahr (city)
RD = Rural District
