= Central District (Lenjan County) =

District in Isfahan province, Iran

Central District (Lenjan County) Persian: بخش مرکزی شهرستان لنجان
- District
- Location within Iran
- Coordinates: 32°19′N 51°19′E
- Country: Iran
- Province: Isfahan
- County: Lenjan
- Capital: Zarrinshahr

Population (2016)
  - Total: 216,249
- Time zone: UTC+3:30 (IRST)

The Central District of Lenjan County (Persian: بخش مرکزی شهرستان لنجان) is in Isfahan province, Iran. Its capital is the city of Zarrinshahr. (Note: Formerly the village of Riz-e Lenjan)

== History ==
In 2012, Ashiyan-e Jonubi and Kariz Rural Districts were created in the district. Ashiyan-e Shomali, Khorram Rud Rural Districts, and the city of Fuladshahr, were separated from it in the formation of Fuladshahr District.

Several villages merged to become the city of Baghshad in 2013.

== Demographics ==
=== Population ===
At the time of the 2006 National Census, the district's population was 179,602 in 46,389 households. The following census in 2011 counted 199,261 people in 57,368 households. The 2016 census measured the population of the district as 216,249 inhabitants in 66,834 households.

=== Administrative divisions ===
Central District (Lenjan County) Population
| Administrative Divisions | 2006 | 2011 | 2016 |
|---|---|---|---|
| Ashiyan-e Jonubi RD (Note: Established after the 2016 census) | | | |
| Ashiyan RD (Note: Transferred to Fuladshahr District after the 2016 census and renamed Ashiyan-e Shomali Rural District; t) | 4,576 | 5,790 | 4,812 |
| Kariz RD | | | |
| Khorramrud RD (Note: Transferred to Fuladshahr District after the 2016 census) | 4,940 | 4,679 | 0 |
| Baghshad (city) (Note: Merger of three villages in 2012) | | | 4,356 |
| Chamgardan (city) | 16,086 | 16,219 | 15,574 |
| Fuladshahr (city) | 55,496 | 66,903 | 88,426 |
| Sedeh Lenjan (city) | 17,335 | 18,654 | 19,101 |
| Varnamkhast (city) | 15,294 | 17,384 | 18,700 |
| Zarrinshahr (city) | 55,984 | 60,118 | 55,817 |
| Zayandehrud (city) | 9,891 | 9,514 | 9,463 |
| Total | 179,602 | 199,261 | 216,249 |
RD = Rural District
