= Bagh-e Bahadoran District =

District in Isfahan province, Iran

Bagh-e Bahadoran District Persian: بخش باغ بهادران
- District
- Location within Iran
- Coordinates: 32°22′N 51°08′E
- Country: Iran
- Province: Isfahan
- County: Lenjan
- Capital: Bagh-e Bahadoran

Population (2016)
  - Total: 46,662
- Time zone: UTC+3:30 (IRST)

Bagh-e Bahadoran District (Persian: بخش باغ بهادران) is in Lenjan County, Isfahan province, Iran. Its capital is the city of Bagh-e Bahadoran.

== Demographics ==
=== Population ===
At the time of the 2006 National Census, the district's population was 45,957 in 11,843 households. The following census in 2011 counted 47,249 people in 13,686 households. The 2016 census measured the population of the district as 46,662 inhabitants in 14,266 households.

=== Administrative divisions ===
Bagh-e Bahadoran District Population
Administrative Divisions	2006	2011	2016
Cham Kuh RD	6,362	5,813	5,298
Cham Rud RD	8,422	8,250	7,801
Zirkuh RD (Note: Formerly Chermahin Rural District)	10,073	10,020	9,552
Bagh-e Bahadoran (city)	8,808	9,598	10,279
Chermahin (city)	12,292	13,568	13,732
Total	45,957	47,249	46,662
RD = Rural District
