= Lenjan County =

County in Isfahan province, Iran

Lenjan County Persian: شهرستان لنجان
- County
- Location of Lenjan County in Isfahan province (center left, green)

- Location of Isfahan province in Iran
- Coordinates: 32°21′N 51°11′E
- Country: Iran
- Province: Isfahan
- Capital: Zarrinshahr
- Districts: Central, Bagh-e Bahadoran, Fuladshahr

Population (2016)
  - Total: 262,912
- Time zone: UTC+3:30 (IRST)

Lenjan County (Persian: شهرستان لنجان) is in Isfahan province, Iran. Its capital is the city of Zarrinshahr. (Note: Formerly the village of Riz-e Lenjan)

== History ==
In 2012, Ashiyan (Note: Renamed Ashiyan-e Shomali Rural District) and Khorramrud Rural Districts, and the city of Fuladshahr, were separated from the Central District in the formation of Fuladshahr District.

Several villages merged to become the city of Baghshad in 2013.

== Demographics ==
=== Population ===
At the time of the 2006 National Census, the county's population was 225,559 in 58,232 households. The following census in 2011 counted 246,510 people in 71,028 households. The 2016 census measured the population of the county as 262,912 in 81,101 households.

=== Administrative divisions ===
Lenjan County's population history and administrative structure over three consecutive censuses are shown in the following table.

Lenjan County Population
Administrative Divisions	2006	2011	2016
Central District	179,602	199,261	216,249
Ashiyan-e Jonubi RD (Note: Established after the 2016 census)			
Ashiyan RD	4,576	5,790	4,812
Kariz RD			
Khorramrud RD	4,940	4,679	0
Baghshad (city) (Note: Merger of three villages in 2012)			4,356
Chamgordan (city)	16,086	16,219	15,574
Fuladshahr (city)	55,496	66,903	88,426
Sedeh Lenjan (city)	17,335	18,654	19,101
Varnamkhast (city)	15,294	17,384	18,700
Zarrinshahr (city)	55,984	60,118	55,817
Zayandehrud (city)	9,891	9,514	9,463
Bagh-e Bahadoran District	45,957	47,249	46,662
Cham Kuh RD	6,362	5,813	5,298
Cham Rud RD	8,422	8,250	7,801
Zirkuh RD (Note: Formerly Chermahin Rural District)	10,073	10,020	9,552
Bagh-e Bahadoran (city)	8,808	9,598	10,279
Chermahin (city)	12,292	13,568	13,732
Fuladshahr District			
Ashiyan-e Shomali RD (Note: Formerly Ashiyan Rural District)			
Khorramrud RD			
Fuladshahr (city)			
Total	225,559	246,510	262,912
RD = Rural District

== Economy ==
Lenjan County is the location of Isfahan Steel Mill. It is on the banks of the Zayandeh River, the largest river in Isfahan province. Farming is an important source of income, and the most important product in Lenjan is rice.

== Government ==
Hossein Rajaei Rizi is the representative of Lenjan in Islamic Consultative Assembly.

== Transportation ==
The main route passing through the county is Road 51, connecting population centres to Isfahan and Shahrekord.

Lenjan County has its own Transit Bus system named Lenjan County Mass Transit Organization.

== See also ==
Media related to Lenjan County at Wikimedia Commons
