= Jowshaqan =

Jowshaqan or Jowsheqan or Jushaqan or Jushqan or Jusheqan (Persian: جوشقان) may refer to:

- Jowsheqan va Kamu, a city in Kashan County, Isfahan province, Iran
- Jowshaqan-e Qali, Iran, a city in Kashan County, Isfahan province, Iran
- Jowshaqan-e Qali Rural District, an administrative division of Kashan County, Isfahan province
- Jusheqan-e Estark, a village in Kashan County, Isfahan province, Iran
- Jushqan, Markazi, a village in Saveh County, Markazi province, Iran
- Jowshaqan, Esfarayen, a village in Esfarayen County, North Khorasan province, Iran
- Jushqan, Jajrom, a village in Jajarm County, North Khorasan province, Iran
