= Shadian =

Shadian or Shadeyan or Shadiyan (Persian: شاديان) may refer to:

- Shadian, Armenian Շադեան
- Shadian, Afghanistan
- Shadian, Isfahan
- Shadian, Kerman
- Shadian District, Iran
- Shadian (沙甸镇), part of Gejiu, China
  - Shadian incident of 1975
