= Khorramdasht (disambiguation) =

Khorramdasht is a city in Qazvin Province, Iran.

Khorramdasht or Khorram Dasht (Persian: خرمدشت) may also refer to various places in Iran:

- Khorram Dasht, Kashan, Isfahan Province
- Khorramdasht, Nain, Isfahan Province
- Khorramdasht District, in Qazvin Province
- Khorram Dasht Rural District (disambiguation)
