= Natanz and Qamsar (electoral district) =

Constituency of the Iranian parliament

- Electoral district constituency for the Isfahan
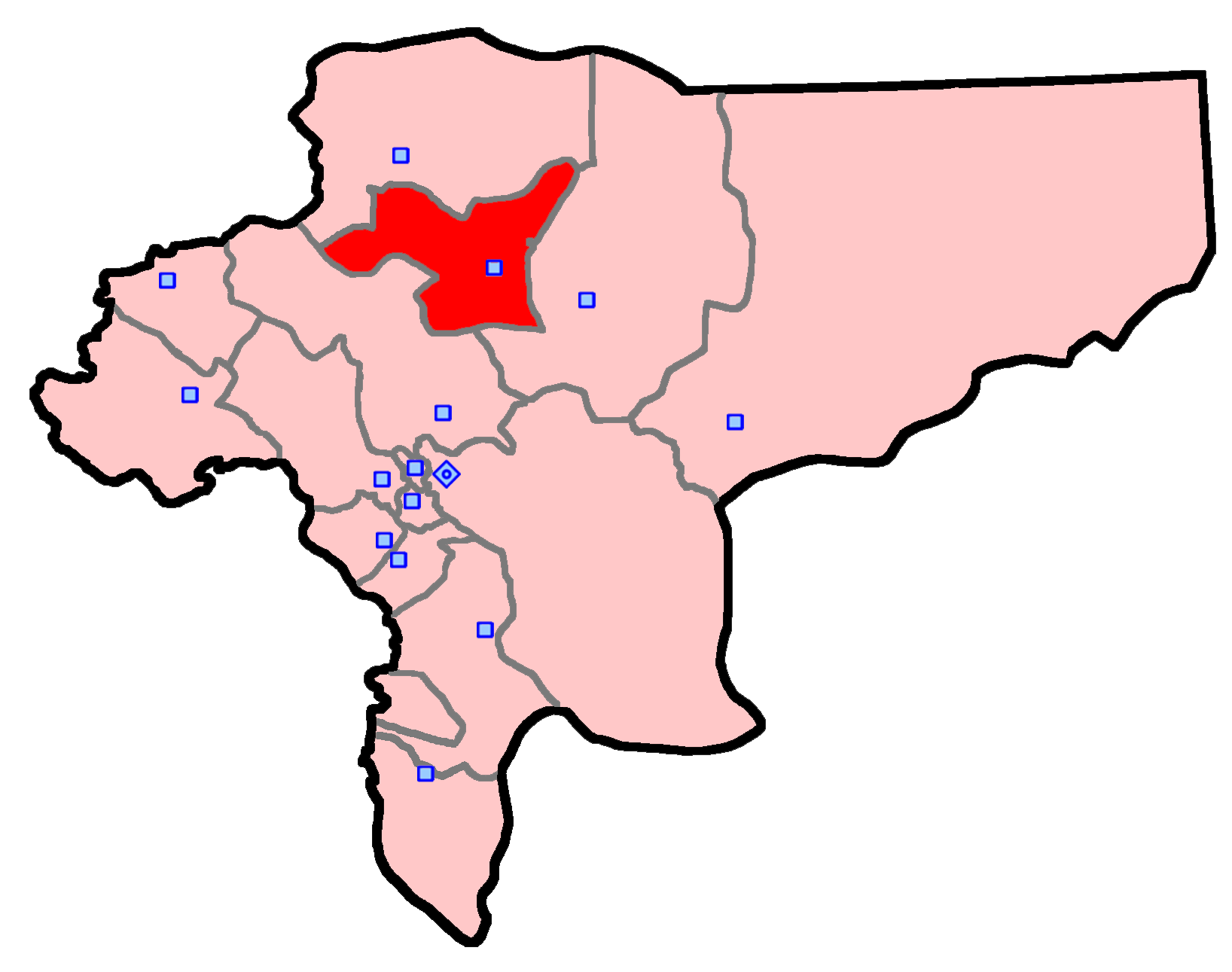
- Natanz, and Qamsar shown within Isfahan Province
- Region: Central District (Natanz County), Emamzadeh District, and Qamsar District

Current constituency
- Assembly Members: Morteza Saffari Natanzi

Natanz and Qamsar (electoral district) is an electoral district in the Isfahan Province of Iran. This electoral district elects 1 member of parliament.
