= Yazdabad, Kashan =

Village in Isfahan province, Iran

Yazdabad Persian: يزداباد
- Village
- Location within Iran
- Coordinates: 33°56′14″N 51°25′04″E
- Country: Iran
- Province: Isfahan
- County: Kashan
- District: Central
- Rural District: Kuhpayeh

Population (2016)
  - Total: 248
- Time zone: UTC+3:30 (IRST)

Yazdabad (Persian: يزداباد) (Note: Also romanized as Yazdābād) is a village in Kuhpayeh Rural District of the Central District in Kashan County, Isfahan province, Iran.

== Demographics ==
=== Population ===
At the time of the 2006 National Census, the village's population was 165 in 41 households. The following census in 2011 counted 164 people in 46 households. The 2016 census measured the population of the village as 248 people in 73 households.
