= Darreh, Isfahan =

Village in Isfahan province, Iran

Darreh Persian: دره
- Village
- Location within Iran
- Coordinates: 33°52′41″N 51°19′41″E
- Country: Iran
- Province: Isfahan
- County: Kashan
- District: Central
- Rural District: Kuhpayeh

Population (2016)
  - Total: 492
- Time zone: UTC+3:30 (IRST)

Darreh (Persian: دره) (Note: Also romanized as Dorreh) is a village in Kuhpayeh Rural District of the Central District in Kashan County, Isfahan province, Iran.

== Demographics ==
=== Population ===
At the time of the 2006 National Census, the village's population was 367 in 111 households. The following census in 2011 counted 292 people in 95 households. The 2016 census measured the population of the village as 492 people in 166 households.
