= Ab-e Sefidab =

Village in Isfahan province, Iran

Ab-e Sefidab Persian: اب سفيداب
- Village
- Country: Iran
- Province: Isfahan
- County: Kashan
- District: Central
- Rural District: Kuhpayeh

Population (2016)
  - Total: 443
- Time zone: UTC+3:30 (IRST)

Ab-e Sefidab (Persian: اب سفيداب) (Note: Also romanized as Āb-e Sefīdāb) is a village in Kuhpayeh Rural District of the Central District in Kashan County, Isfahan province, Iran.

== Demographics ==
=== Population ===
At the time of the 2006 National Census, the village's population was 112 in 25 households. The following census in 2011 counted 398 people in 34 households. The 2016 census measured the population of the village as 443 people in 55 households.
