= Arenjan =

Village in Isfahan province, Iran

Arenjan Persian: ارنجن
- Village
- Location within Iran
- Coordinates: 33°41′36″N 51°04′18″E
- Country: Iran
- Province: Isfahan
- County: Kashan
- District: Barzok
- Rural District: Golab

Population (2016)
  - Total: 277
- Time zone: UTC+3:30 (IRST)

Arenjan (Persian: ارنجن) (Note: Also romanized as Ārenjan; also known as Ārenjīn and Arinjin) is a village in Golab Rural District of Barzok District in Kashan County, Isfahan province, Iran.

== Demographics ==
=== Population ===
At the time of the 2006 National Census, the village's population was 146 in 45 households. The following census in 2011 counted 228 people in 64 households. The 2016 census measured the population of the village as 277 people in 91 households.
