= Azaran, Isfahan =

Village in Isfahan province, Iran

Azaran Persian: ازران
- Village
- Location within Iran
- Coordinates: 33°42′45″N 51°07′50″E
- Country: Iran
- Province: Isfahan
- County: Kashan
- District: Barzok
- Rural District: Golab

Population (2016)
  - Total: 1,632
- Time zone: UTC+3:30 (IRST)

Azaran (Persian: آذَران) (Note: Also romanized as Āzarān, Āzerān, and Azrān; also known as Āzar) is a village in Golab Rural District of Barzok District in Kashan County, Isfahan province, Iran.

== Demographics ==
=== Population ===
At the time of the 2006 National Census, the village's population was 1,017 in 292 households. The following census in 2011 counted 1,111 people in 361 households. The 2016 census measured the population of the village as 1,632 people in 554 households.
