= Yahyaabad-e Bala =

Village in Isfahan province, Iran

Yahyaabad Persian: يحيي ابادبالا
- Village
- Location within Iran
- Coordinates: 34°13′57″N 51°04′35″E
- Country: Iran
- Province: Isfahan
- County: Kashan
- District: Central
- Rural District: Miyandasht

Population (2016)
  - Total: 66
- Time zone: UTC+3:30 (IRST)

Yahyaabad-e Bala (Persian: يحيي ابادبالا) (Note: Also romanized as Yahyáābād-e Bālā; also known as Yahyáābād and Yaḩyáābād-e ‘Olyā) is a village in Miyandasht Rural District of the Central District in Kashan County, Isfahan province, Iran.

== Demographics ==
=== Population ===
At the time of the 2006 National Census, the village's population was 22 in nine households. The following census in 2011 counted 48 people in 21 households. The 2016 census measured the population of the village as 66 people in 24 households.
