= Moslemabad, Isfahan =

Village in Isfahan province, Iran

Moslemabad Persian: مسلم اباد
- Village
- Location within Iran
- Coordinates: 33°47′07″N 51°30′01″E
- Country: Iran
- Province: Isfahan
- County: Kashan
- District: Qamsar
- Rural District: Qohrud

Population (2016)
  - Total: 106
- Time zone: UTC+3:30 (IRST)

Moslemabad (Persian: مسلم اباد) (Note: Also romanized as Moslemābād) is a village in Qohrud Rural District of Qamsar District in Kashan County, Isfahan province, Iran.

== Demographics ==
=== Population ===
At the time of the 2006 National Census, the village's population was 62 in 22 households. The following census in 2011 counted nine people in five households. The 2016 census measured the population of the village as 106 people in 38 households.
