= Khonb =

Village in Isfahan province, Iran

Khonb Persian: خنب
- Village
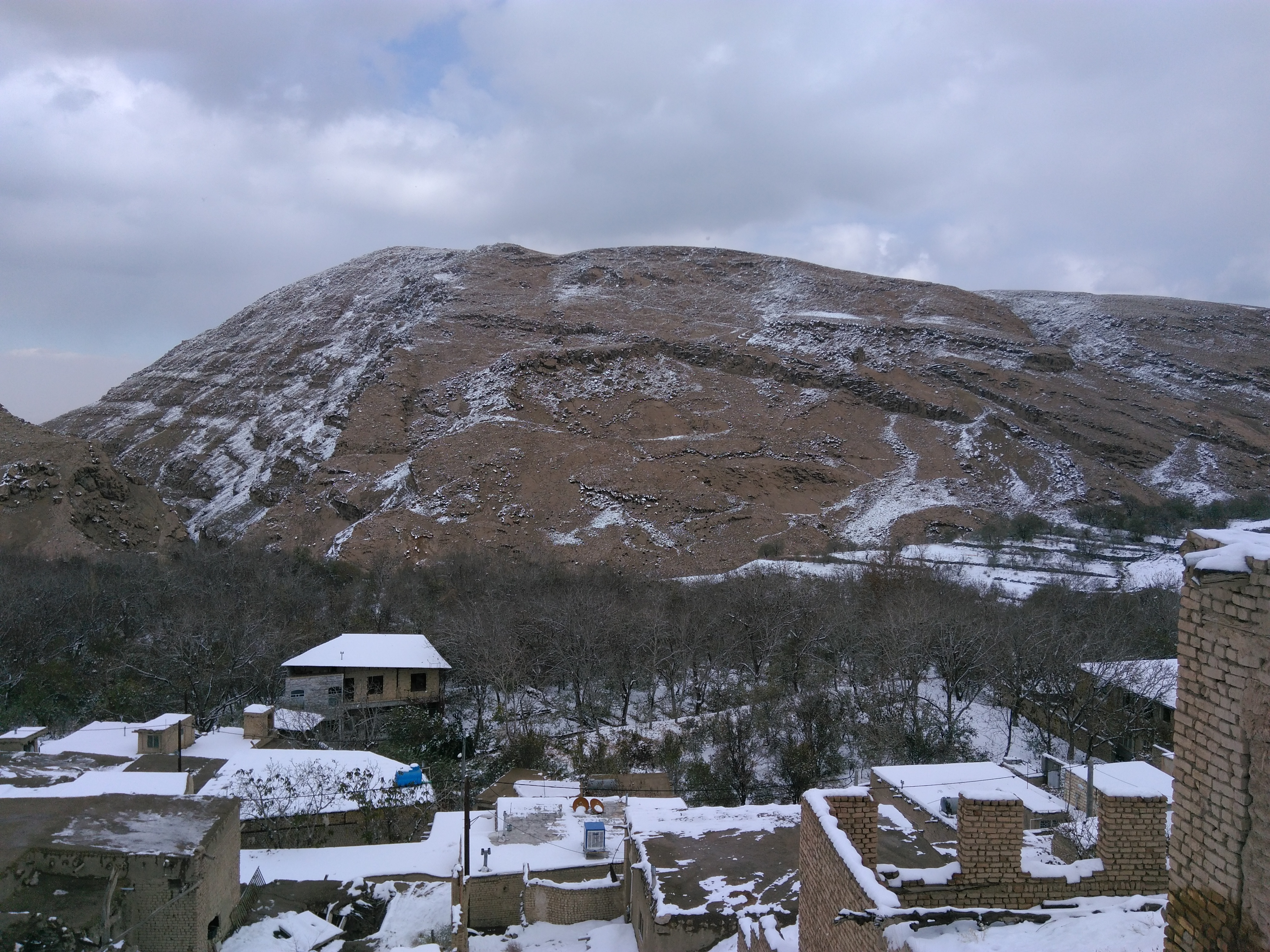
- The village of Khonb

- Location within Iran
- Coordinates: 33°52′22″N 51°22′17″E
- Country: Iran
- Province: Isfahan
- County: Kashan
- District: Central
- Rural District: Kuhpayeh

Population (2016)
  - Total: 314
- Time zone: UTC+3:30 (IRST)

Khonb (Persian: خنب) (Note: Also known as Khum) is a village in Kuhpayeh Rural District of the Central District in Kashan County, Isfahan province, Iran.

== Demographics ==
=== Population ===
At the time of the 2006 National Census, the village's population was 289 in 75 households. The following census in 2011 counted 252 people in 73 households. The 2016 census measured the population of the village as 314 people in 97 households.
