= Viduja =

Village in Isfahan province, Iran

Viduja Persian: ويدوجا
- Village
- Location within Iran
- Coordinates: 33°50′25″N 51°08′48″E
- Country: Iran
- Province: Isfahan
- County: Kashan
- District: Barzok
- Rural District: Golab

Population (2016)
  - Total: 1,346
- Time zone: UTC+3:30 (IRST)

Viduja (Persian: ويدوجا) (Note: Also romanized as Vīdūjā; also known as Vīdjā and Vīdujāh) is a village in Golab Rural District of Barzok District in Kashan County, Isfahan province, Iran.

== Demographics ==
=== Population ===
At the time of the 2006 National Census, the village's population was 947 in 286 households. The following census in 2011 counted 1,049 people in 352 households. The 2016 census measured the population of the village as 1,346 people in 437 households.
