= Varkan =

Village in Isfahan province, Iran

Varkan Persian: وركان
- Village
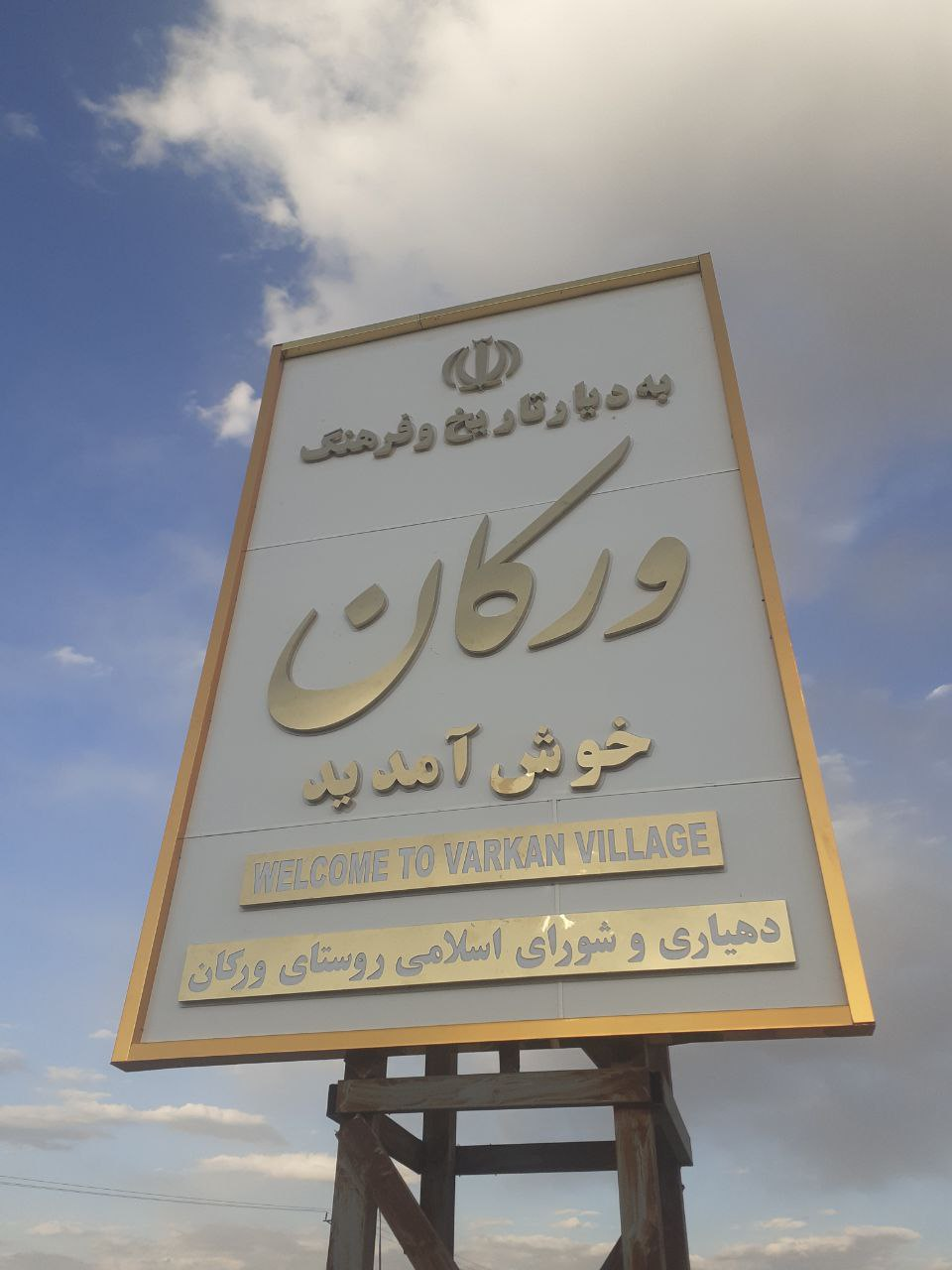
- Entrance sign to the village of Varkan

- Location within Iran
- Coordinates: 33°42′56″N 51°02′57″E
- Country: Iran
- Province: Isfahan
- County: Kashan
- District: Barzok
- Rural District: Golab

Population (2016)
  - Total: 796
- Time zone: UTC+3:30 (IRST)

Varkan (Persian: وركان) (Note: Also romanized as Varkān and Warkān) is a village in Golab Rural District of Barzok District in Kashan County, Isfahan province, Iran.

The Varkan region was historically considered an imperative strategic area because of its unique location and natural resources and it was the residence of significant figures in its prime times. Its archeological and historic significance is still evident now.

== Demographics ==
=== Language ===
The people of Varkan speak "Raji" dialect whose structure and formation clearly demonstrate its roots in ancient Persian literature.

=== Population ===
At the time of the 2006 National Census, the village's population was 545 in 194 households. The following census in 2011 counted 698 people in 230 households. The 2016 census measured the population of the village as 796 people in 309 households.
