= Totmach =

Village in Isfahan province, Iran

Totmach Persian: تتماج
- Village
- Location within Iran
- Coordinates: 33°41′24″N 51°37′21″E
- Country: Iran
- Province: Isfahan
- County: Kashan
- District: Central
- Rural District: Khorramdasht

Population (2016)
  - Total: 66
- Time zone: UTC+3:30 (IRST)

Totmach (Persian: تتماچ) (Note: Also romanized as Totmāch; also known as Totmāj) is a village in Khorramdasht Rural District of the Central District in Kashan County, Isfahan province, Iran.

== Demographics ==
=== Population ===
At the time of the 2006 National Census, the village's population was 71 in 40 households. The following census in 2011 counted 40 people in 27 households. The 2016 census measured the population of the village as 66 people in 34 households.
