= Khozaq =

Village in Isfahan province, Iran

Khozaq Persian: خزاق
- Village
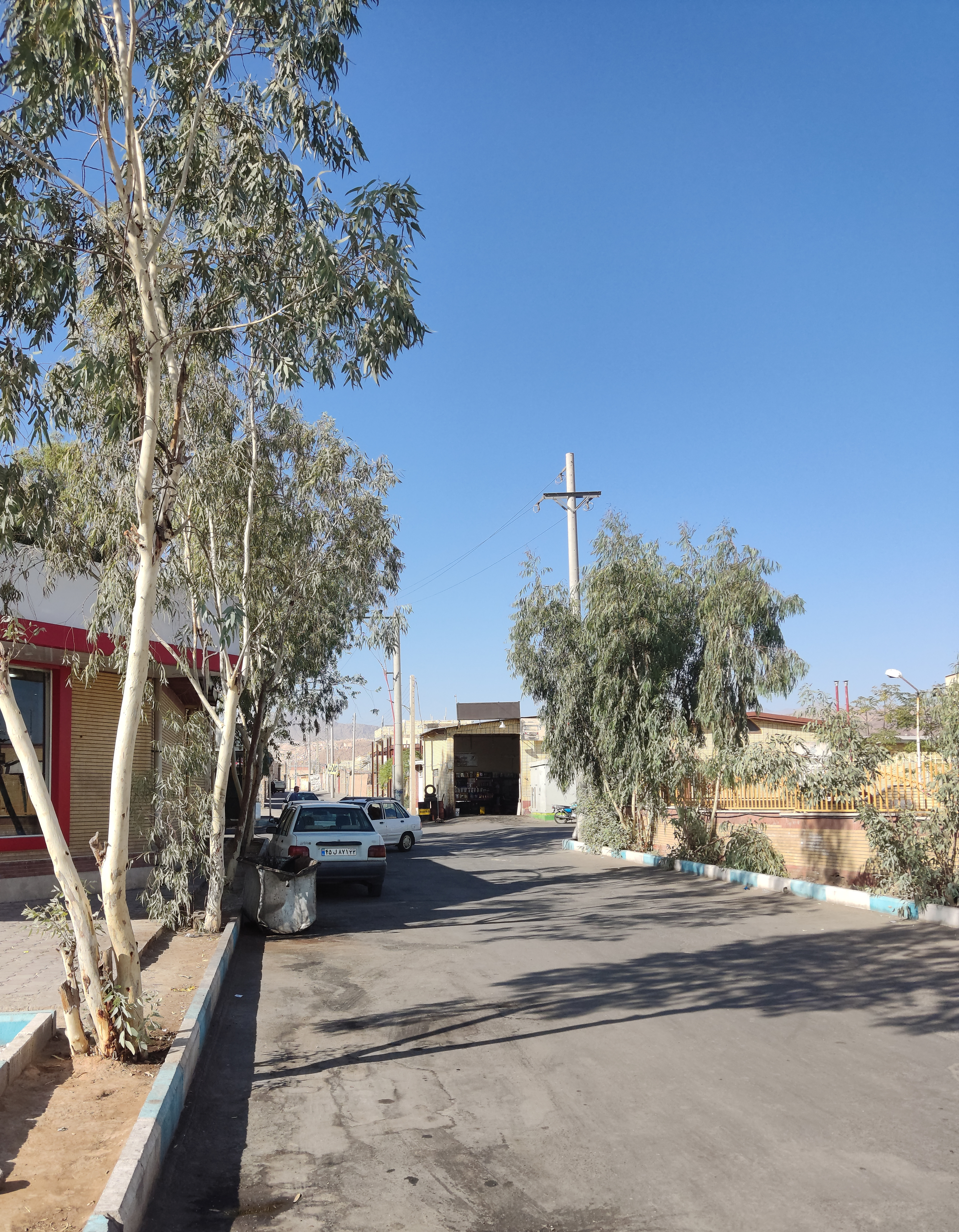
- The village of Khozaq

- Location within Iran
- Coordinates: 34°01′53″N 51°18′56″E
- Country: Iran
- Province: Isfahan
- County: Kashan
- District: Central
- Rural District: Miyandasht

Population (2016)
  - Total: 1,315
- Time zone: UTC+3:30 (IRST)

Khozaq (Persian: خزاق) (Note: Also romanized as Khozāq and Khozzāq; also known as Khazagh and Qazzāq) is a village in Miyandasht Rural District of the Central District in Kashan County, Isfahan province, Iran.

== Demographics ==
=== Population ===
At the time of the 2006 National Census, the village's population was 1,326 in 341 households. The following census in 2011 counted 1,436 people in 407 households. The 2016 census measured the population of the village as 1,315 people in 417 households.
