= Nabar =

Village in Isfahan province, Iran

Nabar Persian: نابر
- Village
- Location within Iran
- Coordinates: 33°52′17″N 51°12′12″E
- Country: Iran
- Province: Isfahan
- County: Kashan
- District: Barzok
- Rural District: Babaafzal

Population (2016)
  - Total: 125
- Time zone: UTC+3:30 (IRST)

Nabar (Persian: نابر) (Note: Also romanized as Nābar) is a village in Babaafzal Rural District (Note: Formerly Barzok Rural District) of Barzok District in Kashan County, Isfahan province, Iran.

== Demographics ==
=== Population ===
At the time of the 2006 National Census, the village's population was 106 in 33 households. The following census in 2011 counted 81 people in 30 households. The 2016 census measured the population of the village as 125 people in 43 households.
