= Ab Shirin, Isfahan =

Village in Isfahan province, Iran

Ab Shirin Persian: اب شيرين
- Village
- Location within Iran
- Coordinates: 34°17′45″N 51°17′24″E
- Country: Iran
- Province: Isfahan
- County: Kashan
- District: Central
- Rural District: Miyandasht

Population (2016)
  - Total: 941
- Time zone: UTC+3:30 (IRST)

Ab Shirin (Persian: اب شيرين) (Note: Also romanized as Āb Shīrīn, Āb-e Shīrīn, and Āb-i-Shirīn) is a village in Miyandasht Rural District of the Central District in Kashan County, Isfahan province, Iran.

== Demographics ==
=== Population ===
At the time of the 2006 National Census, the village's population was 992 in 265 households. The following census in 2011 counted 935 people in 295 households. The 2016 census measured the population of the village as 941 people in 302 households.
