= Maraq, Isfahan =

Village in Isfahan province, Iran

Maraq Persian: مرق
- Village
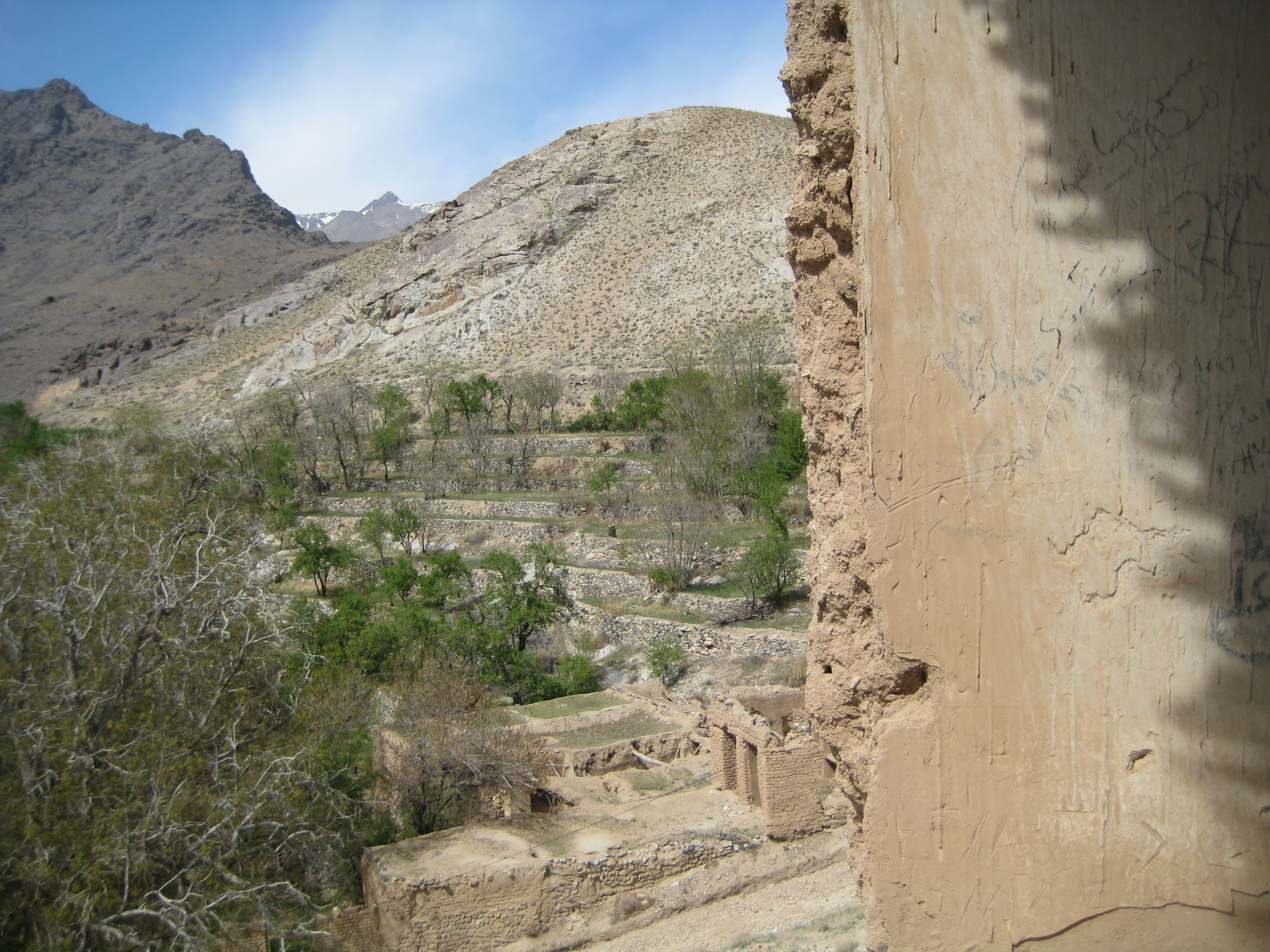
- The village of Maraq

- Location within Iran
- Coordinates: 33°54′22″N 51°09′10″E
- Country: Iran
- Province: Isfahan
- County: Kashan
- District: Barzok
- Rural District: Babaafzal

Population (2016)
  - Total: 1,646
- Time zone: UTC+3:30 (IRST)

Maraq (Persian: مرق) (Note: Also known as Marāk) is a village in, and the capital of, Babaafzal Rural District (Note: Formerly Barzok Rural District) in Barzok District of Kashan County, Isfahan province, Iran. The previous capital of the rural district was the village of Barzok, now a city.

== Demographics ==
=== Population ===
At the time of the 2006 National Census, the village's population was 1,300 in 425 households. The following census in 2011 counted 1,385 people in 399 households. The 2016 census measured the population of the village as 1,646 people in 556 households, the most populous in its rural district.
