= Qohrud =

Village in Isfahan province, Iran

Qohrud Persian: قهرود
- Village
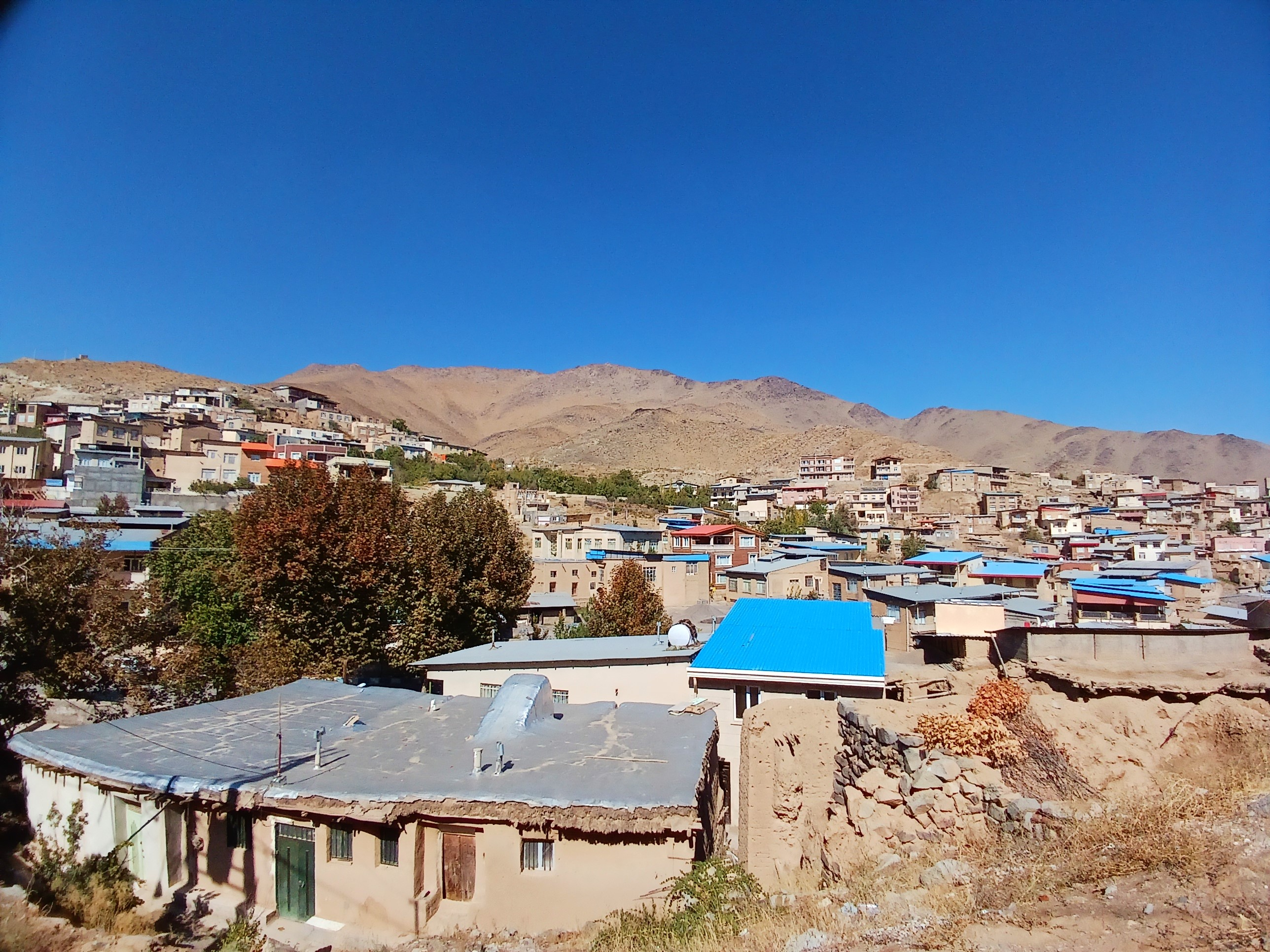
- The village of Qohrud

- Location within Iran
- Coordinates: 33°40′24″N 51°24′45″E
- Country: Iran
- Province: Isfahan
- County: Kashan
- District: Qamsar
- Rural District: Qohrud

Population (2016)
  - Total: 1,074
- Time zone: UTC+3:30 (IRST)

Qohrud (Persian: قهرود) (Note: Also romanized as Qohrūd; also known as Ghahrood, Ghahru, Ghohrood, Ghohrud, Kūhrūd, and Qahrū) is a village in, and the capital of, Qohrud Rural District in Qamsar District of Kashan County, Isfahan province, Iran.

== Demographics ==
=== Population ===
At the time of the 2006 National Census, the village's population was 657 in 246 households. The following census in 2011 counted 407 people in 162 households. The 2016 census measured the population of the village as 1,074 people in 371 households, the most populous in its rural district.
