= Tajareh, Barzok =

Village in Isfahan province, Iran

Tajareh Persian: تجره
- Village
- Location within Iran
- Coordinates: 33°40′41″N 51°02′06″E
- Country: Iran
- Province: Isfahan
- County: Kashan
- District: Barzok
- Rural District: Golab

Population (2016)
  - Total: 429
- Time zone: UTC+3:30 (IRST)

Tajareh (Persian: تجره) (Note: Also romanized as Tejrah) is a village in Golab Rural District of Barzok District in Kashan County, Isfahan province, Iran.

== Demographics ==
=== Population ===
At the time of the 2006 National Census, the village's population was 258 in 82 households. The following census in 2011 counted 249 people in 94 households. The 2016 census measured the population of the village as 429 people in 147 households.
