= Golestaneh, Kashan =

Village in Isfahan province, Iran

Golestaneh Persian: گلستانه
- Village
- Location within Iran
- Coordinates: 33°45′17″N 51°28′49″E
- Country: Iran
- Province: Isfahan
- County: Kashan
- District: Qamsar
- Rural District: Qohrud

Population (2016)
  - Total: 0
- Time zone: UTC+3:30 (IRST)

Golestaneh (Persian: گلستانه) (Note: Also romanized as Golestāneh) is a village in Qohrud Rural District of Qamsar District in Kashan County, Isfahan province, Iran.

== Demographics ==
=== Population ===
At the time of the 2006 National Census, the village's population was 17 in five households. The village did not appear in the following census of 2011. The 2016 census measured the population of the village as zero.
