= Viduj =

Village in Isfahan province, Iran

Viduj Persian: ويدوج
- Village
- Location within Iran
- Coordinates: 33°50′25″N 51°10′26″E
- Country: Iran
- Province: Isfahan
- County: Kashan
- District: Barzok
- Rural District: Golab

Population (2016)
  - Total: 1,638
- Time zone: UTC+3:30 (IRST)

Viduj (Persian: ويدوج) (Note: Also romanized as Vīdūj; also known as Vidūch) is a village in Golab Rural District of Barzok District in Kashan County, Isfahan province, Iran.

== Demographics ==
=== Population ===
At the time of the 2006 National Census, the village's population was 1,378 in 365 households. The following census in 2011 counted 1,559 people in 470 households. The 2016 census measured the population of the village as 1,638 people in 546 households, the most populous in its rural district.
