= Nasrabad, Kashan =

Village in Isfahan province, Iran

Nasrabad Persian: نصراباد
- Village
- Location within Iran
- Coordinates: 33°45′50″N 51°34′09″E
- Country: Iran
- Province: Isfahan
- County: Kashan
- District: Central
- Rural District: Khorramdasht

Population (2016)
  - Total: 132
- Time zone: UTC+3:30 (IRST)

Nasrabad (Persian: نصراباد) (Note: Also romanized as Naşrābād and Nasrābād; also known as Nasirābād, Naşrābād-e Jīrūyeh, and Naşrābād-e Jīrvīeh) is a village in Khorramdasht Rural District of the Central District in Kashan County, Isfahan province, Iran.

== Demographics ==
=== Population ===
At the time of the 2006 National Census, the village's population was 106 in 40 households. The following census in 2011 counted 94 people in 40 households. The 2016 census measured the population of the village as 132 people in 56 households.
