= Chaleh Qarah =

Village in Isfahan province, Iran

Chaleh Qarah Persian: چاله قره
- Village
- Location within Iran
- Coordinates: 33°46′35″N 51°43′43″E
- Country: Iran
- Province: Isfahan
- County: Kashan
- District: Central
- Rural District: Khorramdasht

Population (2016)
  - Total: 104
- Time zone: UTC+3:30 (IRST)

Chaleh Qarah (Persian: چاله قره) (Note: Also romanized as Chāleh Qarah; formerly known as Chaleh Qara (چاله قرا), also romanized as Chāleh Qarā; also known as Chāl Qareh) is a village in Khorramdasht Rural District of the Central District in Kashan County, Isfahan province, Iran.

== Demographics ==
=== Population ===
At the time of the 2006 National Census, the village's population, as Chaleh Qara, was 44 in 22 households. The following census in 2011 counted 76 people in 32 households, by which time the village was listed as Chaleh Qarah. The 2016 census measured the population of the village as 104 people in 37 households.
