= Kolukh-e Pain =

Village in Isfahan province, Iran

Kolukh-e Pain Persian: كلوخ پائين
- Village
- Location within Iran
- Country: Iran
- Province: Isfahan
- County: Kashan
- District: Qamsar
- Rural District: Jowshaqan-e Qali

Population (2016)
  - Total: 81
- Time zone: UTC+3:30 (IRST)

Kolukh-e Pain (Persian: كلوخ پائين) (Note: Also romanized as Kolūkh-e Pā’īn; also known as Kolūkh and Kūlūkh) is a village in Jowshaqan-e Qali Rural District of Qamsar District in Kashan County, Isfahan province, Iran.

== Demographics ==
=== Population ===
At the time of the 2006 National Census, the village's population was 37 in 14 households. The following census in 2011 counted 32 people in 14 households. The 2016 census measured the population of the village as 81 people in 28 households.
