= Dasht-e Latehor =

Village in Isfahan province, Iran

Dasht-e Latehor Persian: دشت لتحر
- Village
- Location within Iran
- Coordinates: 33°56′36″N 51°26′16″E
- Country: Iran
- Province: Isfahan
- County: Kashan
- District: Central
- Rural District: Kuhpayeh

Population (2016)
  - Total: 159
- Time zone: UTC+3:30 (IRST)

Dasht-e Latehor (Persian: دشت لتحر) (Note: Also romanized as Dasht-e Lateḩor; also known as Lateḩor and Latḩor) is a village in Kuhpayeh Rural District of the Central District in Kashan County, Isfahan province, Iran.

== Demographics ==
=== Population ===
At the time of the 2006 National Census, the village's population was 134 in 39 households. The following census in 2011 counted 215 people in 70 households. The 2016 census measured the population of the village as 159 people in 51 households.
