= Alezg =

Village in Isfahan province, Iran

Alezg Persian: الزگ
- Village
- Location within Iran
- Coordinates: 33°35′49″N 51°20′09″E
- Country: Iran
- Province: Isfahan
- County: Kashan
- District: Qamsar
- Rural District: Jowshaqan-e Qali

Population (2016)
  - Total: 248
- Time zone: UTC+3:30 (IRST)

Alezg (Persian: الزگ) (Note: Also known as Alīzq) is a village in Jowshaqan-e Qali Rural District of Qamsar District in Kashan County, Isfahan province, Iran.

== Demographics ==
=== Population ===
At the time of the 2006 National Census, the village's population was 101 in 35 households. The following census in 2011 counted 110 people in 39 households. The 2016 census measured the population of the village as 248 people in 86 households, the most populous in its rural district.
