= Qaza An =

Village in Isfahan province, Iran

Qaza An Persian: قزاان
- Village
- Location within Iran
- Coordinates: 33°42′27″N 51°23′58″E
- Country: Iran
- Province: Isfahan
- County: Kashan
- District: Qamsar
- Rural District: Qohrud

Population (2016)
  - Total: 729
- Time zone: UTC+3:30 (IRST)

Qaza An (Persian: قزاان) (Note: Also romanized as Qazā Ān and Qeza’an; also known as Kāzwān and Qaz Ān) is a village in Qohrud Rural District of Qamsar District in Kashan County, Isfahan province, Iran.

== Demographics ==
=== Population ===
At the time of the 2006 National Census, the village's population was 548 in 187 households. The following census in 2011 counted 165 people in 77 households. The 2016 census measured the population of the village as 729 people in 281 households.
