= Deh Zireh =

Village in Isfahan province, Iran

Deh Zireh Persian: ده زيره
- Village
- Location within Iran
- Coordinates: 33°44′52″N 51°44′46″E
- Country: Iran
- Province: Isfahan
- County: Kashan
- District: Central
- Rural District: Khorramdasht

Population (2016)
  - Total: 128
- Time zone: UTC+3:30 (IRST)

Deh Zireh (Persian: ده زيره) (Note: Also romanized as Deh Zīreh; also known as Deh Jīreh and Deh-e Zīr) is a village in Khorramdasht Rural District of the Central District in Kashan County, Isfahan province, Iran.

== Demographics ==
=== Population ===
At the time of the 2006 National Census, the village's population was 65 in 30 households. The following census in 2011 counted 66 people in 30 households. The 2016 census measured the population of the village as 128 people in 51 households.
