= Estark =

Village in Isfahan province, Iran

Estark Persian: استرك
- Village
- Location within Iran
- Coordinates: 34°01′16″N 51°14′15″E
- Country: Iran
- Province: Isfahan
- County: Kashan
- District: Central
- Rural District: Kuhpayeh

Population (2016)
  - Total: 1,800
- Time zone: UTC+3:30 (IRST)

Estark (Persian: استرك) (Note: Also romanized as Estarak; also known as Sirk) is a village in, and the capital of, Kuhpayeh Rural District of the Central District of Kashan County, Isfahan province, Iran.

== Demographics ==
=== Population ===
At the time of the 2006 National Census, the village's population was 1,441 in 424 households. The following census in 2011 counted 1,416 people in 451 households. The 2016 census measured the population of the village as 1,800 people in 609 households.
