= Bonabeh-ye Maraq =

Village in Isfahan province, Iran

Bonabeh-ye Maraq Persian: بنابه مرق
- Village
- Country: Iran
- Province: Isfahan
- County: Kashan
- District: Barzok
- Rural District: Babaafzal

Population (2016)
  - Total: 55
- Time zone: UTC+3:30 (IRST)

Bonabeh-ye Maraq (Persian: بنابه مرق) (Note: Also romanized as Bonābeh-e Maraq) is a village in Babaafzal Rural District (Note: Formerly Barzok Rural District) of Barzok District in Kashan County, Isfahan province, Iran.

== Demographics ==
=== Population ===
At the time of the 2006 National Census, the village's population was 38 in 12 households. The following census in 2011 counted 72 people in 18 households. The 2016 census measured the population of the village as 55 people in 22 households.
