= Ozvar =

Ozvar or Azvar or Azwar (Persian: ازوار) may refer to:

- Ozvar, Isfahan
- Ozvar, Kashan, Isfahan Province
