= Taherabad, Kashan =

Village in Isfahan province, Iran

Taherabad Persian: طاهراباد
- Village
- Location within Iran
- Coordinates: 34°02′47″N 51°20′53″E
- Country: Iran
- Province: Isfahan
- County: Kashan
- District: Central
- Rural District: Miyandasht

Population (2016)
  - Total: 2,674
- Time zone: UTC+3:30 (IRST)

Taherabad (Persian: طاهراباد) (Note: Also romanized as Ţāherābād) is a village in Miyandasht Rural District of the Central District in Kashan County, Isfahan province, Iran.

== Demographics ==
=== Population ===
At the time of the 2006 National Census, the village's population was 3,404 in 923 households. The following census in 2011 counted 3,488 people in 1,029 households. The 2016 census measured the population of the village as 2,674 people in 1,083 households, the most populous in its rural district.
