= Sen Sen =

Village in Isfahan province, Iran

Sen Sen Persian: سن سن
- Village
- Location within Iran
- Coordinates: 34°14′59″N 51°16′24″E
- Country: Iran
- Province: Isfahan
- County: Kashan
- District: Central
- Rural District: Miyandasht

Population (2016)
  - Total: 1,690
- Time zone: UTC+3:30 (IRST)

Sen Sen (Persian: سن سن) (Note: Also romanized as Sansen; also known as Sinsin) is a village in Miyandasht Rural District of the Central District in Kashan County, Isfahan province, Iran.

== Demographics ==
=== Population ===
At the time of the 2006 National Census, the village's population was 1,576 in 411 households. The following census in 2011 counted 1,647 people in 479 households. The 2016 census measured the population of the village as 1,690 people in 543 households.
