= Javinan =

Village in Isfahan province, Iran

Javinan Persian: جوينان
- Village
- Location within Iran
- Coordinates: 33°40′54″N 51°25′55″E
- Country: Iran
- Province: Isfahan
- County: Kashan
- District: Qamsar
- Rural District: Qohrud

Population (2016)
  - Total: 406
- Time zone: UTC+3:30 (IRST)

Javinan (Persian: جوينان) (Note: Also romanized as Javīnān and Jovīnān; also known as Jebinūn and Jovītān) is a village in Qohrud Rural District of Qamsar District in Kashan County, Isfahan province, Iran.

== Demographics ==
=== Population ===
At the time of the 2006 National Census, the village's population was 215 in 81 households. The following census in 2011 counted 256 people in 96 households. The 2016 census measured the population of the village as 406 people in 144 households.
