= Sadian-e Maraq =

Village in Isfahan province, Iran

Sadian-e Maraq Persian: ساديان مرق
- Village
- Location within Iran
- Country: Iran
- Province: Isfahan
- County: Kashan
- District: Barzok
- Rural District: Babaafzal

Population (2016)
  - Total: 567
- Time zone: UTC+3:30 (IRST)

Sadian-e Maraq (Persian: ساديان مرق) (Note: Also romanized as Sādīān-e Maraq; also known as Bīdīān, Sādīān, and Sādīyān) is a village in Babaafzal Rural District (Note: Formerly Barzok Rural District) of Barzok District in Kashan County, Isfahan province, Iran.

== Demographics ==
=== Population ===
At the time of the 2006 National Census, the village's population was 450 in 123 households. The following census in 2011 counted 316 people in 93 households. The 2016 census measured the population of the village as 567 people in 201 households.
