= Jezeh, Kashan =

Village in Isfahan province, Iran

Jezeh Persian: جزه
- Village
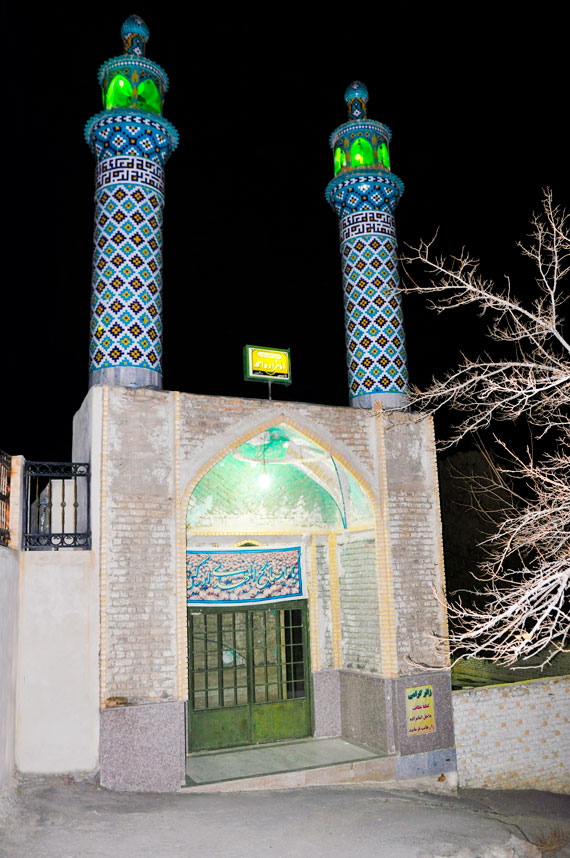
- Emamzadeh Ahmad in the village of Jezeh

- Location within Iran
- Coordinates: 33°51′08″N 51°23′27″E
- Country: Iran
- Province: Isfahan
- County: Kashan
- District: Central
- Rural District: Kuhpayeh

Population (2016)
  - Total: 368
- Time zone: UTC+3:30 (IRST)

Jezeh (Persian: جزه) (Note: Also romanized as Jazeh; also known as Gazeh) is a village in Kuhpayeh Rural District of the Central District in Kashan County, Isfahan province, Iran.

== Demographics ==
=== Population ===
At the time of the 2006 National Census, the village's population was 288 in 83 households. The following census in 2011 counted 270 people in 77 households. The 2016 census measured the population of the village as 368 people in 111 households.
