= Joshekan province =

Josheqan (Persian: جوشقان, romanized: Jūsheqān) was a small province of Qajar Iran, covering about 1,000 sq mi (2,600 km^{2}).

Under the Safavids, the region was called Meimeh, and the tax collector resided in the large village of Josheqan Qali. Under the Qajar dynasty, the province of Josheqan was created as a fiefdom for Bahram Mirza Moezz-od-Dowleh Qajar. Upon his death in 1882 it passed to his son Ism'ail Mirza Moezz-od-Dowleh. It was later incorporated into Isfahan province of modern Iran.

Josheqan took its name from the village of Josheqan Qali, once known for its wool production and carpet-making. The word qali (قالی) from its name means carpet. Later, the governor's residence was moved to Meimeh, a smaller city situated at an elevation of 6670 ft. Meimeh is located about 63 mi (101 km) north-west of Isfahan, and roughly equidistant from Gulpaigan and Natanz.
