= Shadian, Isfahan =

Village in Isfahan province, Iran

Shadian Persian: شاديان
- Village
- Location within Iran
- Coordinates: 33°51′21″N 51°36′14″E
- Country: Iran
- Province: Isfahan
- County: Kashan
- District: Central
- Rural District: Khorramdasht

Population (2016)
  - Total: 203
- Time zone: UTC+3:30 (IRST)

Shadian (Persian: شاديان) (Note: Also romanized as Shādeyān, Shādīān, and Shādīyān; also known as Shāh Dahān and Shāh Dehān) is a village in Khorramdasht Rural District of the Central District in Kashan County, Isfahan province, Iran.

== Demographics ==
=== Population ===
At the time of the 2006 National Census, the village's population was 106 in 39 households. The following census in 2011 counted 127 people in 46 households. The 2016 census measured the population of the village as 203 people in 61 households.
