= Golabgiri =

Annual ceremony in Iran

Golabgiri (Persian, "making rosewater") is a festival taking place annually from mid-May to mid-June in Kashan, Isfahan Province, Iran. The ceremony takes place throughout Kashan county, majorly in Ghamsar, Niasar; and in surrounding regions. This period marks the full bloom of the rose, transforming the hot desert region into a magnificent space of flowers. During this event that annually attracts tens of thousands to two million tourists, the essence of the national flower, Rosa damascena, 'Damask Rose'—locally called Mohammadi Rose—planted in many flower gardens in these areas, is prepared by the traditional method of an evaporation system.

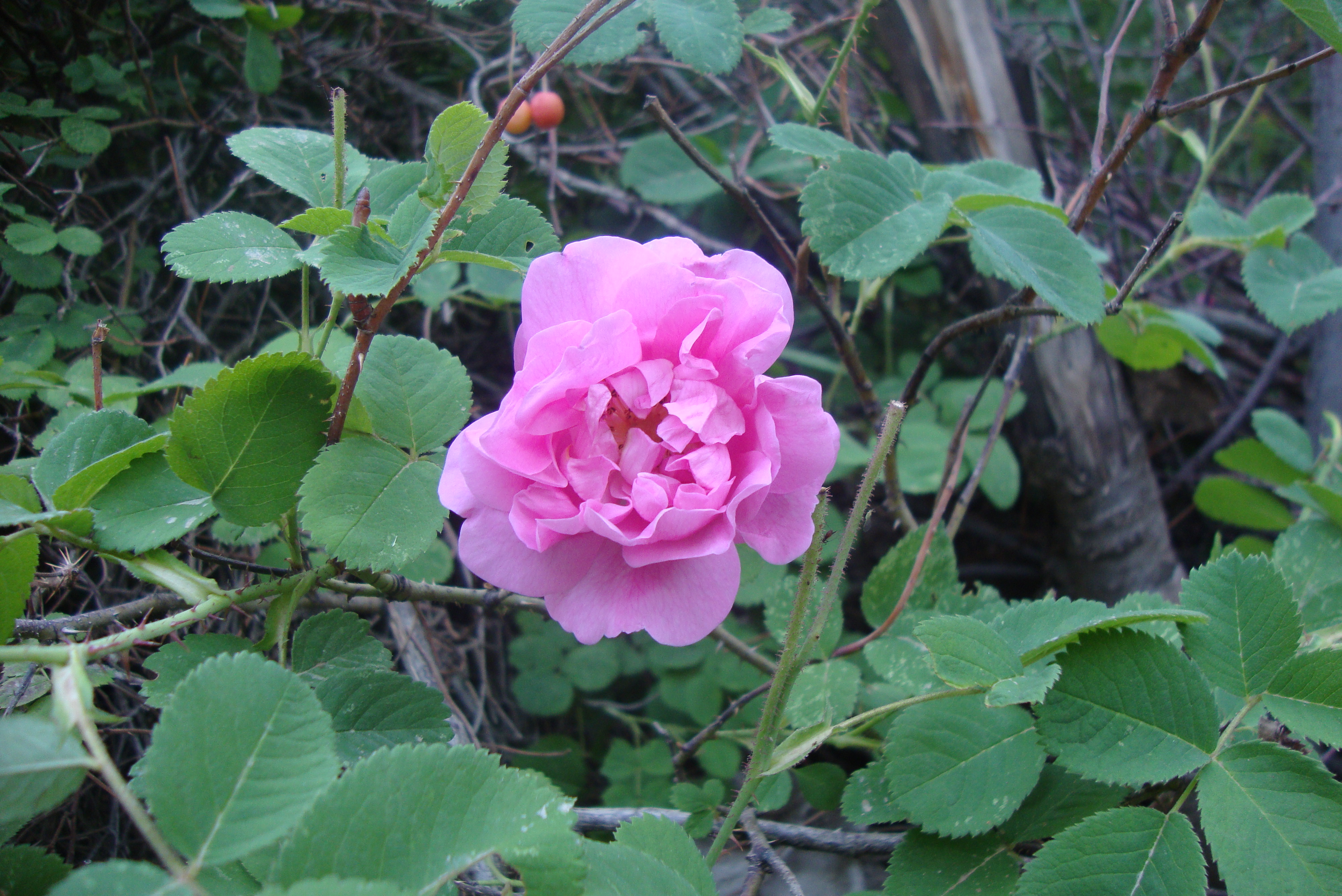
Gole Muhammadi (Rose flower)

== Background ==
Roses have been grown in Iran since at least the 10th century. Today, the country is the world's first producer of rose water (golab), with 22,000 tonnes produced mainly in the central and southern regions. The Damask Rose produces the highest quality golab, and therefore 15,000 hectares are solely devoted to growing it. Due to its wide range of uses in essential oils, body products, various foods and desserts, and for religious purposes, it is a profitable crop and nearly 80% of the farmers in the region are dependent on golab-related sales.

In the 16th century, Kashan became a major hub for rose water distilleries, whose products were exported to nearby countries such as Bulgaria and Turkey. The golabgiri festival is held here in honor of it retaining the oldest and most traditional methods of rose water distillation: many other cities have adopted modern machinery to speed up processes. The festival itself is around 1,000 years old.

== Events ==
The festival is free to attend, and tours include viewing distilleries or the rose fields, where tourists are encouraged to participate in the harvests. Celebrations will commonly hold at cultural centers and include traditional rosewater extraction ceremonies, exhibitions showcasing the specialties of different provinces and the handicrafts of ethnic groups, various cultural and artistic programs, and live performances of Iranian ethnic music.

The families usually pick the flowers before sunrise, due to the belief that harvests early in the day yield stronger-scented flowers. Picking is usually completed by noon.

Gol-Ghaltan (rolling in flowers) is an ancient tradition where grandmothers bathe infants and place them on a rose-filled white cloth. Care is taken to remove all thorns and leaves. The baby is then dried and bathed again in the petals. The ritual is believed to protect babies from illness and sad feelings.

== Distillation Process ==
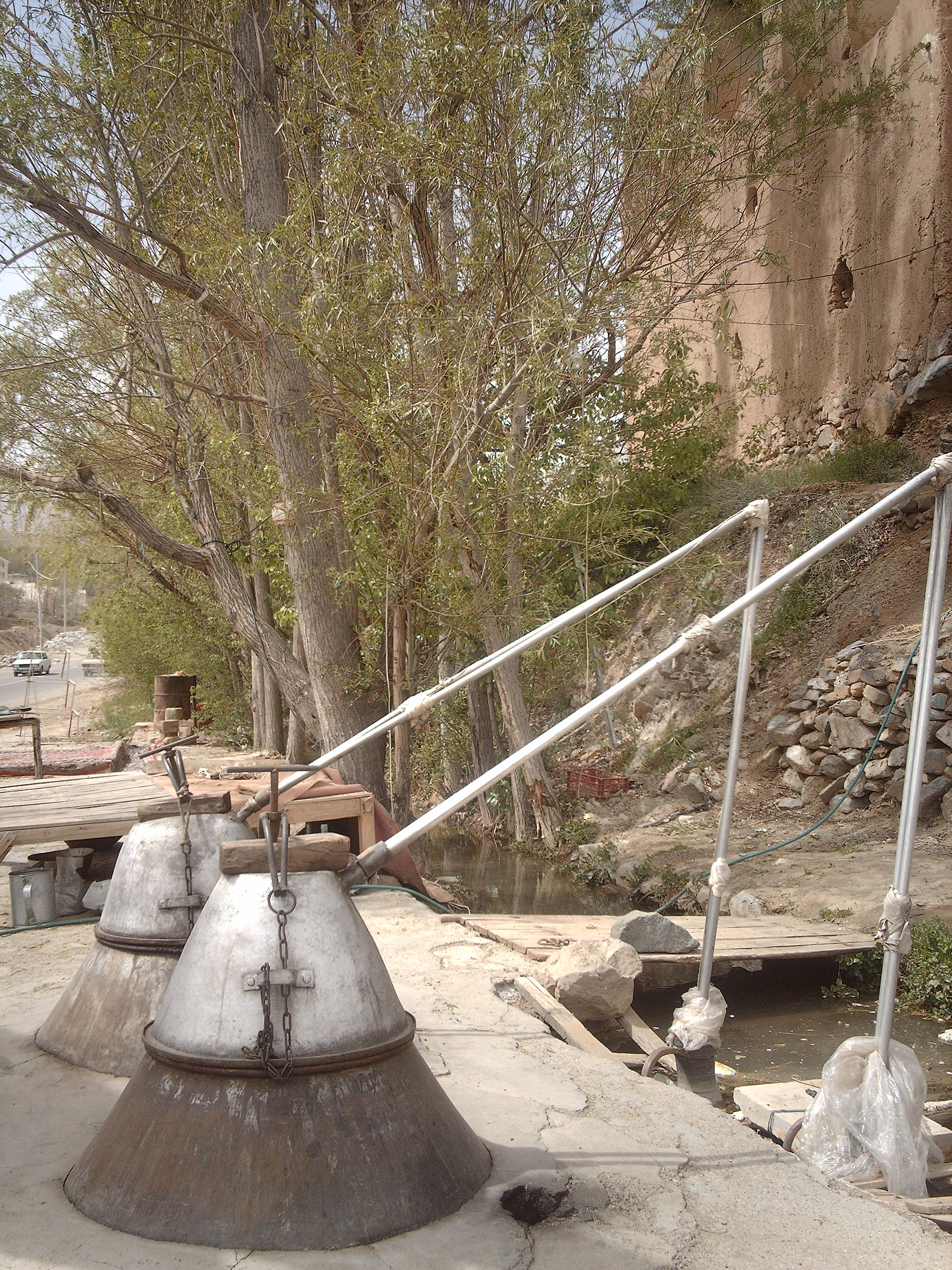
Evaporation pot

30 kilograms of petals are placed in a large copper vessel known as a dig, which is filled with water. Once it is sealed, the water is heated, causing the steam to rise and pass through the flowers. More water is added at varying times depending on the planned grade of golab. The steam carries the essential oils and fragrances, which are then collected in a cooling coil. The distillation process typically takes several hours, with four being the recommended minimum. The resulting golab is collected in large containers for bottling. This time-consuming method is prized for the high-quality rose water produced.

Depending on the purity of the rose water, it is graded into several categories: heavy rosewater (first grade), light rose (second grade), “doatashe” (double fire rosewater), “sehatashe” (three fire rosewater), and sub-aromatic rose.
