= Natanzi =

Natanzi may be,

- Natanzi language, Iran
- Morteza Saffari Natanzi
