= Asadabad-e Bala, Isfahan =

Village in Isfahan province, Iran

Asadabad-e Bala Persian: اسدابادبالا
- Village
- Country: Iran
- Province: Isfahan
- County: Kashan
- District: Central
- Rural District: Khorramdasht

Population (2016)
  - Total: 112
- Time zone: UTC+3:30 (IRST)

Asadabad-e Bala (Persian: اسدابادبالا) (Note: Also romanized as Asadābād-e Bālā) is a village in Khorramdasht Rural District of the Central District in Kashan County, Isfahan province, Iran.

== Demographics ==
=== Population ===
At the time of the 2006 National Census, the village's population was 18 in eight households. The following census in 2011 counted eight people in five households. The 2016 census measured the population of the village as 112 people in 37 households.
