= Asadabad-e Bala =

Asadabad-e Bala (Persian: اسدابادبالا) may refer to:

- Asadabad-e Bala, Isfahan
- Asadabad-e Bala, Yazd
