= Ozvar, Kashan =

Village in Isfahan province, Iran

Ozvar Persian: ازوار
- Village
- Location within Iran
- Coordinates: 33°48′59″N 51°09′11″E
- Country: Iran
- Province: Isfahan
- County: Kashan
- District: Barzok
- Rural District: Golab

Population (2016)
  - Total: 1,553
- Time zone: UTC+3:30 (IRST)

Ozvar (Persian: ازوار) (Note: Also romanized as Azvār, Azwār, and Ozvār; also known as Owzvār) is a village in, and the capital of, Golab Rural District in Barzok District of Kashan County, Isfahan province, Iran.

== Demographics ==
=== Population ===
At the time of the 2006 National Census, the village's population was 727 in 216 households. The following census in 2011 counted 1,024 people in 299 households. The 2016 census measured the population of the village as 1,553 people in 488 households.
