= Pendas =

Pendas may refer to:

- Pendas, Iran
- Pendas, Malaysia
