= Pendas, Iran =

Village in Isfahan province, Iran

Pendas Persian: پنداس
- Village
- Location within Iran
- Coordinates: 33°41′08″N 51°03′30″E
- Country: Iran
- Province: Isfahan
- County: Kashan
- District: Barzok
- Rural District: Golab

Population (2016)
  - Total: 248
- Time zone: UTC+3:30 (IRST)

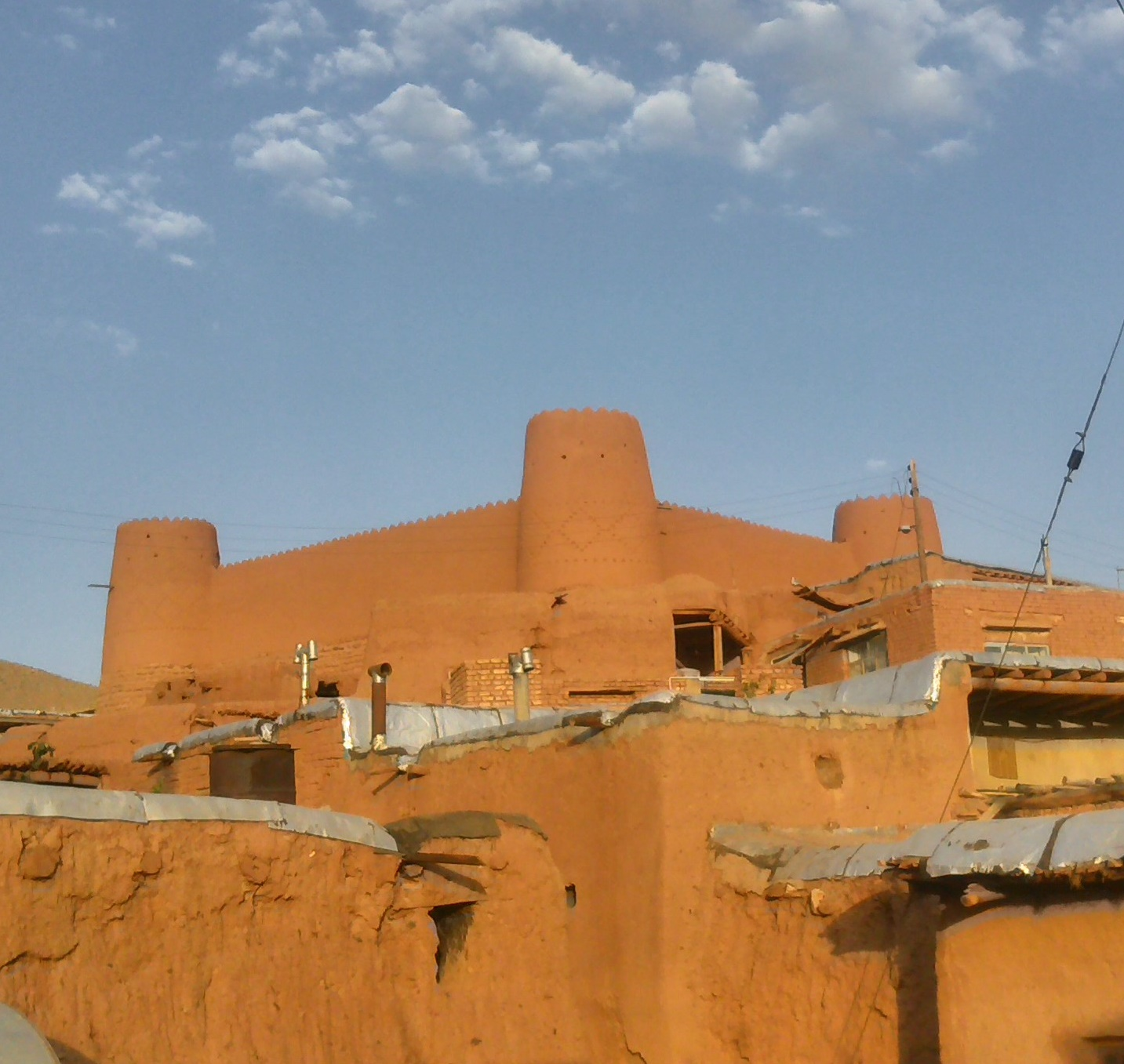

Pendas (Persian: پنداس) (Note: Also romanized as Pandās and Pendās; also known as Phandas) is a village in Golab Rural District of Barzok District in Kashan County, Isfahan province, Iran.

== Demographics ==
=== Population ===
At the time of the 2006 National Census, the village's population was 134 in 53 households. The following census in 2011 counted 136 people in 60 households. The 2016 census measured the population of the village as 248 people in 96 households.
