= Jowsheqan-e Estark =

Village in Isfahan province, Iran

Jowsheqan-e Estark Persian: جوشقان استرك
- Village
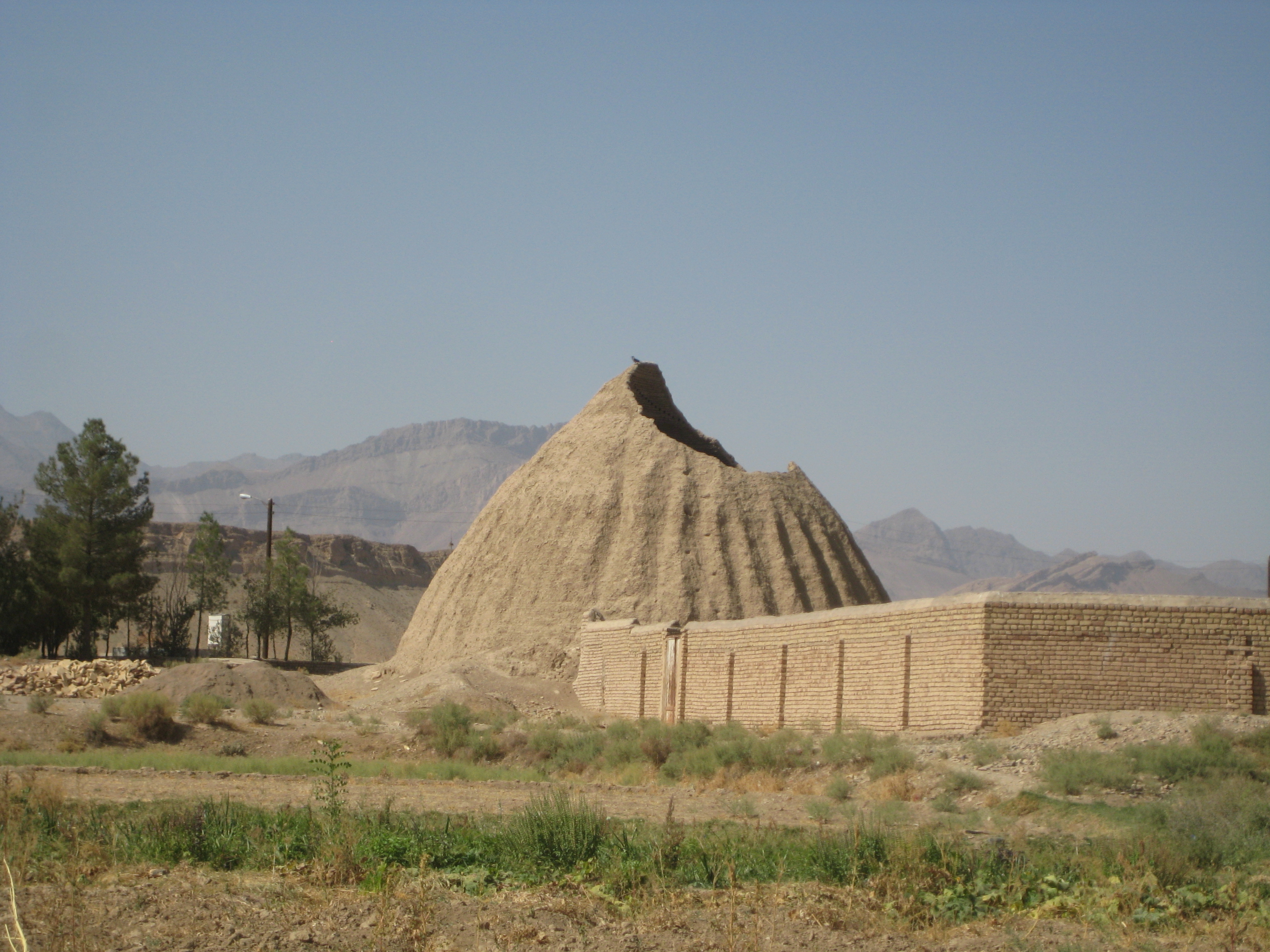
- The village of Jowsheqan-e Estark

- Location within Iran
- Coordinates: 34°02′44″N 51°13′22″E
- Country: Iran
- Province: Isfahan
- County: Kashan
- District: Central
- Rural District: Kuhpayeh

Population (2016)
  - Total: 2,035
- Time zone: UTC+3:30 (IRST)

Jowsheqan-e Estark (Persian: جوشقان استرك) (Note: Also romanized as Jooshqan Estarak, Jowsheqān Estark, Jūsheqān Estark, Jūsheqān-e Estarak, Jusheqan-e Estark, and Jūsheqān-e Estark; also known as Jūsheqān and Jūshqān) is a village in Kuhpayeh Rural District of the Central District in Kashan County, Isfahan province, Iran.

== Demographics ==
=== Population ===
At the time of the 2006 National Census, the village's population was 1,952 in 523 households. The following census in 2011 counted 2,037 people in 592 households. The 2016 census measured the population of the village as 2,035 people in 677 households. It was the most populous village in its rural district.
