= Khorramdasht, Kashan =

Village in Isfahan province, Iran

Khorramdasht Persian: خرمدشت
- Village
- Location within Iran
- Coordinates: 33°51′05″N 51°34′45″E
- Country: Iran
- Province: Isfahan
- County: Kashan
- District: Central
- Rural District: Khorramdasht

Population (2016)
  - Total: 267
- Time zone: UTC+3:30 (IRST)

Khorramdasht (Persian: خرمدشت) (Note: Also known as Karīm Dasht, Khorram Dasht and Khurram Dasht) is a village in, and the capital of, Khorramdasht Rural District in the Central District of Kashan County, Isfahan province, Iran.

== Demographics ==
=== Population ===
At the time of the 2006 National Census, the village's population was 41 in 21 households. The following census in 2011 counted 143 people in 52 households. The 2016 census measured the population of the village as 267 people in 94 households, the most populous in its rural district.
