= Barzak =

Barzak may refer to:

- Christopher Barzak (b. 1975), American author
- Barzok, a city in Iran
