= Kuhpayeh Rural District (Kashan County) =

Rural district in Isfahan province, Iran

Kuhpayeh Rural District Persian: دهستان كوهپايه
- Rural District
- Location within Iran
- Coordinates: 33°57′N 51°21′E
- Country: Iran
- Province: Isfahan
- County: Kashan
- District: Central
- Established: 1987
- Capital: Estark

Population (2016)
  - Total: 2,035
- Time zone: UTC+3:30 (IRST)

Kuhpayeh Rural District (Persian: دهستان كوهپايه) is in the Central District of Kashan County, Isfahan province, Iran. Its capital is the village of Estark.

== Demographics ==
=== Population ===
At the time of the 2006 National Census, the rural district's population was 5,074 in 1,417 households. There were 5,284 inhabitants in 1,535 households at the following census of 2011. The 2016 census measured the population of the rural district as 6,317 in 1,997 households. The most populous of its 30 villages was Jowsheqan-e Estark, with 2,035 people.

=== Other villages in the rural district ===
- Ab-e Sefidab
- Darreh
- Dasht-e Latehor
- Jezeh
- Khonb
- Yazdabad
