= Khorram Dasht Rural District =

Khorram Dasht Rural District (Persian: دهستان خرم دشت) may refer to:

- Khorram Dasht Rural District (Hamadan Province)
- Khorram Dasht Rural District (Kashan County), in Isfahan
- Khorramdasht Rural District (Kuhbanan County), in Kerman
- Khorram Dasht Rural District (Markazi Province)
