= Rosewater sprinkler =

Type of perfurming sprinkler

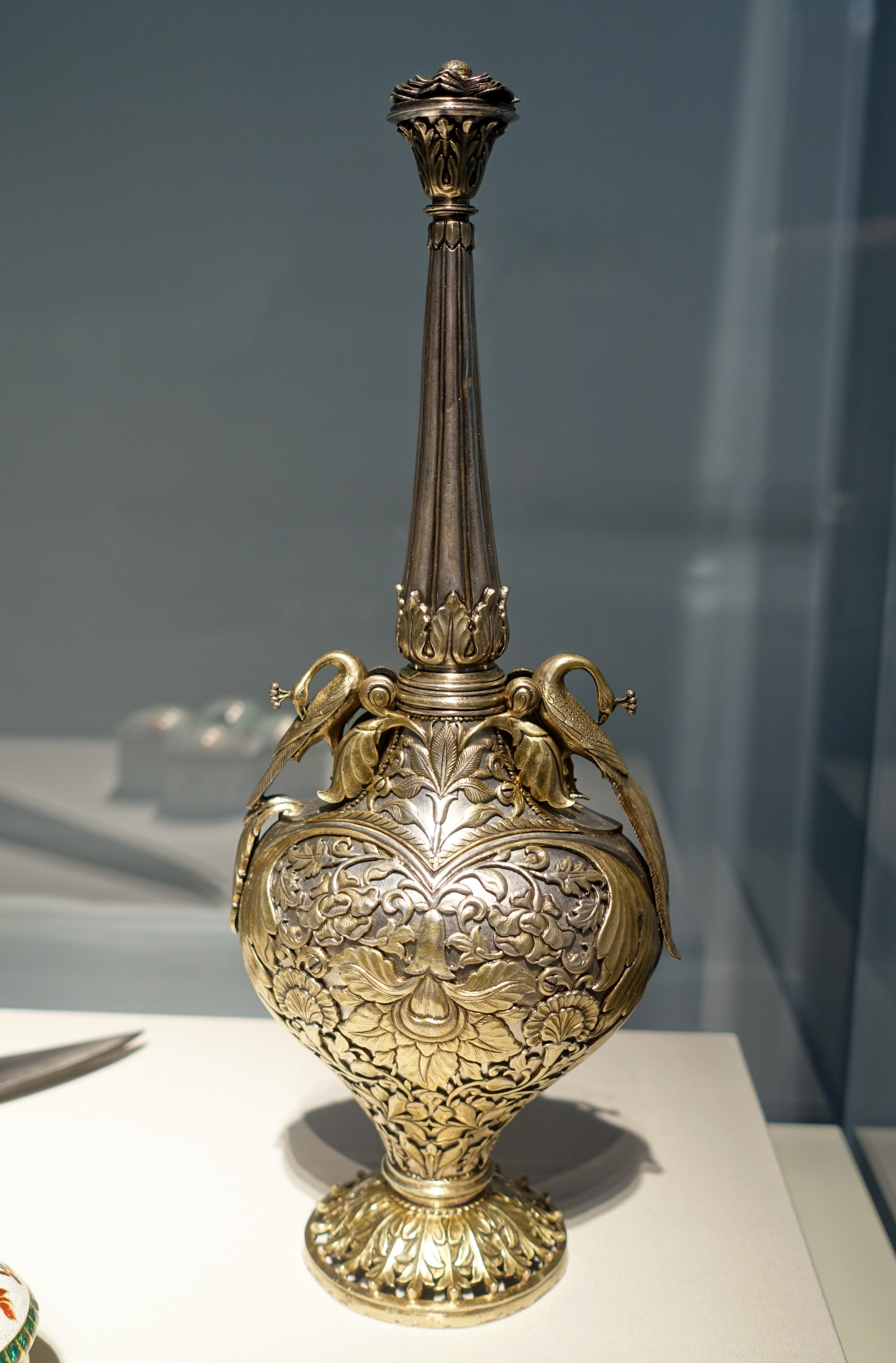
Rosewater sprinkler, made in Lucknow, Awadh, north India. c. 1775–1800. This lavish example was made of silver and is in the Mughal style

A rosewater sprinkler (Persian: gulab pash) is a vessel used to ceremonially sprinkle rosewater on guests, in order to perfume them. Of Persian origin, rosewater sprinklers spread to the Eastern Mediterranean region, Central Asia, the Maghreb, and India. In India, rosewater sprinklers were used by Mughal rulers and became part of elaborate durbar ceremonies to welcome guests or to signal that the audience would end shortly. Rosewater sprinklers were made out of a variety of materials including ceramic, metal (especially silver or silver-gilt), or glass.

The basic form of a rosewater sprinkler is that of a reservoir or main body, which is filled with rosewater and is covered by a long spout that can be unscrewed to fill the reservoir. Beyond this shape, if made of metal, they could be intricately, cast, chased, or carved with decorative motifs.

Rosewater sprinklers are first known to have been introduced in the Levant in the 11th and 12th centuries. In the 16th century, the Mughals are known to have used rosewater in cooking, but they also sprinkled rosewater. The Emperor Jahangir, in the Jahangirnama, mentions a festival of sprinkling rosewater called gulab-pashi, or rosewater sprinkling. When Nadir Shah looted the Mughal treasury in Delhi in 1739, among his trophies were a pair of rosewater sprinklers encrusted in gold and gems, today in the Hermitage Museum in Russia.

Often associated with Islamic rulers, rosewater sprinklers were also used by Hindus and Christians. In the Ottoman Empire, the Kutahya pottery, which in the 18th and 19th century consisted mostly of Armenian potters, produced rosewater sprinklers. Blue-and-white porcelain rosewater sprinklers from Qing Dynasty China, made for export to Islamic lands are known to exist.

Kangxi era(1662-1722) Qing Dynasty rosewater sprinkler

Kutahya rosewater sprinkler

Ottoman rosewater sprinkler, 18th century.
