= Miyandasht Rural District (Kashan County) =

Rural district in Isfahan province, Iran

Miyandasht Rural District Persian: دهستان مياندشت
- Rural District
- Location within Iran
- Coordinates: 34°14′N 51°11′E
- Country: Iran
- Province: Isfahan
- County: Kashan
- District: Central
- Established: 1987
- Capital: Meshkat

Population (2016)
  - Total: 6,898
- Time zone: UTC+3:30 (IRST)

Miyandasht Rural District (Persian: دهستان مياندشت) is in the Central District of Kashan County, Isfahan province, Iran. It is administered from the city of Meshkat.

== Demographics ==
=== Population ===
At the time of the 2006 National Census, the rural district's population was 7,372 in 1,965 households. There were 7,662 inhabitants in 2,270 households at the following census of 2011. The 2016 census measured the population of the rural district as 6,898 in 2,411 households. The most populous of its 41 villages was Taherabad, with 2,674 people.

=== Other villages in the rural district ===
- Ab Shirin
- Khozaq
- Sen Sen
- Yahyaabad-e Bala
