= Barzok =

City in Isfahan province, Iran

Barzok Persian: برزک
- City
- Location within Iran
- Coordinates: 33°46′55″N 51°13′33″E
- Country: Iran
- Province: Isfahan
- County: Kashan
- District: Barzok
- Established as a city: 2003

Population (2016)
  - Total: 4,588
- Time zone: UTC+3:30 (IRST)

Barzok (Persian: برزک) (Note: Also romanized as Barzak; also known as Barzūk) is a city in, and the capital of, Barzok District in Kashan County, Isfahan province, Iran. As a village, it was the capital of Barzok Rural District (Note: Renamed Babaafzal Rural District) until its capital was transferred to the village of Maraq. Barzok was converted to a city in 2003. Rose water is produced in the city.

== Demographics ==
=== Population ===
At the time of the 2006 National Census, the city's population was 3,211 in 936 households. The following census in 2011 counted 3,265 people in 1,026 households. The 2016 census measured the population of the city as 4,588 people in 1,498 households.
