= Meshkat =

City in Isfahan province, Iran

Meshkat Persian: مشكات
- City
- Location within Iran
- Coordinates: 34°10′43″N 51°15′51″E
- Country: Iran
- Province: Isfahan
- County: Kashan
- District: Central
- Established as a city: 2005

Population (2016)
  - Total: 5,357
- Time zone: UTC+3:30 (IRST)
- Website: www.meshkatcity.ir

Meshkat (Persian: مَشكات) (Note: Also romanized as Mashkat (pronounced /maʃ'ka:t/); formerly known as Mashgān or Meshgān (مشگان); also known as Mashkān and Moshkān) is a city in the Central District of Kashan County, Isfahan province, Iran, serving as the administrative center for Miyandasht Rural District. The village of Meshgan (مشگان), after merging with the village of Mahmudabad (محمودآباد), was converted to a city and renamed Meshkat.

== Demographics ==
=== Population ===
At the time of the 2006 National Census, the city's population was 4,960 in 1,299 households. The following census in 2011 counted 4,869 people in 1,414 households. The 2016 census measured the population of the city as 5,357 people in 1,687 households.

== Overview ==
Mashkat is the northernmost town in Esfahan Province, Iran. It has a population of 5,357, in 2016). It is situated between Qom-Kashan Highway (named Amir Kabir Highway) on the South and Qom-Kashan International road on the north; these two main roads connect the north of the country to its south. It is situated in km 25 Kashan-Qom road. Also, it is 195 km (121 mi) south of Tehran, and 250 km (160 mi) north of Esfahan. Mashkatis 880–910 m (2,890–2,990 ft) above sea level.

It has a semi-warm climate. The people of this town are mainly farmers, factory workers or craftsmen. The most important agricultural products of Mashkat include wheat, pomegranate, greengage, cotton, among others. It is endowed with several brooks some of which are flowing all year long. Trees of various types help moderate the temperature in hot season; when passing by the thick vegetation areas beside the main road to mashkat, one could easily feel the considerable drop of temperature.

Recently, a calcium bicarbonate factory has been built near this town, promising prosperous economic future for the town.

Mashkat is southerly limited to the Tehran-Ghom-Esfahan Expressway, while the main asphalt road, which connects Tehran to the south of the country, passes directly through this town. Also, a railroad passes by the northern side of the Mashkat's suburbs.
