= Qamsar =

City in Isfahan province, Iran

Qamsar Persian: قمصر
- City
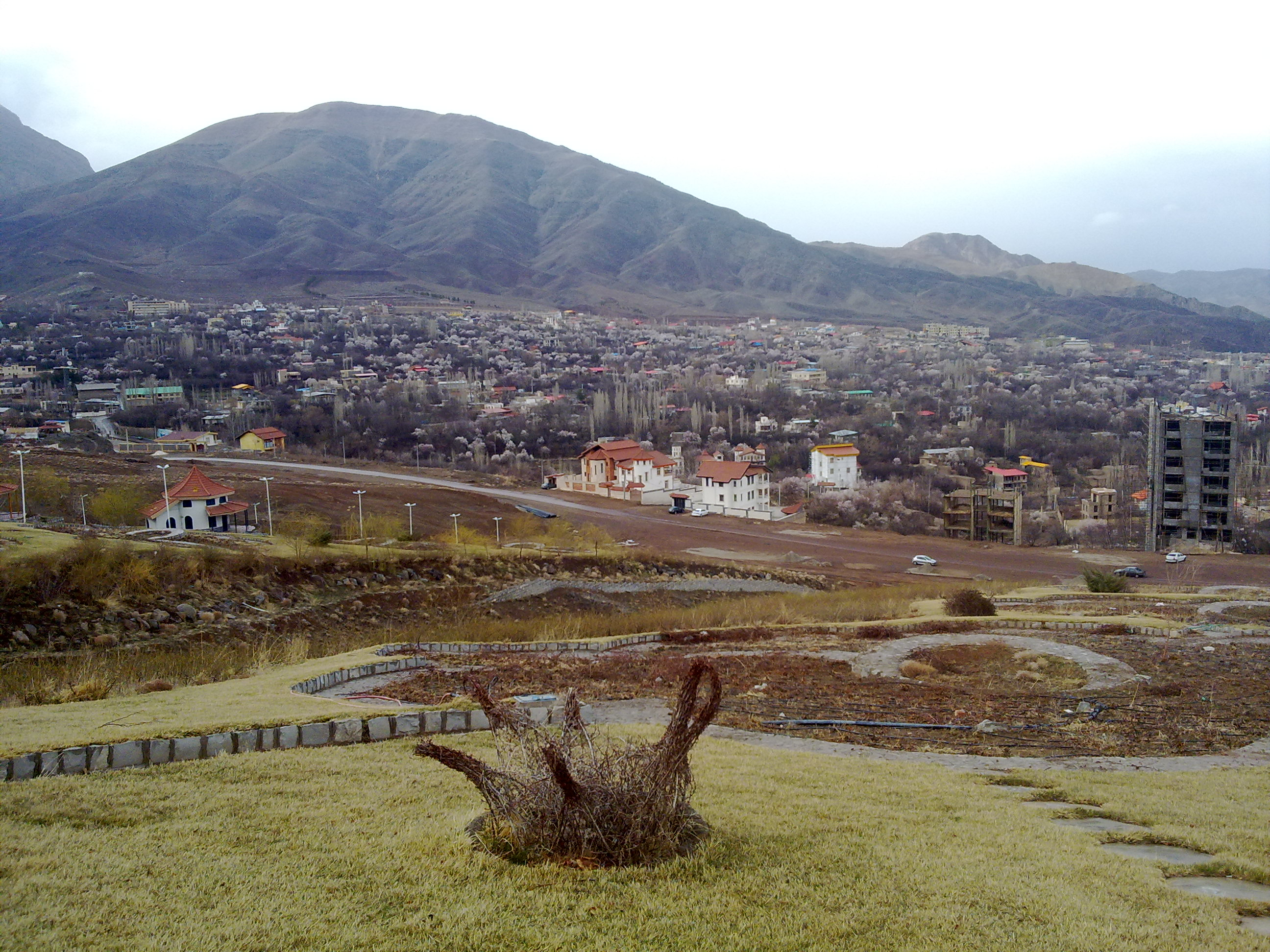
- The city of Qamsar

- Location within Iran
- Coordinates: 33°45′05″N 51°25′57″E
- Country: Iran
- Province: Isfahan
- County: Kashan
- District: Qamsar

Population (2016)
  - Total: 3,877
- Time zone: UTC+3:30 (IRST)

Qamsar (Persian: قمصر) (Note: Also romanized as Qamşar; also known as Ghamsar and Kamsār) is a city in, and the capital of, Qamsar District in Kashan County, Isfahan province, Iran. The district is 15 km south of Kashan.

== History ==
From the 13th century and possibly considerably earlier, cobalt was mined near Qamsar. The metal oxide was exported all over the Muslim world for use as the cobalt blue pigment in the decoration of pottery. It is possible that the cobalt ore was also exported to China. In 1301 Abū'l-Qāsim, who came from a family of tilemakers based in Kashan, wrote a treatise on the manufacture of fritware ceramics in which he mentions the village as a source of cobalt ore.

Albert Houtum-Schindler visited the village at the end of the 19th century when Qamsar was "a large and flourishing village of about three hundred houses with extensive gardens with fine roses used for the manufacture of rosewater." He described the processing and marketing of the cobalt-containing ore.

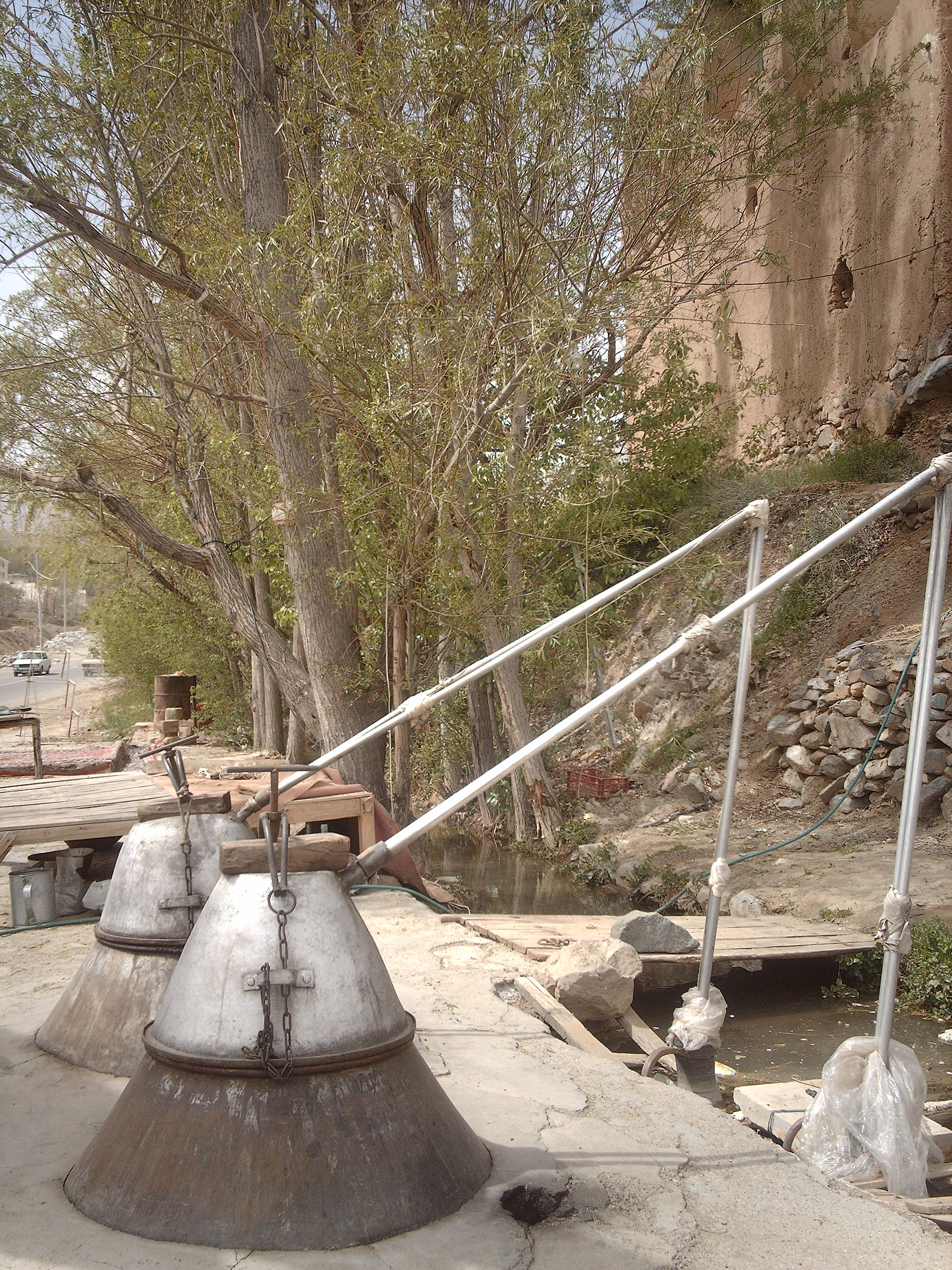
Vessels used for the preparation of rose water

Ghamsar is host to one of the biggest festivals of Iran called Golabgiri to celebrate the production of rose water in spring.

== Demographics ==
=== Population ===
At the time of the 2006 National Census, the city's population was 3,566 in 1,048 households. The following census in 2011 counted 3,410 people in 1,066 households. The 2016 census measured the population of the city as 3,877 people in 1,271 households.

There is also a sizeable Baha'i part of thepopulation.
