= Babaafzal Rural District =

Rural district in Isfahan province, Iran

Babaafzal Rural District Persian: دهستان باباافضل
- Rural District
- Location within Iran
- Coordinates: 33°50′N 51°14′E
- Country: Iran
- Province: Isfahan
- County: Kashan
- District: Barzok
- Established: 1987
- Capital: Maraq

Population (2016)
  - Total: 2,393
- Time zone: UTC+3:30 (IRST)

Babaafzal Rural District (Persian: دهستان باباافضل), (Note: Formerly Barzok Rural District (دهستان برزک)) is in Barzok District of Kashan County, Isfahan province, Iran. Its capital is the village of Maraq. The previous capital of the rural district was the village of Barzok, now a city.

== Demographics ==
=== Population ===
At the time of the 2006 National Census, the rural district's population was 1,904 in 596 households. There were 1,879 inhabitants in 545 households at the following census of 2011. The 2016 census measured the population of the rural district as 2,393 in 822 households. The most populous of its eight villages was Maraq, with 1,646 people.

=== Other villages in the rural district ===
- Bonabeh-ye Maraq
- Nabar
- Sadian-e Maraq
