= Kamu va Chugan =

City in Isfahan province, Iran

Kamu va Chugan Persian: کامو و چوگان
- City
- Location within Iran
- Coordinates: 33°37′14″N 51°15′59″E
- Country: Iran
- Province: Isfahan
- County: Kashan
- District: Qamsar
- Established as a city: 2014

Population (2016)
  - Total: 2,434
- Time zone: UTC+3:30 (IRST)

Kamu va Chugan (Persian: کامو و چوگان) is a city in Qamsar District of Kashan County, Isfahan province, Iran.

== History ==
In 2000, four villages merged to form the new city of Jowsheqan va Kamu: Chugan (چوگان), Jowsheqan (جوشقان), (Note: Also romanized as Jowsheqān; also known as Jowshaqān-e Qālī (جوشقان قالی), Jowsheqān-e-Qālī, and Jūshqān Qāli) Kamu (کامو), (Note: Also romanized as Kāmū; also known as Qamu) and Vahdatabad (وحدت آباد).

In 2014, the city split into two cities, Jowshaqan-e Qali and Kamu va Chugan.

== Demographics ==
=== Population ===
At the time of the 2016 National Census, the city's population was 2,434 people in 899 households.
