= Golab Rural District =

Rural district in Isfahan province, Iran

Golab Rural District Persian: دهستان گلاب
- Rural District
- Location within Iran
- Coordinates: 33°46′N 51°09′E
- Country: Iran
- Province: Isfahan
- County: Kashan
- District: Barzok
- Established: 2001
- Capital: Ozvar

Population (2016)
  - Total: 7,929
- Time zone: UTC+3:30 (IRST)

Golab Rural District (Persian: دهستان گلاب) is in Barzok District of Kashan County, Isfahan province, Iran. Its capital is the village of Ozvar.

== Demographics ==
=== Population ===
At the time of the 2006 National Census, the rural district's population was 5,152 in 1,533 households. There were 6,071 inhabitants in 1,933 households at the following census of 2011. The 2016 census measured the population of the rural district as 7,929 in 2,671 households. The most populous of its 18 villages was Viduj, with 1,638 people.

=== Other villages in the rural district ===
- Arenjan
- Azaran
- Pendas
- Tajareh
- Varkan
- Viduja
