= Qohrud Rural District =

Rural district in Isfahan province, Iran

Qohrud Rural District Persian: دهستان قهرود
- Rural District
- Location within Iran
- Coordinates: 33°44′N 51°25′E
- Country: Iran
- Province: Isfahan
- County: Kashan
- District: Qamsar
- Established: 1993
- Capital: Qohrud

Population (2016)
  - Total: 2,426
- Time zone: UTC+3:30 (IRST)

Qohrud Rural District (Persian: دهستان قهرود) is in Qamsar District of Kashan County, Isfahan province, Iran. Its capital is the village of Qohrud.

== Demographics ==
=== Population ===
At the time of the 2006 National Census, the rural district's population was 1,627 in 581 households. There were 904 inhabitants in 364 households at the following census of 2011. The 2016 census measured the population of the rural district as 2,426 in 870 households. The most populous of its 12 villages was Qohrud, with 1,074 people.

=== Other villages in the rural district ===
- Golestaneh
- Hoseynabad
- Javinan
- Moslemabad
- Qaza An
