= Morteza Saffari Natanzi =

Iranian diplomat and politician (1956–2019)

- مرتضی صفاری نطنزی

Member of the Parliament of Iran
- In office 28 May 2016 – 26 June 2019
- Constituency: Natanz and Qamsar
- Majority: 46٫40٪ ] (25.44%)

Personal details
- Born: 27 April 1956 Natanz, Iran
- Died: 26 June 2019 (aged 63) Tehran, Iran
- Party: Independent
- Education: Bucharest Academy of Economic Studies
- Profession: Diplomat

Morteza Saffari Natanzi (Persian: مرتضی صفاری نطنزی, (27 April 1956 in Natanz – 26 June 2019) was an Iranian diplomat and politician who was representative of Natanz and Qamsar in the Parliament of Iran. He was a member of National Security and Foreign Policy Commission.

== Career ==
Having a B.Sc. in insurance management, he joined the Iranian Ministry of Foreign Affairs in 1981. He then served as Iranian Chargé d'affaires in Romania when he also completed a M.Sc. and a Ph.D. in economics at Bucharest Academy of Economic Studies. In the next 30 years to come, he has been serving in different diplomatic missions including the Iranian Ambassador to Hungary, Kazakhstan and Spain. He was chosen as the representative of Natanz and Qamsar in Iranian legislative election for the 10th Islamic Consultative Assembly in 2016.

== Views ==
In addition to his role in the National Security and Foreign Policy Commission, he has also been active in the bills for environment and agriculture in the 10th Islamic Consultative Assembly.

== Decease ==
He died in Tehran on 26 of June 2019 after a long-term illness.
