= Ozvar, Isfahan =

Ozvar ازوار
- Village
- Location within Iran
- Coordinates: 32°31′24″N 51°55′10″E
- Country: Iran
- Province: Isfahan
- County: Isfahan
- Bakhsh: Central
- Rural District: Baraan-e Jonubi

Population (2006)
  - Total: 312
- Time zone: UTC+3:30 (IRST)
  - Summer (DST): UTC+4:30 (IRDT)

Ozvar (Persian: ازوار, also Romanized as Ozvār) is a village in Baraan-e Jonubi Rural District, in the Central District of Isfahan County, Isfahan Province, Iran. At the 2006 census, its population was 312, in 80 families.
