= Shadian, Afghanistan =

Shadian
- Location in Afghanistan
- Coordinates: 36°31′11″N 67°13′12″E
- Country: Afghanistan
- Province: Balkh Province
- Time zone: + 4.30

Shadian is a village in Balkh Province in northern Afghanistan.

== See also ==
- Balkh Province
