= Khorramdasht Rural District (Kashan County) =

Rural district in Isfahan province, Iran

Khorramdasht Rural District Persian: دهستان خرم‌دشت
- Rural District
- Location within Iran
- Coordinates: 33°48′N 51°38′E
- Country: Iran
- Province: Isfahan
- County: Kashan
- District: Central
- Established: 1993
- Capital: Khorramdasht

Population (2016)
  - Total: 1,442
- Time zone: UTC+3:30 (IRST)

Khorramdasht Rural District (Persian: دهستان خرم‌دشت) is in the Central District of Kashan County, Isfahan province, Iran. Its capital is the village of Khorramdasht.

== Demographics ==
=== Population ===
At the time of the 2006 National Census, the rural district's population was 726 in 324 households. There were 856 inhabitants in 355 households at the following census of 2011. The 2016 census measured the population of the rural district as 1,442 in 483 households. The most populous of its 29 villages was Khorramdasht, with 267 people.

=== Other villages in the rural district ===
- Asadabad-e Bala
- Chaleh Qarah
- Deh Zireh
- Nasrabad
- Shadian
- Totmach
