= Jowshaqan-e Qali Rural District =

Rural district in Isfahan province, Iran

Jowshaqan-e Qali Rural District Persian: دهستان جوشقان قالی
- Rural District
- Location within Iran
- Coordinates: 33°36′N 51°14′E
- Country: Iran
- Province: Isfahan
- County: Kashan
- District: Qamsar
- Established: 1987
- Capital: Jowshaqan-e Qali

Population (2016)
  - Total: 329
- Time zone: UTC+3:30 (IRST)

Jowshaqan-e Qali Rural District (Persian: دهستان جوشقان قالی) is in Qamsar District of Kashan County, Isfahan province, Iran. It is administered from the city of Jowshaqan-e Qali.

== Demographics ==
=== Population ===
At the time of the 2006 National Census, the rural district's population was 142 in 50 households. There were 145 inhabitants in 55 households at the following census of 2011. The 2016 census measured the population of the rural district as 329 in 114 households. The most populous of its 16 villages was Alezg, with 248 people.

=== Other villages in the rural district ===
- Kolukh-e Pain
