= Jowsheqan va Kamu =

Former city in Isfahan province, Iran

Jowsheqan va Kamu Persian: جوشقان و كامو
- Former City
- Location within Iran
- Coordinates: 33°36′21″N 51°14′14″E
- Country: Iran
- Province: Isfahan
- County: Kashan
- District: Kaki
- Established as a city: 2000

Population (2011)
  - Total: 4,766
- Time zone: UTC+3:30 (IRST)

Jowsheqan va Kamu (Persian: جوشقان و كامو) was a city in Qamsar District of Kashan County, Isfahan province, Iran. It was the merger of four earlier settlements in 2000: Chugan (چوگان), Jowsheqan (جوشقان), (Note: Also romanized as Jowsheqān; also known as Jowshaqān-e Qālī (جوشقان قالی), Jowsheqān-e-Qālī, and Jūshqān Qāli) Kamu (کامو), (Note: Also romanized as Kāmū; also known as Qamu) and Vahdatabad (وحدت آباد).

== Demographics ==
=== Population ===
At the time of the 2006 National Census, the city's population was 5,477 in 1,730 households. The following census in 2011 counted 4,766 people in 1,658 households.

In 2014, the city was split into two cities: Jowshaqan-e Qali and Kamu va Chugan.

== Geography ==
The district is primarily agricultural. The water is supplied by local springs, the river Kan, and subterranean channels (kāhriz).

== Economy ==
=== Agriculture ===
Major products are those of the cool (sardsir) climate. The farmers cultivate roses for extraction of rosewater (golāb), which is now a growing business in the region.

=== Mining ===
Jowsheqan has marble quarries, the exploitation of which has been the major industrial activity in the district.
