= Rose water =

Rose-flavored water

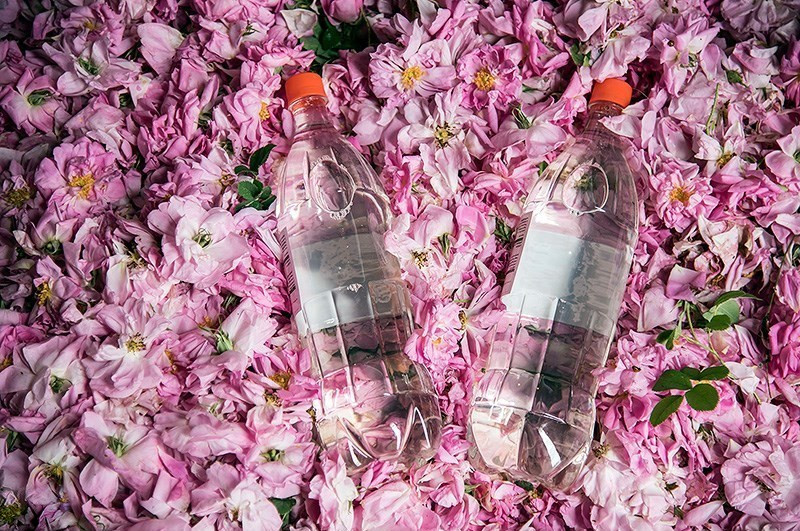
- Rose water bottles and rose petals
- Type: Flavoured water
- Place of origin: Iran (Ancient Persia)
- Region or state: Asia and Europe
- Main ingredients: Rose petals, water

Rose water or rosewater is a flavoured water created by steeping rose petals in water. It is typically made as a by-product during the distillation of rose petals to make rose oil for perfumes. Rose water is widely used to flavour culinary dishes and enhance cosmetic products, and it is significant in religious rituals throughout Eurasia. Iran is a major producer, supplying around 90% of the world's rose water demand.

Central Iran is home to the annual Golabgiri festival each spring. Thousands of tourists visit the area to celebrate the rose harvest for the production of rosewater.

== History ==
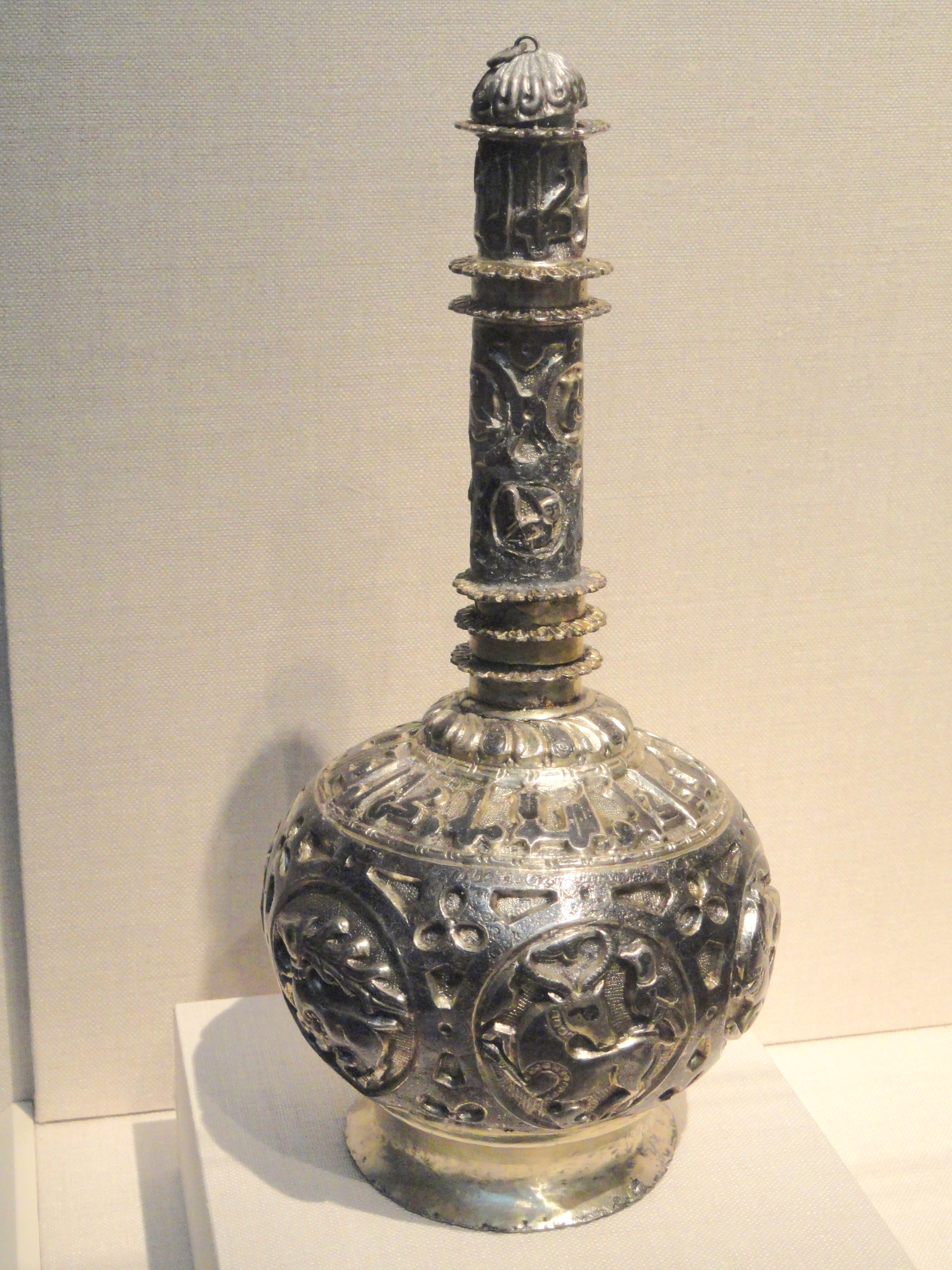
12th-century rosewater bottle from Iran (silver with gold and niello, Freer Gallery of Art, Washington, D.C.)

Rose perfumes are made from rose oil, also called "attar of roses", which is a mixture of volatile essential oils obtained by steam-distilling the crushed petals of roses; rose water is a by-product of this process. Before the technique for making rose water was developed, rose petals were used in Persian cuisine to perfume and flavour dishes. Rose water likely originated in Persia, where it is known as golāb (گلاب), from gul (گل rose) and ab (آب water).

The process of creating rose water through steam distillation was refined by Arab and Persian chemists in the medieval Islamic world, which led to more efficient and economic uses for perfume industries.

== Uses ==
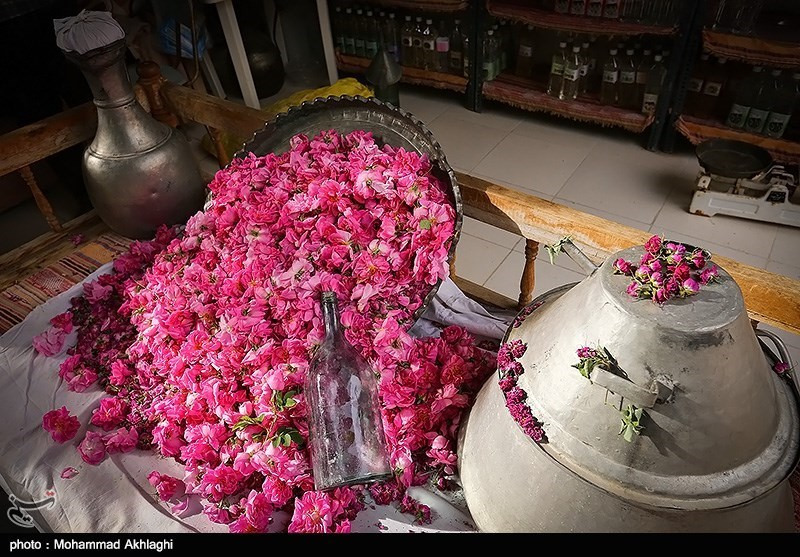
A decorative display in a small manufactory of rosewater in Kashan, Iran

=== Food ===
Rose water is an ingredient in sharbat and may be added as a flavouring to beverages, pudding, pastries, confections, and fruit dishes.

In South Asian cuisine, it is a common ingredient in sweets, such as laddu, gulab jamun, and peda. It is also used to flavour milk, lassi, rice pudding, and other dairy dishes.

In Southeast Asia, rose water is the basis for a sweet, red-tinted cordial sometimes enhanced with screwpine (pandan) and/or spices called sirap mawar or sirap ros. This concoction is often diluted to be served on its own (as air sirap), mixed with calamansi (as air sirap limau), or mixed with milk to produce a pink beverage called air bandung.

Rose water is used in various dishes, especially in sweets such as Turkish delight, nougat, and baklava. Marzipan has long been flavoured with rose water. In Cyprus, it is used to flavour a number of different desserts, including the local version of muhallebi.

It is also frequently used as a halal substitute for red wine and other alcohols in cooking. The Premier League, Bahrain Grand Prix, and Abu Dhabi Grand Prix offer a rose water-based beverage as an alternative for champagne when awarding Muslim players.

=== Cosmetics ===
In medieval Europe, rose water was used to wash hands during feasts.

=== Religion ===
Rose water is used in religious ceremonies in Christianity (in the Byzantine Rite of the Catholic Church and in the Eastern Orthodox Church), Zoroastrianism, and the Baháʼí Faith (in Kitab-i-Aqdas 1:76).

== Chemical composition ==
Depending on the origin and manufacturing method, rose water is obtained from the sepals and petals of Rosa × damascena through steam distillation. Diverse monoterpenoid and alkane components include citronellol, nonadecane, geraniol, and phenylethyl alcohol, among others; phenylethyl alcohol is responsible for the typical odour of rose water but is not always present in derivative products.

== Gallery ==
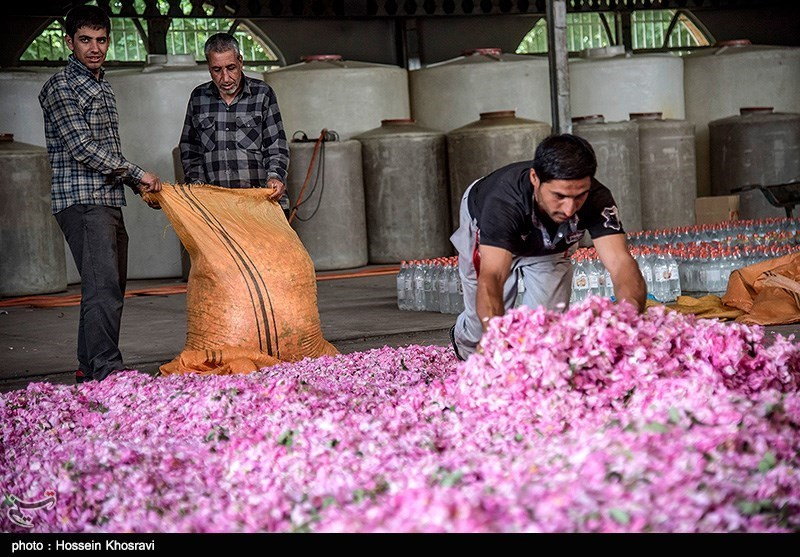
Bags of rose petals being unloaded in preparation for steeping

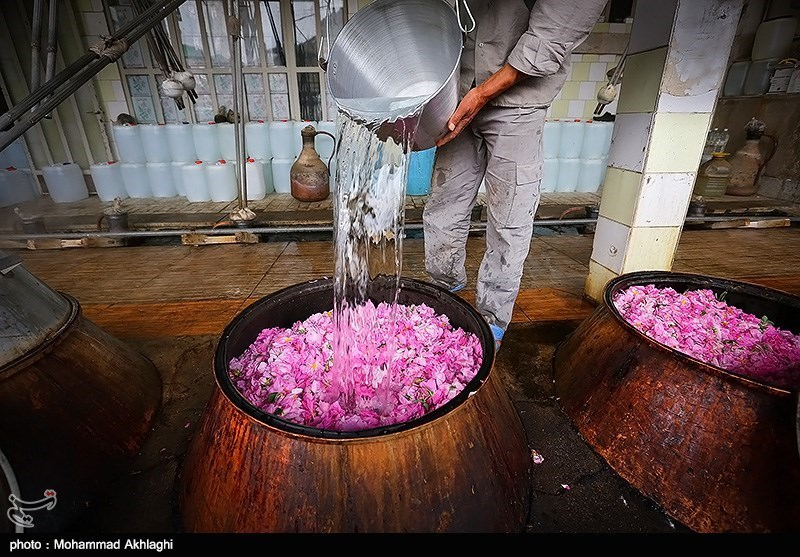
Water being poured into a container of rose petals

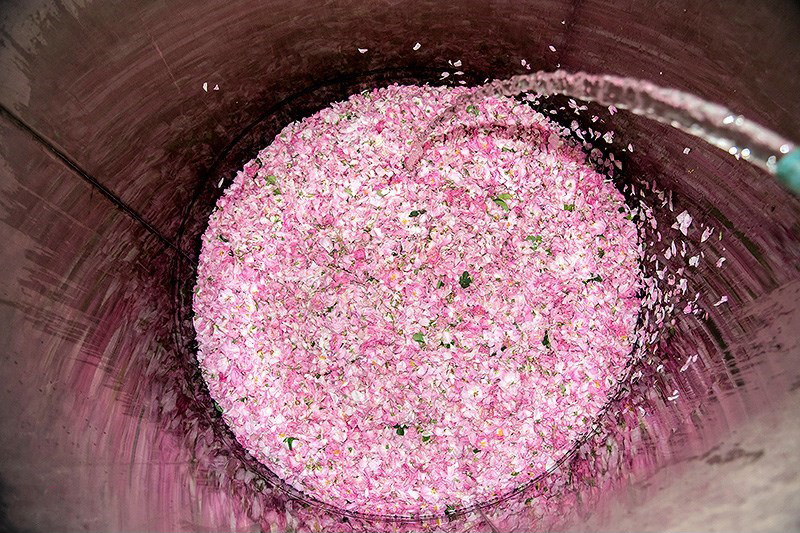
A container being filled using a hose

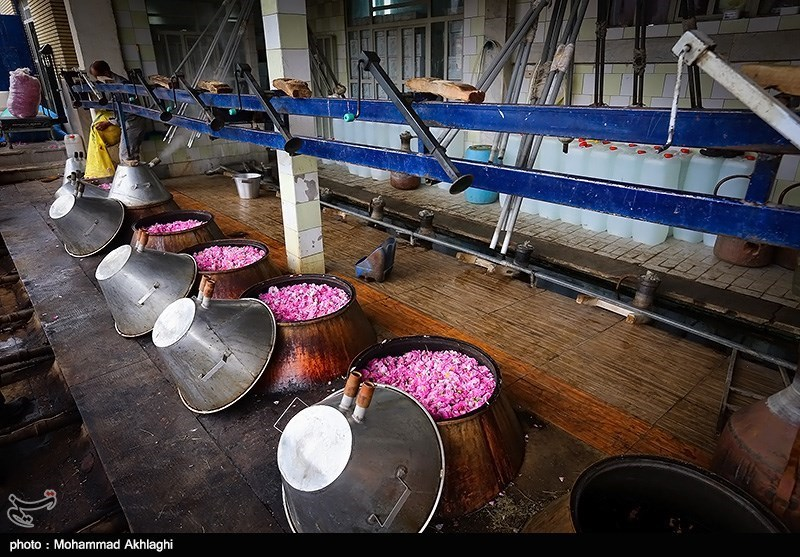
Containers of petals awaiting steeping, with one on the left closed and being heated to boil the water inside.

== See also ==
- Orange flower water
- Rosewater sprinkler
- Sharbat
