= Qamsar District =

District in Isfahan province, Iran

Qamsar District Persian: بخش قمصر
- District
- Location within Iran
- Coordinates: 33°41′N 51°21′E
- Country: Iran
- Province: Isfahan
- County: Kashan
- Capital: Qamsar

Population (2016)
  - Total: 13,247
- Time zone: UTC+3:30 (IRST)

Qamsar District (Persian: بخش قمصر) is in Kashan County, Isfahan province, Iran. Its capital is the city of Qamsar. A mine in the area has been an important source of cobalt probably since ancient times.

== History ==
The city of Jowsheqan va Kamu was split into the two cities of Jowshaqan-e Qali and Kamu va Chugan in 2014.

== Demographics ==
=== Population ===
At the time of the 2006 census, the district's population was 10,812 in 3,409 households. The following census in 2011 counted 9,225 people in 3,143 households. The 2016 census measured the population of the district as 13,247 inhabitants in 4,653 households.

=== Administrative divisions ===
Qamsar District Population
Administrative Divisions	2006	2011	2016
Jowshaqan-e Qali RD	142	145	329
Qohrud RD	1,627	904	2,426
Jowshaqan-e Qali (city)			4,181
Jowsheqan va Kamu (city) (Note: Merger of four villages; split into two cities after the 2011 census)	5,477	4,766	
Kamu va Chugan (city)			2,434
Qamsar (city)	3,566	3,410	3,877
Total	10,812	9,225	13,247
RD = Rural District
