= Barzok District =

District in Isfahan province, Iran

Barzok District Persian: بخش برزک
- District
- Location within Iran
- Coordinates: 33°47′N 51°09′E
- Country: Iran
- Province: Isfahan
- County: Kashan
- Established: 2001
- Capital: Barzok

Population (2016)
  - Total: 14,910
- Time zone: UTC+3:30 (IRST)

Barzok District (Persian: بخش برزک) is in Kashan County, Isfahan province, Iran. Its capital is the city of Barzok.

== Demographics ==
=== Population ===
At the time of the 2006 National Census, the district's population was 10,267 in 3,065 households. The following census in 2011 counted 11,215 people in 3,504 households. The 2016 census measured the population of the district as 14,910 inhabitants in 4,991 households.

=== Administrative divisions ===
Barzok District Population
Administrative Divisions	2006	2011	2016
Babaafzal RD (Note: Formerly Barzok Rural District)	1,904	1,879	2,393
Golab RD	5,152	6,071	7,929
Barzok (city)	3,211	3,265	4,588
Total	10,267	11,215	14,910
RD = Rural District
