= Central District (Kashan County) =

District in Isfahan province, Iran

Central District (Kashan County) Persian: بخش مرکزی شهرستان کاشان
- District
- Location within Iran
- Coordinates: 34°02′N 51°18′E
- Country: Iran
- Province: Isfahan
- County: Kashan
- Capital: Kashan

Population (2016)
  - Total: 324,501
- Time zone: UTC+3:30 (IRST)

The Central District of Kashan County (Persian: بخش مرکزی شهرستان کاشان) is in Isfahan province, Iran. Its capital is the city of Kashan.

== Demographics ==
=== Population ===
At the time of the 2006 National Census, the district's population was 266,921 in 72,469 households. The following census in 2011 counted 293,996 people in 85,589 households. The 2016 census measured the population of the district as 324,501 inhabitants in 98,513 households.

=== Administrative divisions ===
Central District (Kashan County) Population
Administrative Divisions	2006	2011	2016
Khorramdasht RD	726	856	1,442
Kuhpayeh RD	5,074	5,284	6,317
Miyandasht RD	7,372	7,662	6,898
Kashan (city)	248,789	275,325	304,487
Meshkat (city)	4,960	4,869	5,357
Total	266,921	293,996	324,501
RD = Rural District
