= Kashan County =

County in Isfahan province, Iran

Kashan County Persian: شهرستان کاشان
- County
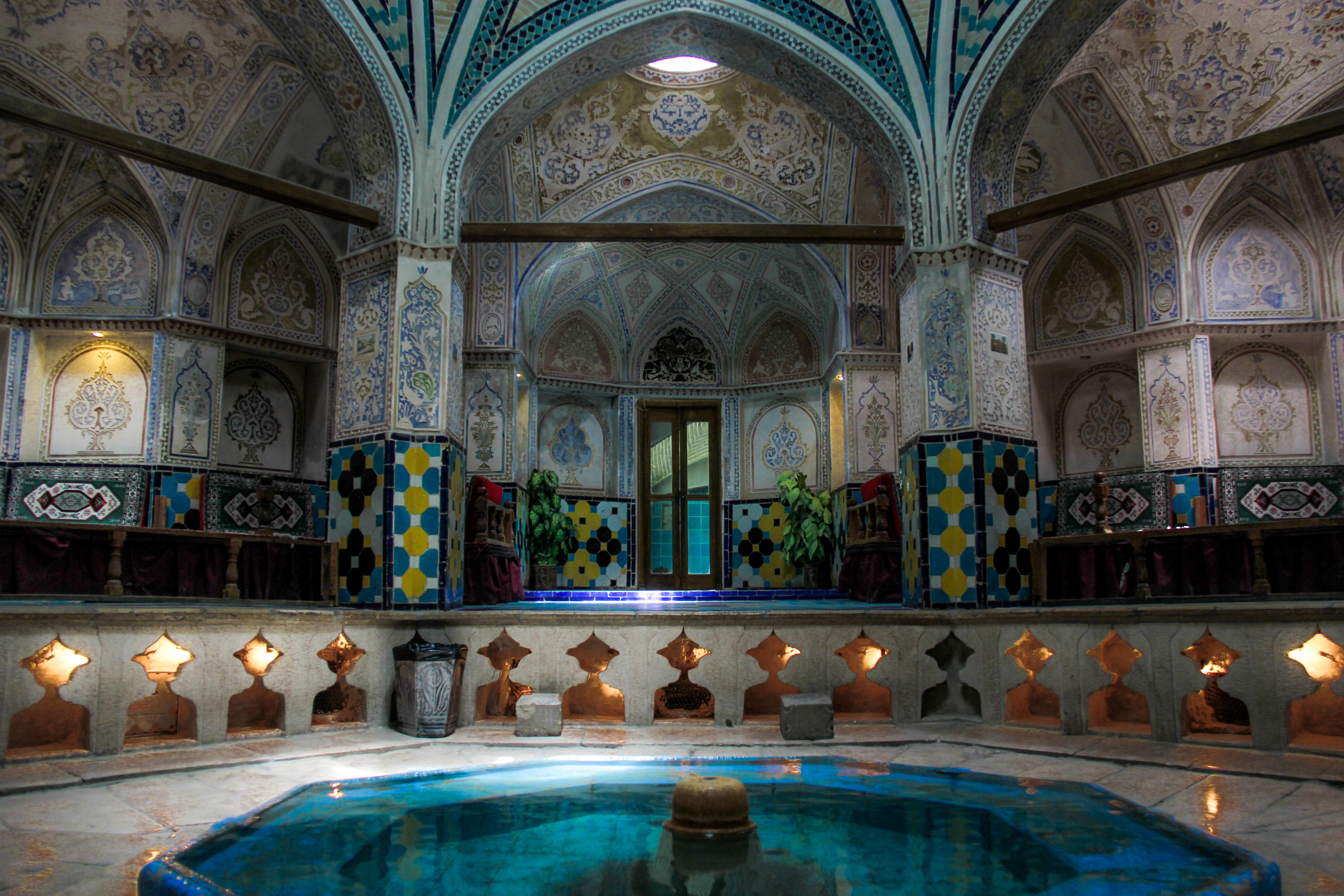
- Soltan Amir Ahmad Bath

- Location of Kashan County in Isfahan province (top center, purple)

- Location of Isfahan province in Iran
- Coordinates: 33°58′N 51°20′E
- Country: Iran
- Province: Isfahan
- Capital: Kashan
- Districts: Central, Barzok, Neyasar, Qamsar

Population (2016)
  - Total: 364,482
- Time zone: UTC+3:30 (IRST)

Kashan County (Persian: شهرستان کاشان) is in Isfahan province, Iran. Its capital is the city of Kashan.

== History ==
The etymology of the city's name comes from Kasian, the original inhabitants of the city, whose remains are found at Tapeh Sialk dating back 9,000 years; later this changed to Kashian, hence the town name. Between the 12th and the 14th centuries, Kashan was an important centre for the production of high quality pottery and tiles. In modern Persian, the word for a tile (kashi) comes from the name of the town.

Archeological discoveries in the Sialk Hillocks, which lie 4 km west of Kashan, reveal that this region was one of the primary centers of civilization in pre-historic ages. Kashan dates back to the Elamite period of Iran. The Sialk ziggurat still stands today in the suburbs of Kashan after 7,000 years.

The artifacts uncovered at Sialk reside in the Louvre in Paris, the New York Metropolitan Museum of Art, and Iran's National Museum.

By some accounts, although not all, Kashan was the origin of the three wise men who followed the star that guided them to Bethlehem to witness the nativity of Jesus, as recounted in the Bible. Whatever the historical validity of this story, the attribution of Kashan as their original home testifies to the city's prestige at the time the story was set down.

According to a legend dating from the Safavid era, Abu Lu'lu'a, the Persian skilled craftsman who was enslaved by the Islamic conquerors and who eventually assassinated the caliph Umar ibn al-Khattab in 644, fled to Kashan after the assassination. The shrine that was built over his supposed tomb is one of Kashan's notable landmarks.

Sultan Malik Shah I of the Seljuk dynasty ordered the building of a fortress in the middle of Kashan in the 11th century. The fortress walls, called Ghal'eh Jalali still stand today in central Kashan.

Kashan was also a leisure vacation spot for Safavid shahs. Fin Garden, specifically, is one of the most famous gardens in Iran. The garden, with its pool and orchards, was designed for Shah Abbas I as a classical Persian vision of paradise. The original Safavid buildings have been substantially replaced and rebuilt in the Qajar era, although the layout of trees and marble basins is close to the original. The garden itself, however, was first founded 7,000 years ago alongside the Cheshmeh-ye-Soleiman. The garden is also notorious as the site of the 1852 murder of Amir Kabir, the reformist chancellor of Naser al-Din Shah Qajar (r. 1848–1896).

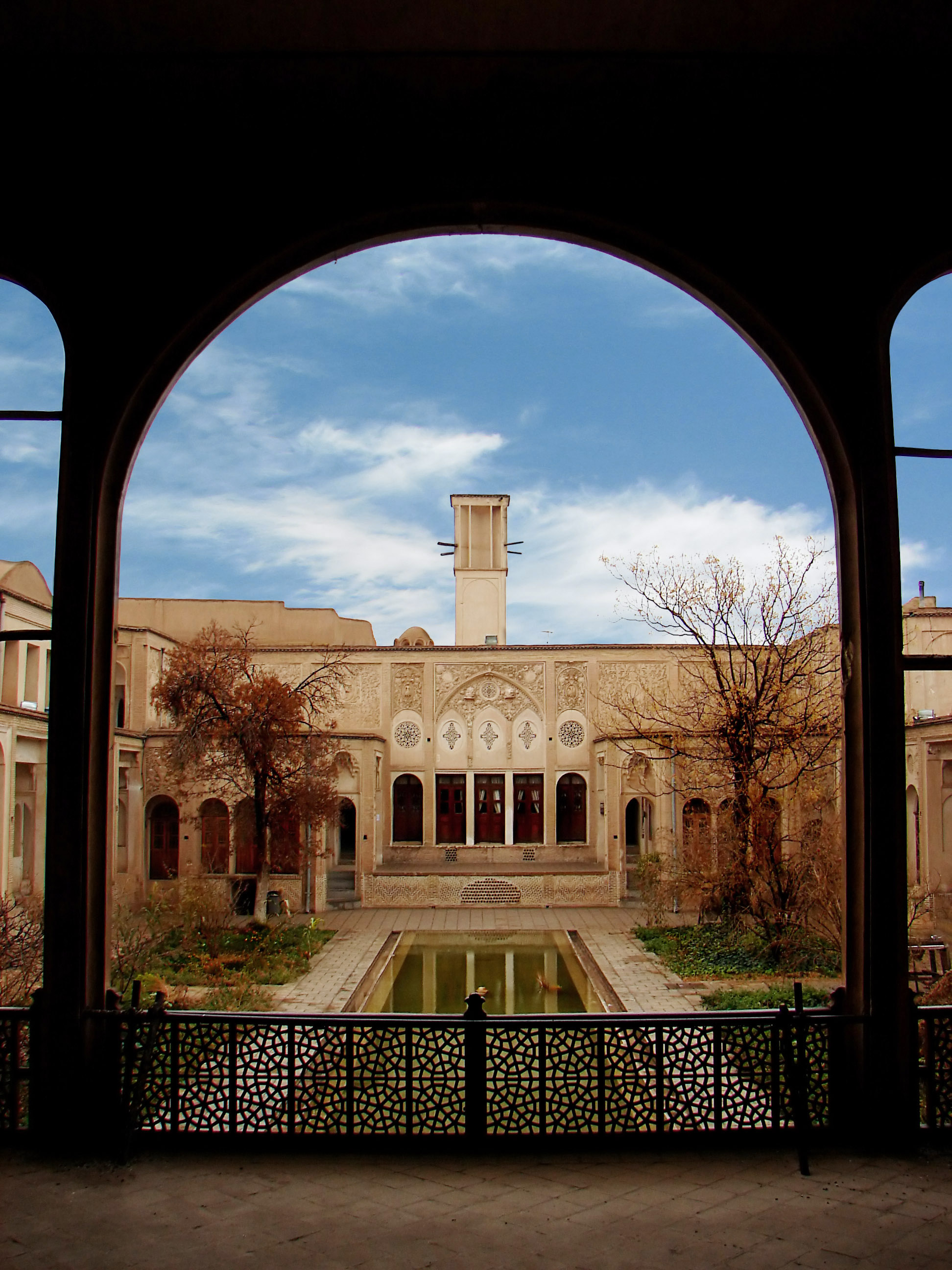
Borujerdi House, 1850s.

The earthquake of 1778 levelled the city of Kashan and all the edifices of Shah Abbas I, leaving 8,000 casualties. However, the city was rebuilt and has today become a focal tourist attraction due to its numerous large houses from the 18th and 19th centuries, illustrating the finest examples of Qajar aesthetics.

The city of Jowsheqan va Kamu was split into the two cities of Jowshaqan-e Qali and Kamu va Chugan in 2014.

== Demographics ==
=== Population ===
At the time of the 2006 National Census, the county's population was 297,000 in 81,816 households. The following census in 2011 counted 323,371 people in 95,260 households. The 2016 census measured the population of the county as 364,482 in 112,258 households.

=== Administrative divisions ===
Kashan County's population history and administrative structure over three consecutive censuses are shown in the following table.

Kashan County Population
Administrative Divisions	2006	2011	2016
Central District	266,921	293,996	324,501
Khorramdasht RD	726	856	1,442
Kuhpayeh RD	5,074	5,284	6,317
Miyandasht RD	7,372	7,662	6,898
Kashan (city)	248,789	275,325	304,487
Meshkat (city)	4,960	4,869	5,357
Barzok District	10,267	11,215	14,910
Babaafzal RD (Note: Formerly Barzok Rural District)	1,904	1,879	2,393
Golab RD	5,152	6,071	7,929
Barzok (city)	3,211	3,265	4,588
Neyasar District	9,000	8,935	11,821
Kuh Dasht RD	2,174	2,322	3,555
Neyasar RD	4,823	4,442	5,947
Neyasar (city)	2,003	2,171	2,319
Qamsar District	10,812	9,225	13,247
Jowshaqan-e Qali RD	142	145	329
Qohrud RD	1,627	904	2,426
Jowshaqan-e Qali (city)			4,181
Jowsheqan va Kamu (city) (Note: Merger of four villages; split into two cities after the 2011 census)	5,477	4,766	
Kamu va Chugan (city)			2,434
Qamsar (city)	3,566	3,410	3,877
Total	297,000	323,371	364,482
RD = Rural District

== Geography ==
To the north is Qom County; to the east is Aran and Bidgol County, the desert, and the salt lake; to the south is Isfahan County; and to the west are the Karkas Mountains.

The rivers flowing from the mountains to the desert are small and temporary. The most important is Shah Ab, originating in Qohrud Rural District. Irrigation is mainly dependent on subterranean channels, and the water is slightly salty. There are also several springs, the most notable of which is the Fin water source.

== Kashan County today ==
Although there are many sites in Kashan of potential interest to tourists, the city remains largely undeveloped in this sector, with fewer than a thousand foreign tourists per year. Qamsar and Abyaneh are notable towns around Kashan, which attract tourists all year around. The nearby town of Niasar features a man-made cave and fireplace of historical interest.

Kashan is famous for manufacturing carpets, silk and other textiles, after Aran va bidgol. Kashan today has an active marble and copper mining industry.

Qaleh Jalali is not in the centre of Kashan, but is on the edge of the southern margin of the old wall of the city; the southern part of the wall and the qaleh (the citadel) join up and form just one piece. Areas outside the wall used to be simply irrigated farmlands, but today are sporadically residential.

== Tourism ==
Kashan has many tourist locations.

Fin Garden to the west of Kashan, at the end of Amir Kabir Road (Fin road), is an old and beautiful garden from 300 years ago. The garden has a museum and a bath. In the museum are many ancient tools from 3,000 years ago. Amir Kabir, the reformist chief minister to Naser al-Din Shah Qajar (r. 1848–1896), was killed in the bathhouse in 1852.

The ancient Tepe Sialk (or Sialk hill) ziggurat is on Amir Kabir road and tourists can visit this ancient hill that was used 3,500 years ago.

Ancient houses are located in the Soltan Mir Ahmad neighborhood in Alavi Street. In this neighborhood are many ancient houses from 300 years ago.

The Karkas mountains are behind the Fin Garden and the Tehran-Isfahan Highway.

The most important Kashan souvenirs are cotton candy, pancakes, sesame, and rosewater.

== Main sights ==
Kashan's architectural sights include:

- Agha Bozorg Mosque
- Āmeri House
- Boroujerdi House
- Jalali castle
- Tabātabāei House
- Abbāsi House
- Attarha House
- Al-e Yaseen House
- Sultan Amir shrine and bath
- 40 Dokhtaran Fortress
- Shrine of Abu Lu'lu'a, the assassin of the second caliph Umar ibn al-Khattab
- Fin Garden
- Sialk ziggurat
- Ghal'eh jalali
- Kashan Bazaar
- Timcheh Amin-o-dowleh

== Transportation ==
- Road 71
- Freeway 7, located near the city

Kashan is connected via freeways to Isfahan and Natanz to the South, and Qom, which is an hour drive away to the north.

== Education ==
Colleges and universities in Kashan include:

- Kashan University of Medical Sciences
- Islamic Azad University of Kashan
- University of Kashan

== Notable people ==
- Sohrab Sepehri
- Ghyath ad-Din Jamshid Kashani
- Kamal-ol-Molk
- Mohammad-Nabi Sarbolouki
- Ustad Ali Maryam
- Muhsen Feyz Kashani
- Yedidia Shofet, former chief rabbi of Iran and the worldwide spiritual leader of Persian Jewry
- Uriel Davidi, former chief rabbi of Iran and the worldwide spiritual leader of Persian Jewry
- Isaac Larian, Chief Executive Officer of MGA Entertainment
- David Alliance, Baron Alliance, businessman and a Liberal Democrat politician in the United Kingdom
- Seyyed Hossein Nasr, leading Islamic philosopher and exponent of the Perennial Philosophy

== Sister cities ==
- Umeå, Sweden
- Kazanlak, Bulgaria
- Sabzevar, Iran

== See also ==
- Iranian Architecture
- Kashan rug
- List of historical structures in Isfahan province
- Sialk, Kashan's ancient architecture.
- Traditional Persian residential architecture

Media related to Kashan County at Wikimedia Commons
