= Traditional Persian residential architecture =

Style of architecture used in Iran

Traditional Persian residential architecture is the architecture employed by builders and craftsmen in Greater Iran and the surrounding regions influenced by Persian culture to construct vernacular houses. The art draws from various eras and elements of Persia.

== Persian residential architecture ==
The climate of Iran poses many challenges for residents, such as hot summers and cold winters. Traditional architecture has thus been designed in proportion to its environmental conditions. The continued design and existence of traditional homes among the increase of mid-rise apartments in Iran's ongoing modernisation projects is testament to a strong connection and identification with Persian architectural heritage.

Iran's old city fabric is composed of narrow winding streets with high walls of adobe and brick called koocheh, often roofed at various intervals. This form of urban design, which used to be commonplace in Iran, is an optimal form of architecture that minimizes the expansion of arid regions and the effects of storms. It also maximizes daytime shades, and insulates the urban fabric from severe winter temperatures of the Iranian Plateau. Koocheh are important for preserving history and community, as they can both serve as spaces for socialisation and a cultural display of architecture.

Religious beliefs coupled with the necessity to defend cities against frequent foreign invasions encouraged traditional Persian residential architects to create inward seeking designs amidst these narrow complicated koochehs, weaving tightly knit residential neighborhoods. Thus, the house becomes the container as opposed to the contained. These houses possess an innate system of protection: they all have enclosed gardens with maximum privacy, preventing any view into the house from the outside world. Hence, residential architecture in Persia was designed in a way to provide maximum protection to the inhabitants during times of tension and danger, while furnishing a microcosm of tranquillity that protected this inner Persian "paradise garden".

Neighborhoods in old Persian cities often formed around shrines of popular saints. All public facilities such as baths, houses of mourning (takyehs), teahouses, administration offices, and schools were to be found within the neighborhood itself. In addition to the main bazaar of the city, each neighborhood often had its own bazaar-cheh (i.e. "little bazaar"), as well as its own ab anbar (or public water reservoir), which provided the neighborhood with clean water. Qazvin, for example, had over 100 such reservoirs before being modernized with city plumbing in modern times.

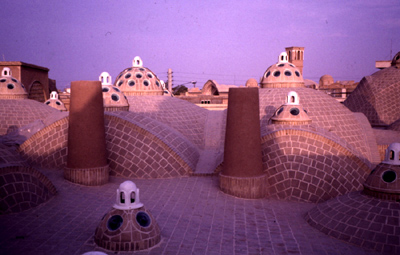
A roofscape of a traditional neighborhood in Kashan. The roof in the foreground belongs to a Qajar era bath-house.

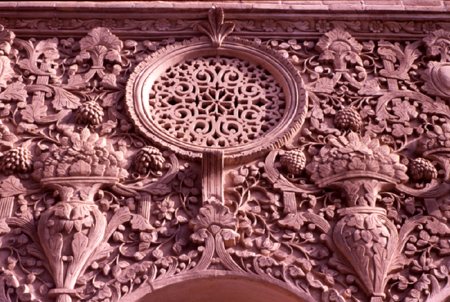
Stucco reliefs from Borujerdi-ha House, Kashan.

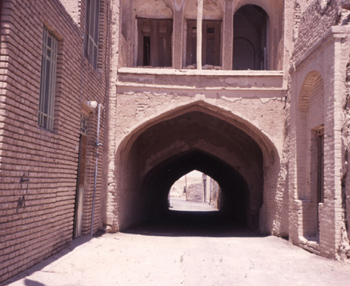
Koochehs provided relief from storms. This was an efficient and ancient form of urban design in Persia. Photograph is from Nain.

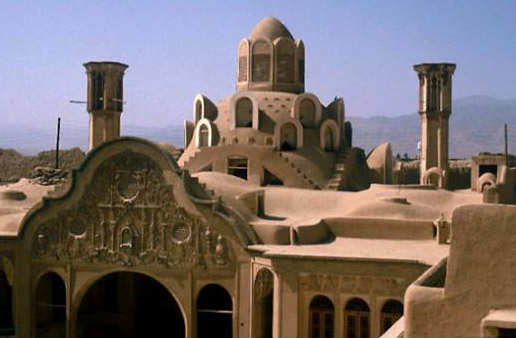
Borujerdi-ha House, 1857, Kashan, a masterpiece of design.

Like many other cities throughout Iran, stucco was the most widespread method of ornamentation in Persian houses. One reason was the relatively cheap price of the materials used (like gypsum for example) that don't require a high temperature to be transformed into plaster. This is an important consideration in places like central Iran where wood is relatively scarce. Another reason is that it is easily shaped, molded, or carved. Thanks to stucco, a wall of crudely fashioned stone blocks or raw brick, gives an impression of great luxury. Thus, stucco owes its luxurious appearance to the skill of the craftsman. And with a tradition of stucco technique going back to pre-Islamic Iran, this is an art fully mastered by Persian craftsmen, as seen here.

Earthquakes in Iran can cause severe damage. Most of Iran's remaining traditional houses date from the post-quake eras during the Qajar period. Despite this, the efforts of Persian architects to build resistance to earthquakes into their works led to many buildings remaining such as the spectacular Safavid Persian palaces as recounted by French and British explorers in many parts of Persia.

== Characteristics of traditional Persian residential architecture ==
Almost all traditional Persian houses were designed to satisfy the following essential features:

1. Hashti and Dalan-e-vorudi: Entering the doorway one steps into a small enclosed transitional space called Hashti. Here one is forced to redirect one's steps away from the street and into the hallway, called Dalan e Vorudi. In mosques, the Hashti enables the architect to turn the steps of the believer to the correct orientation for prayer hence allowing purifying oneself before entering the mosque.
2. Convenient access to all parts of the house.
3. A central pool (howz) with surrounding gardens containing trees of figs, pomegranates, and grape vines.
4. Important partitionings such as the biruni (exterior) and the andaruni (interior).
5. Specific orientation facing toward and away from Mecca.

Furthermore, Persian houses in central Iran were designed to make use of a system of wind catchers that create unusually cool temperatures in the lower levels of the building. Thick massive walls were designed to keep the sun's heat out in the summertime while retaining the internal heat in the winters.

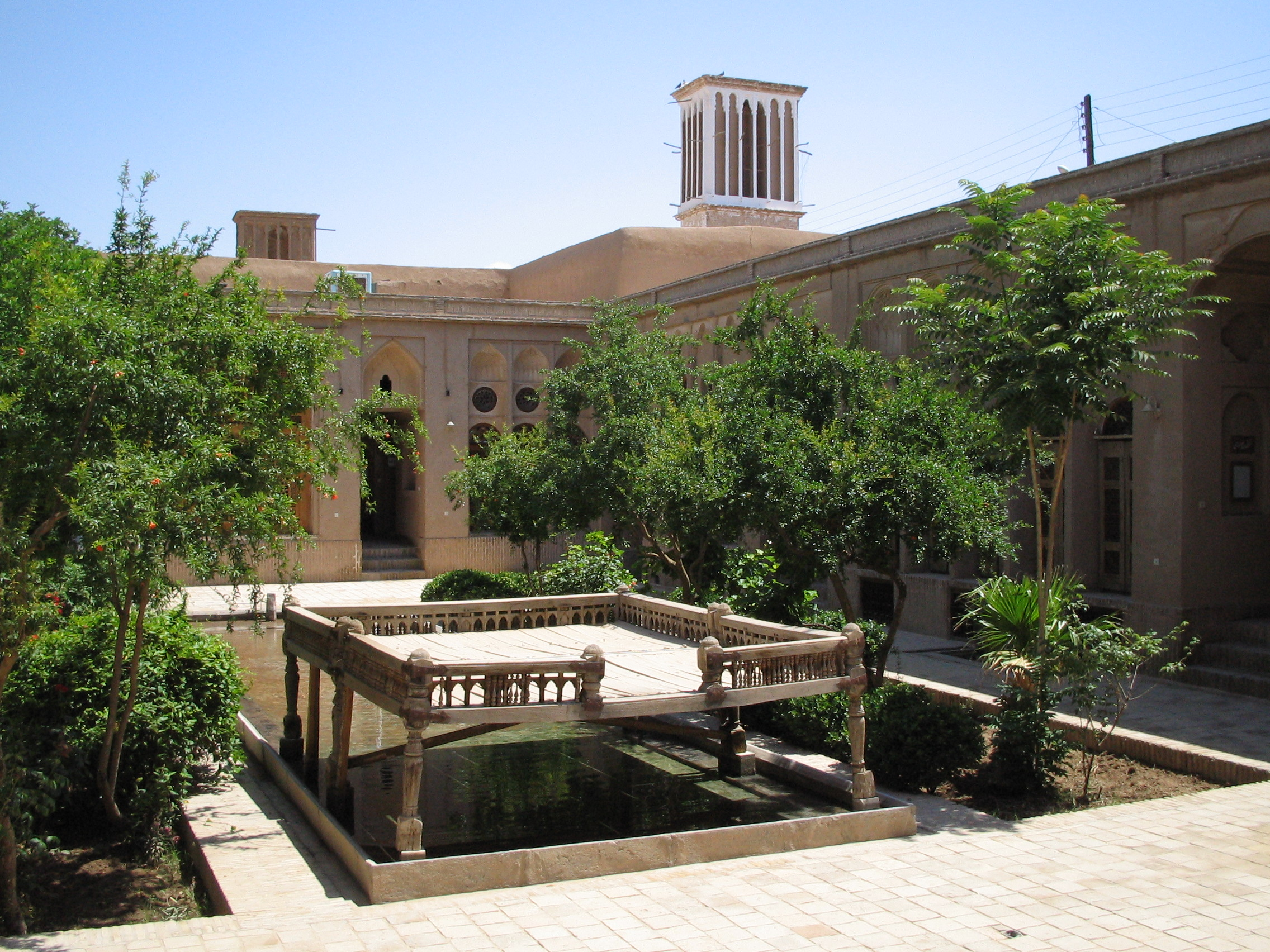
The courtyard of the Lari House in Yazd.

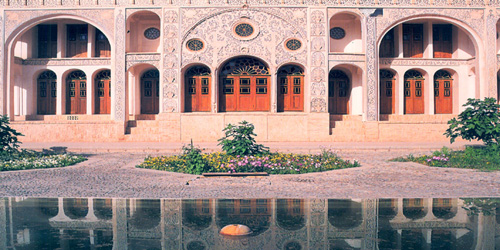
The Tabatabaei residence, Kashan, mid-1800s.

Persian residential architecture in hot arid regions incorporated a range of features, including sunken sitting rooms (talar), roofscapes with light wells, intricate window and mirror work, paintings and reliefs, and iwans. Geometric patterns were commonly seen, such as those featured the Safavid era buildings of Isfahan. Gardens and interior decorative plants were favorites. Houses could also feature stucco carvings, frescoes, and paintings made by royal craftsmen.

== Elements ==
- Talar
- Iwan
- Dalan-e vorudi
- Badgir
- Qanat
- Kariz
- Gonbad
- Garden (hayāt)
- Shabestan
- Kucheh
- Panjdari
- Hashti
- Andaruni
- Biruni
- Ab anbar
- Yakhchal
- Howz

== Samples ==
- Abbasian House
- House of Tabatabaei
- Amerian House
- Borujerdi ha House
- House of Qavam
- Tiznoo House
