= Borujerdi House =

Historic house in Kashan, Iran

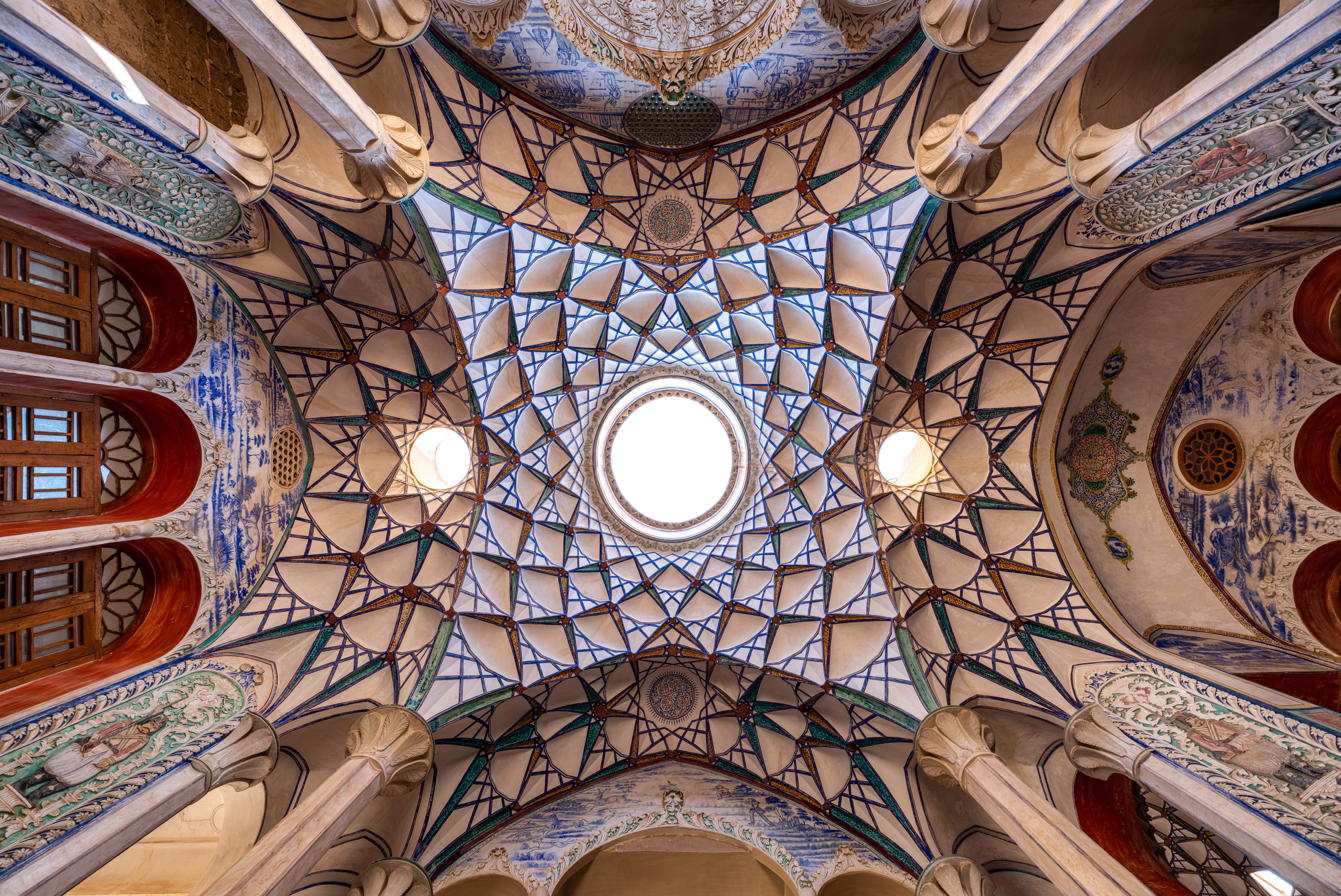
- Interactive map of the Borujerdi House area

General information
- Architectural style: Qajaresque Neo-Baroque architecture
- Location: Kashan, Iran
- Coordinates: 33.9746°N 51.4407°E

The Borujerdi House (Persian: خانه بروجردی‌ها) is a historic house museum in Kashan, Iran. It was built in 1857 by architect Ustad Ali Maryam for the bride of Borujerdi, a wealthy merchant. The bride came from the affluent Tabātabāei family, for whom the architect had built the nearby Tabatabai House several years earlier.

== Structure ==
The Borujerdi House consists of the biruni ("exterior", the public area) and the andaruni ("interior", the private quarters) features of Iran's traditional residential architecture, including a courtyard with a fountain pool and a two-story iwan (balcony). The main hall is topped by a khishkhan, that is a type of central dome. Three 40-meter-tall windcatchers, two above the main hall and one over the entrance area, are also erected on the house. The house is decorated with stucco, glass work, ayeneh-kari, and features frescoes by the prominent painter Kamal-ol-Molk.

== Gallery ==
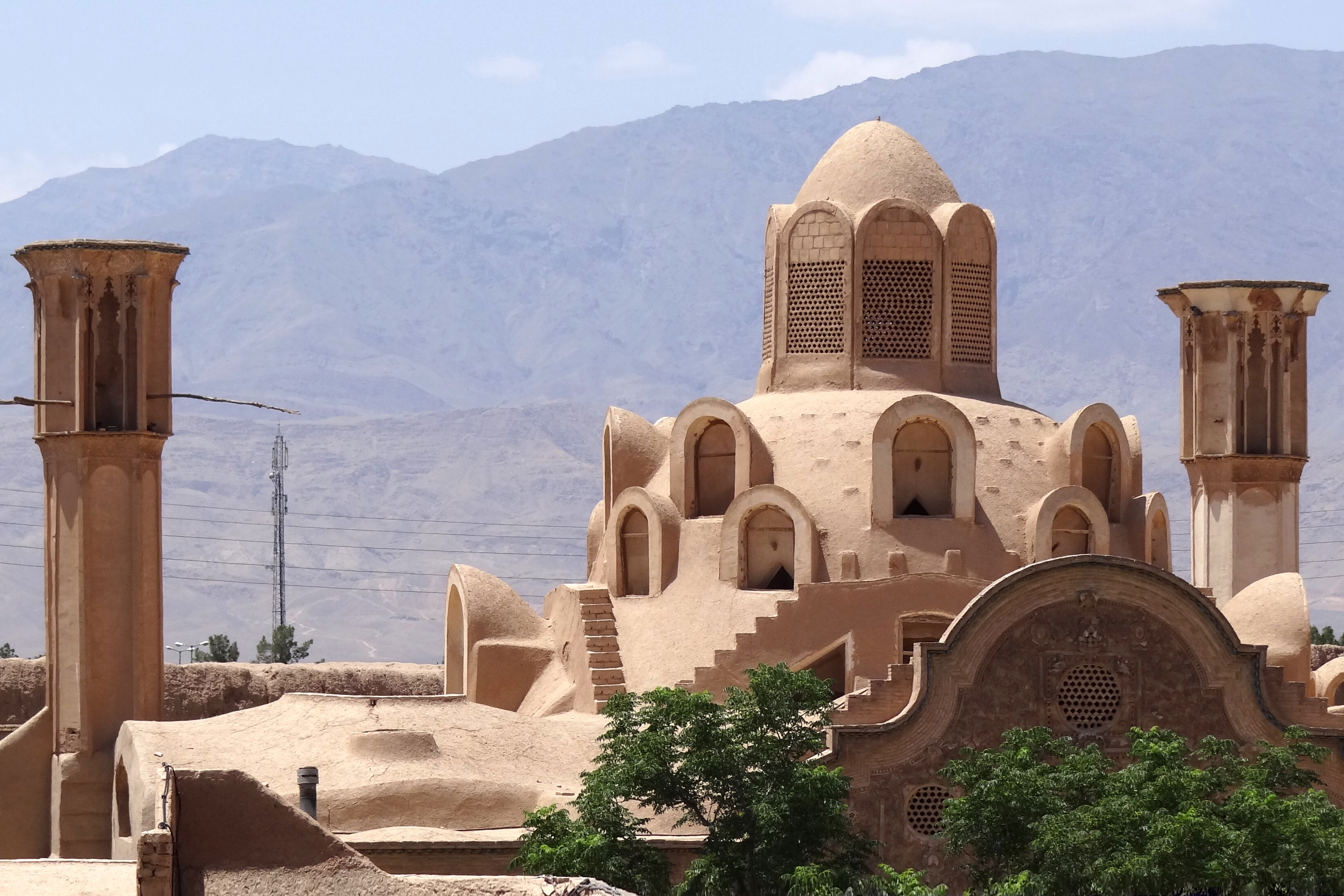
The dome of the talar and the two windcatchers on the house's roof.

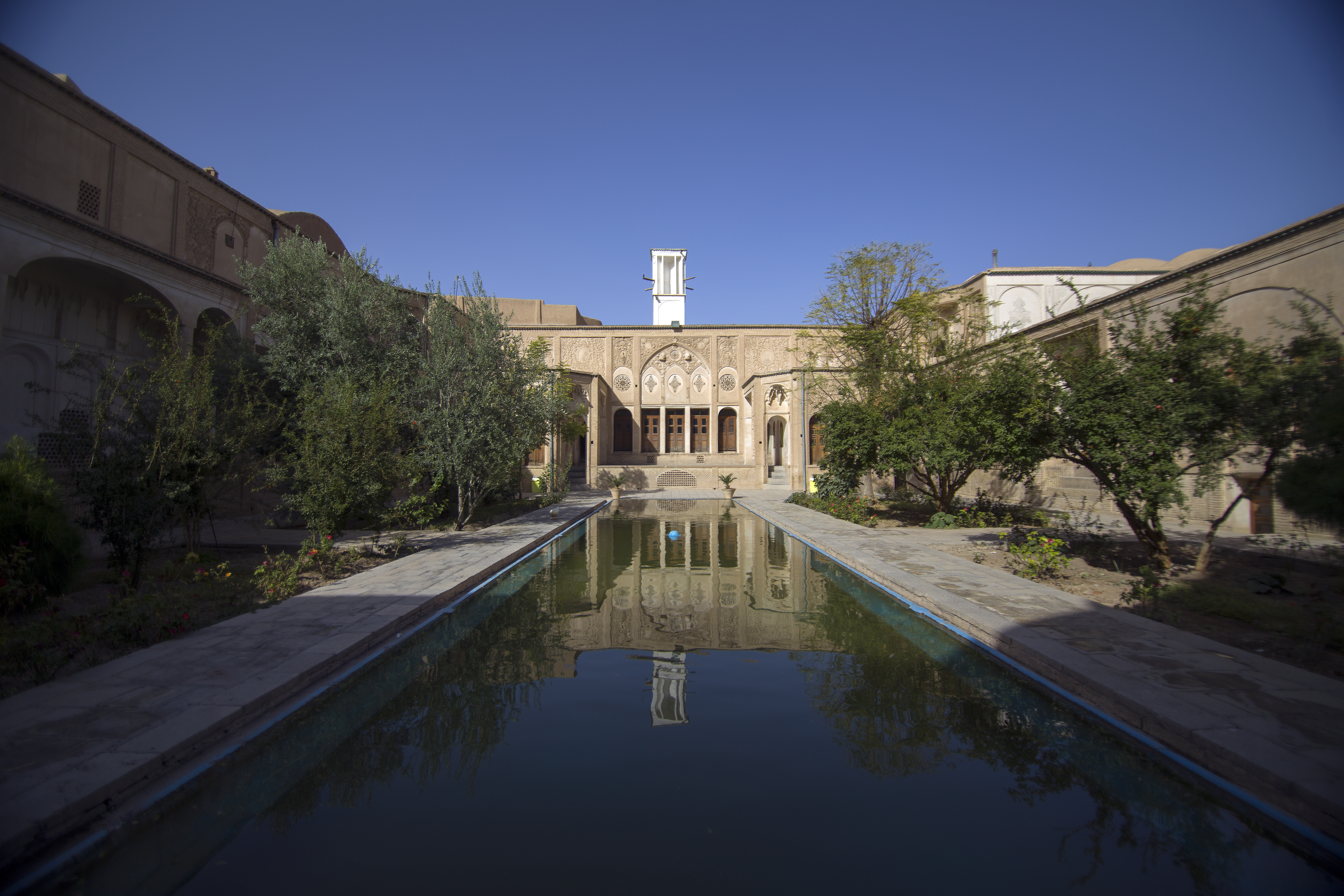
The courtyard of the Borujerdi House.

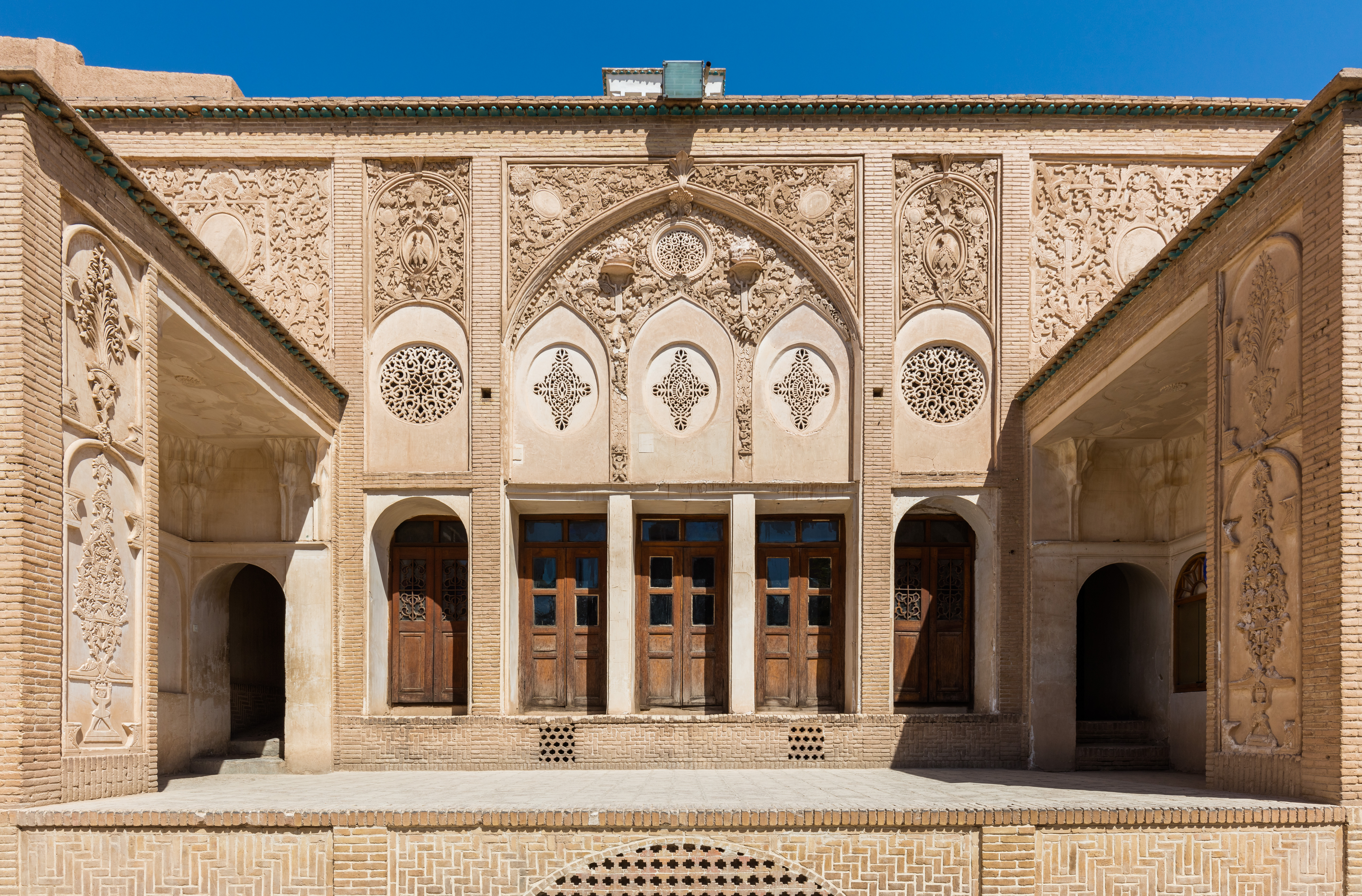
Exterior of the Borujerdi House.

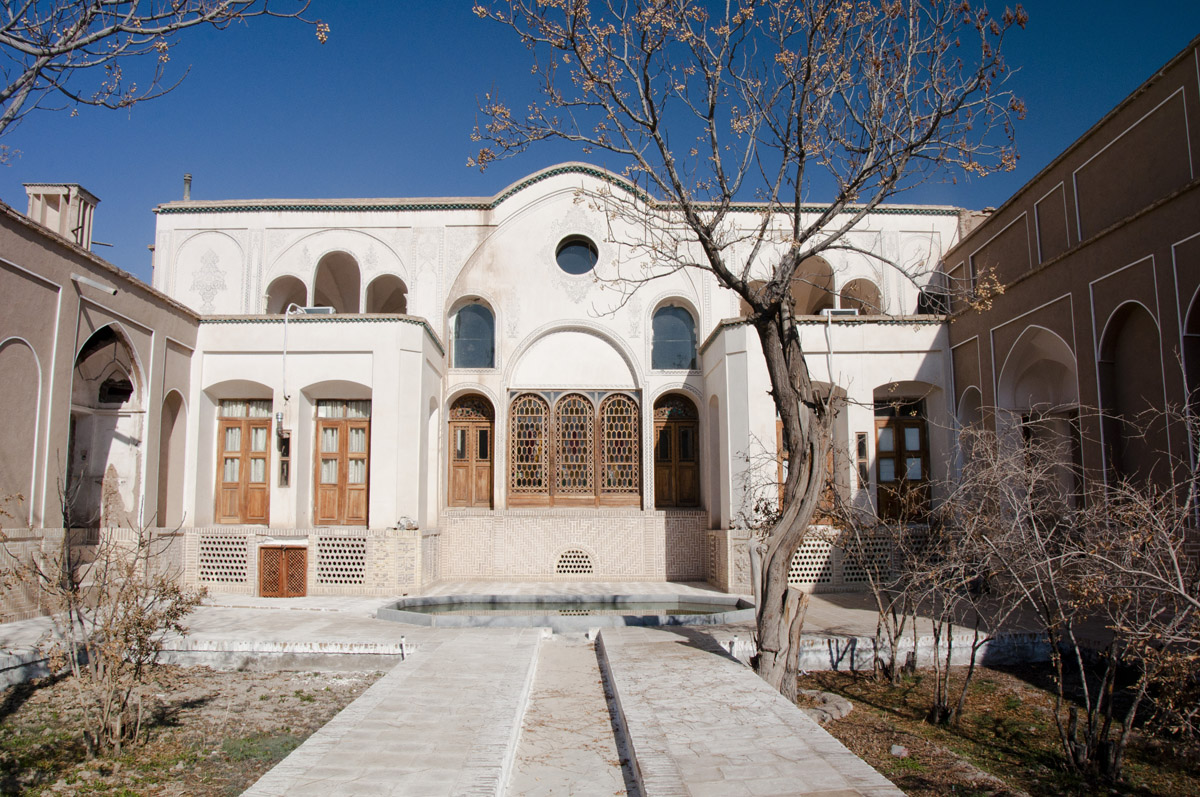
Exterior of the Borujerdi House.

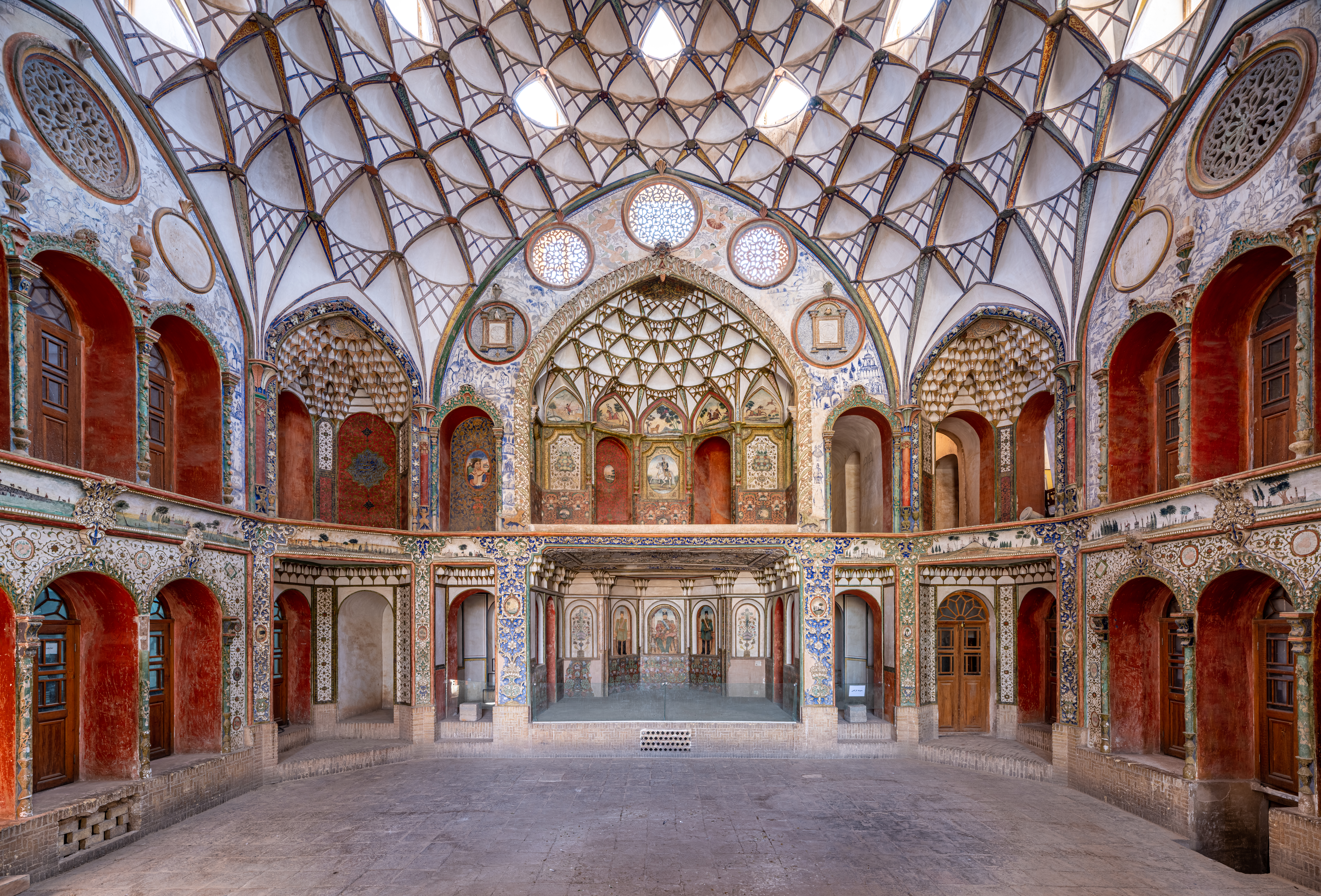
Interior of the Borujerdi House.

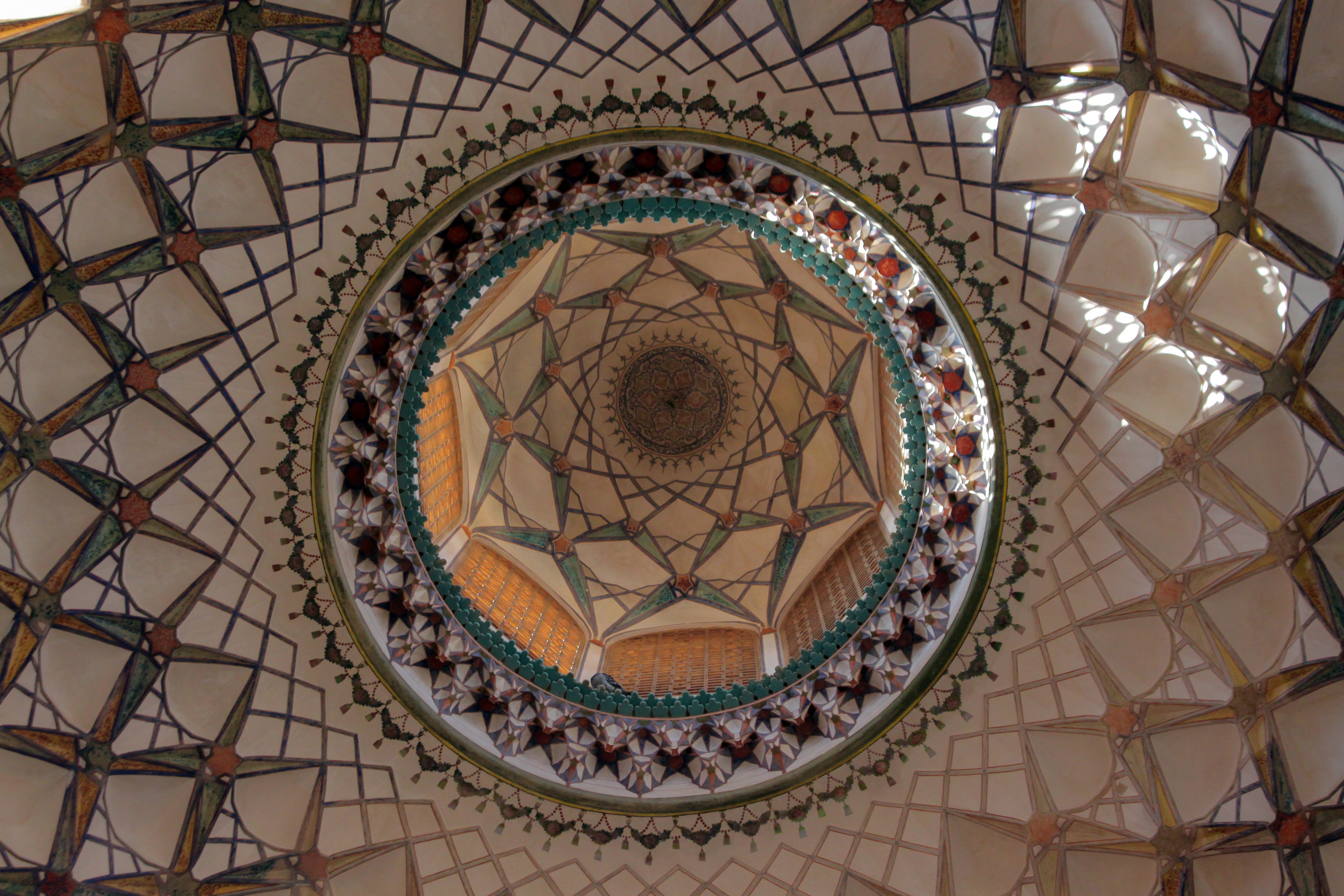
Interior of the main dome of the Borujerdi House.

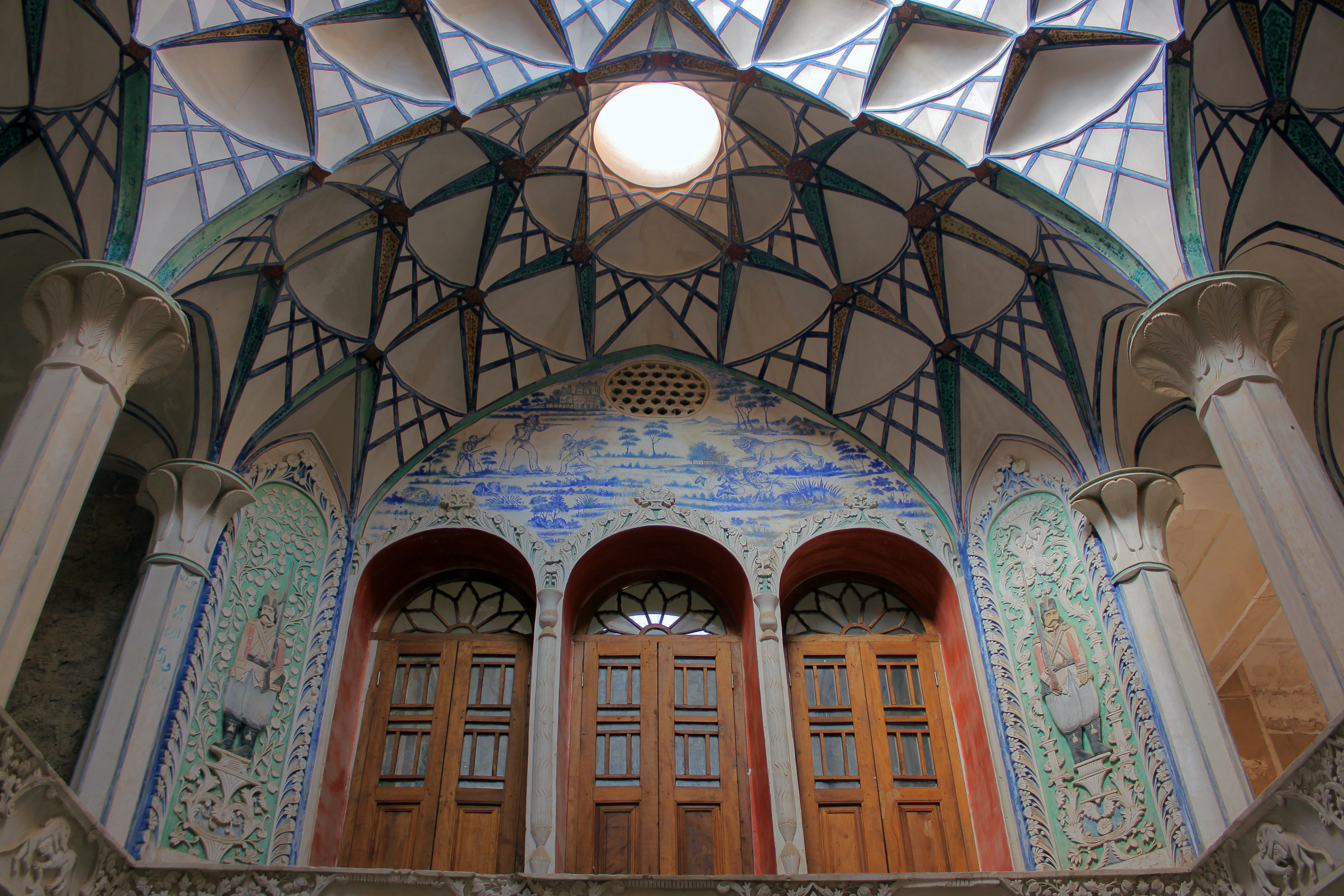
Wooden windows and wall carvings at the Borujerdi House.

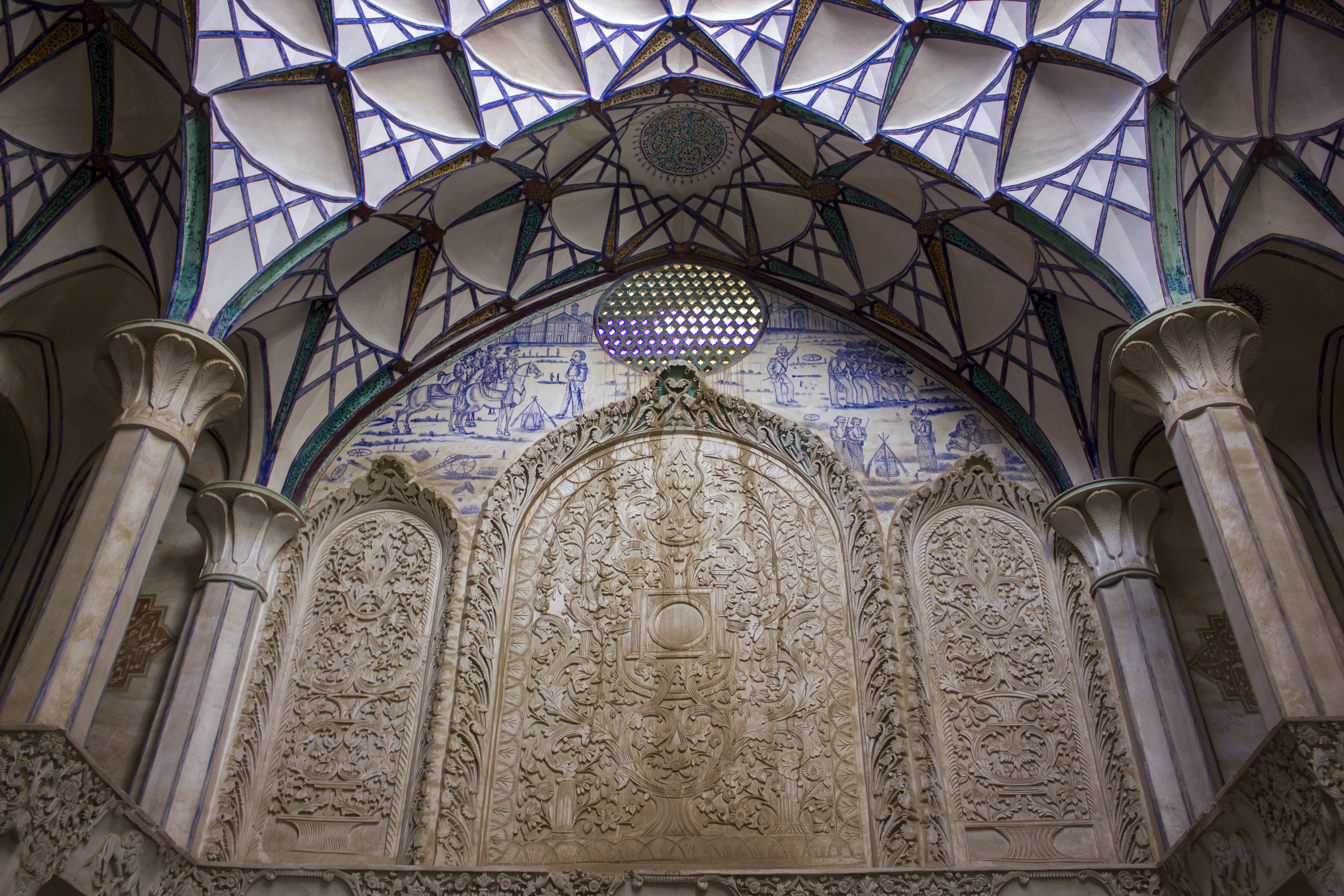
Wall carvings inside the Borujerdi House.

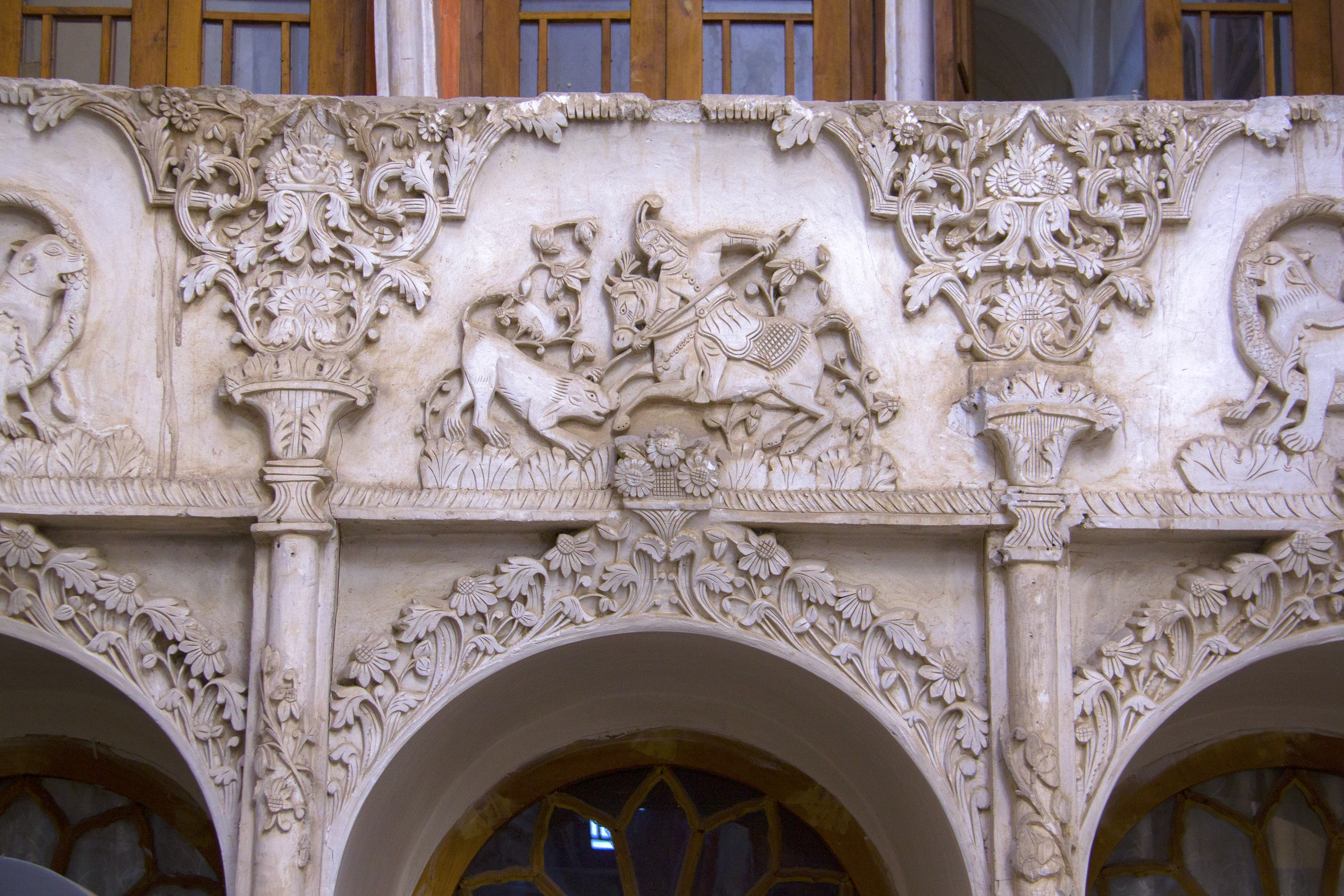
Detail of interior stucco at the Borujerdi House.

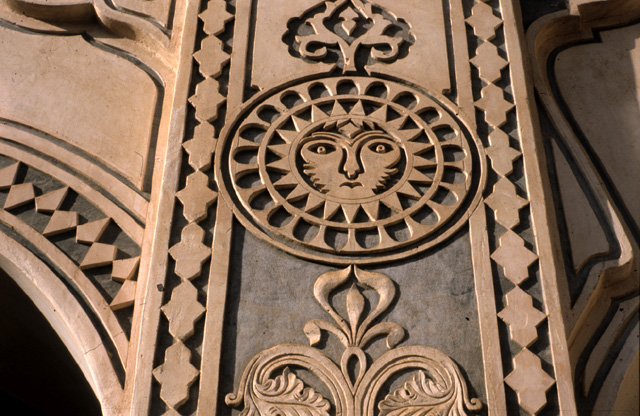
Detail of exterior stucco at the Borujerdi House.

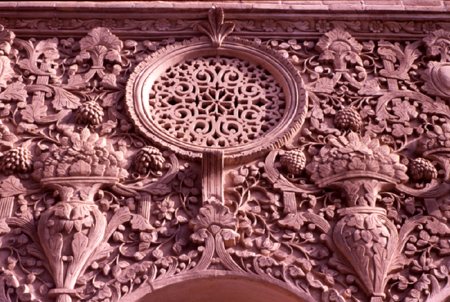
Detail of exterior stucco at the Borujerdi House.

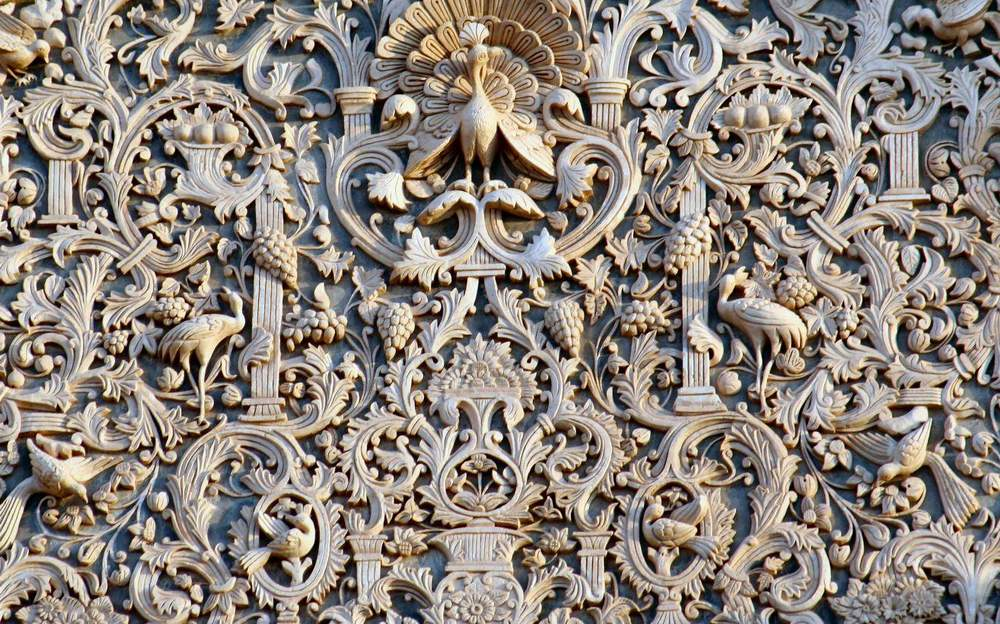
Detail of exterior stucco at the Borujerdi House.
