= Diaphragm arch =

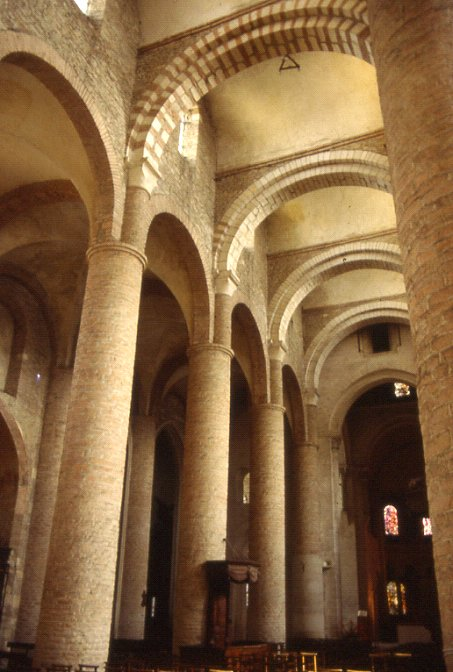
Diaphragm arches in Romanesque architecture (St Philibert, Tournus)

A diaphragm arch is a transverse wall-bearing arch forming a partial wall dividing a vault or a ceiling into compartments while also bracing the walls.

When used under a wooden roof (with solid spandrels) it has the advantage of providing a partial firebreak. It was first used in Roman Syria, during the 2nd century AD. The diaphragm arch is present in Islamic, Carolingian, Ottonian, Romanesque and Gothic architecture (a solution often employed in Catalan Gothic, for instance).

== See also ==
- Islamic architecture
- Romanesque architecture
- Kucheh

== Sources ==
- Hourihane, C. (2012). "Arch". The Grove Encyclopedia of Medieval Art and Architecture. Vol. 1. Oxford University Press. pp. 129–134. ISBN 978-0-19-539536-5.
