= Ustad Ali Maryam =

Iranian architect

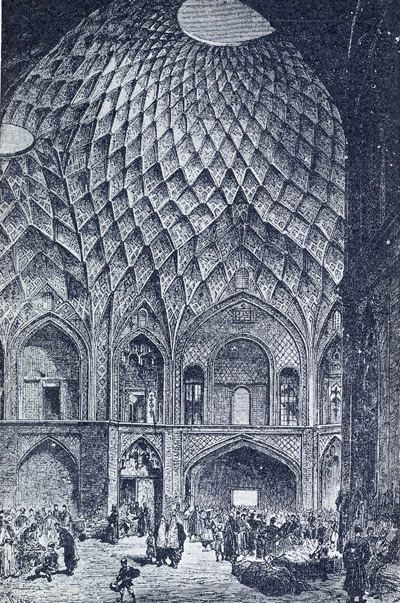
Drawing of Aminoddole Carvansarai

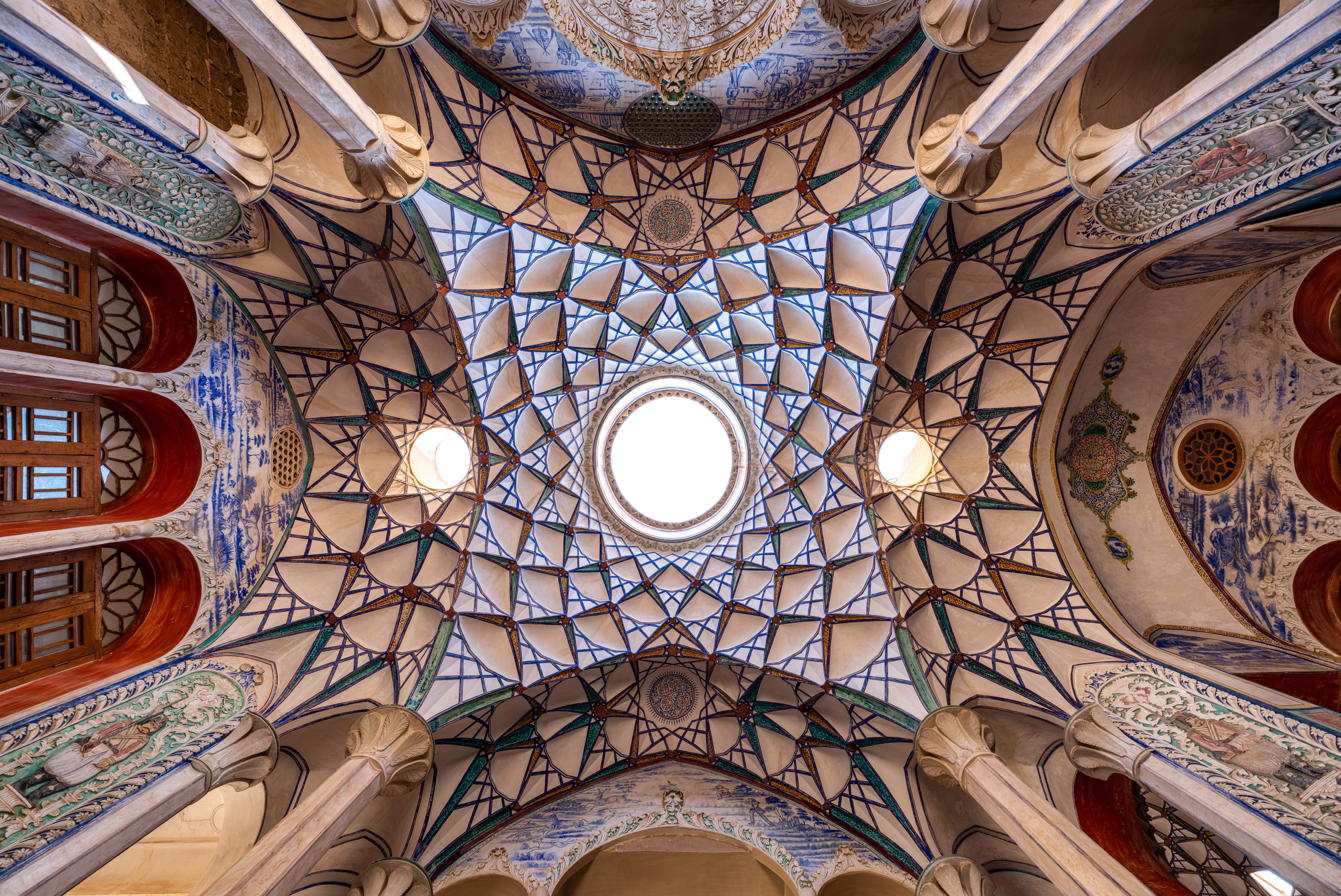
Ceiling of a room in Borujerdi House

Ustad Ali Maryam (Persian: استاد علی مریم) was an Iranian architect of the 19th century. He is known for designing three buildings in particular, all in Kashan:

- Borujerdi House (1857)
- Tabatabai House (1840s)
- Aminoddole Carvansarai (1863)

== See also ==
- Architects of Iran
