= Amin od-Dowleh Caravansarai =

Timcheh in the Bazaar of Kashan, Iran

Amin od-Dowleh plaza
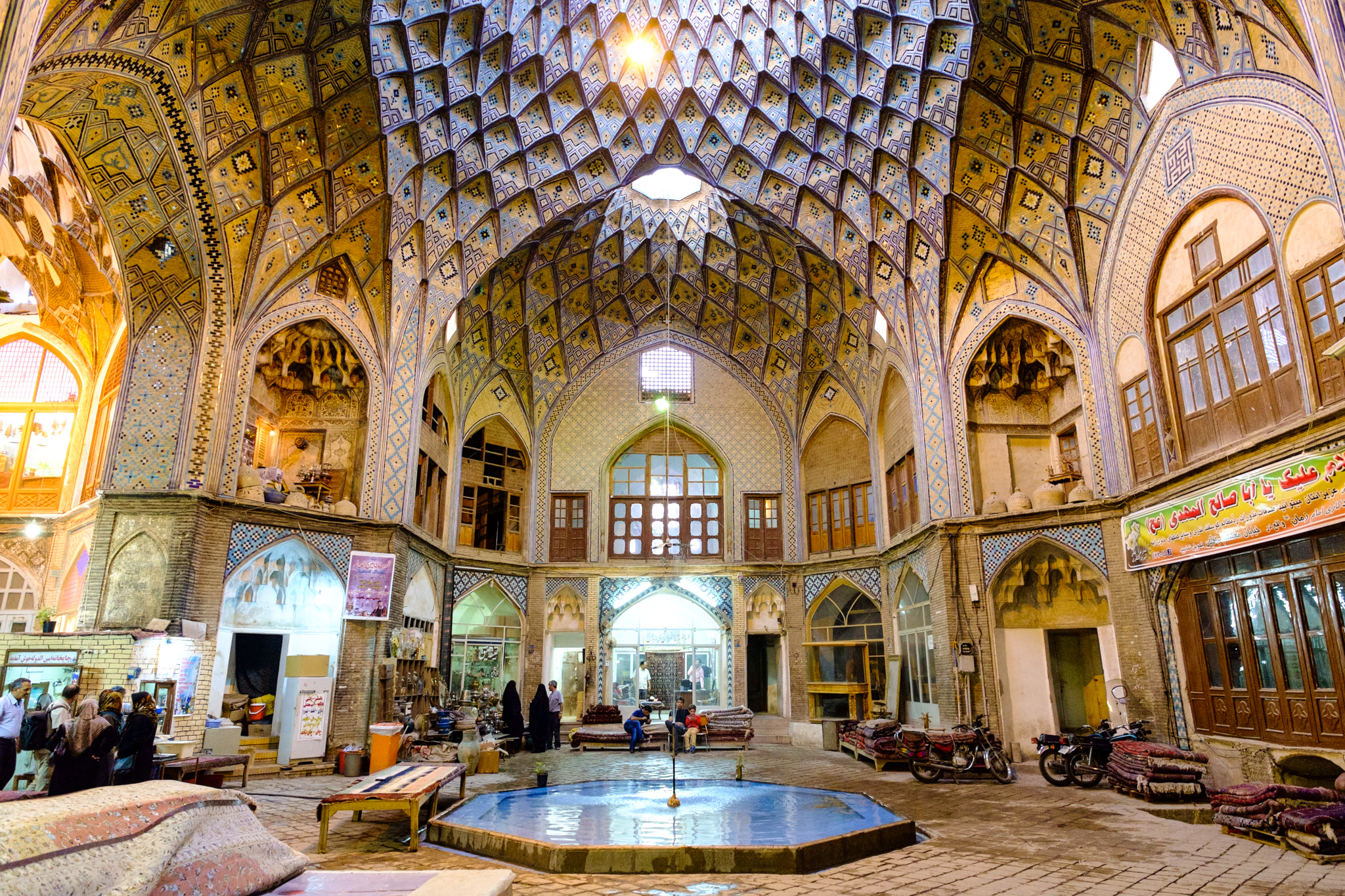
- Interactive map of the Amin od-Dowleh plaza area

General information
- Architectural style: Iranian architecture
- Location: Kashan, Iran
- Coordinates: 33.98421°N 51.44881°E

Design and construction
- Architect: Ustad Ali Maryam

Amin od-Dowleh Plaza (Persian: تیمچه امین الدوله) is one of several timchehs in the grand Bazaar of Kashan, Iran.

The plaza was designed primarily for commerce, but in recent times has been used for important religious ceremonies. The most important of these is Muharram, during which Hai'ats sing elegies in the plaza about tragic events which happened to Hussain, the third Shi'a Imam, and his close relatives in Karbala on the day of Ashura. It used to be an important place on the Silk Road. Its chambers traditionally served as a place for trading rugs woven, either woven in the city or imported. There are also some old antique shops and teahouses in the Timche plaza.

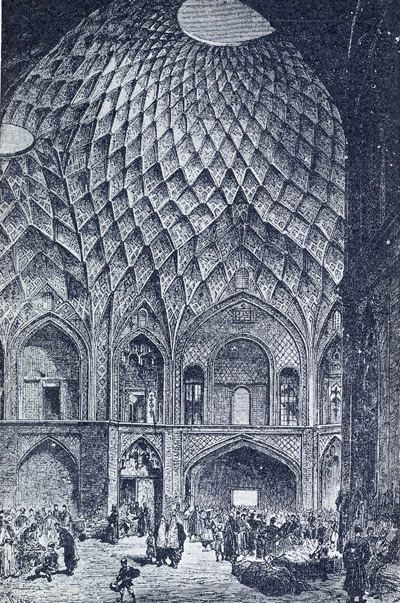
Rendering of Timcheh-ye Amin od-Dowleh, built by Ustad Ali Maryam.
