= Timcheh =

Traditional Iranian architectural element

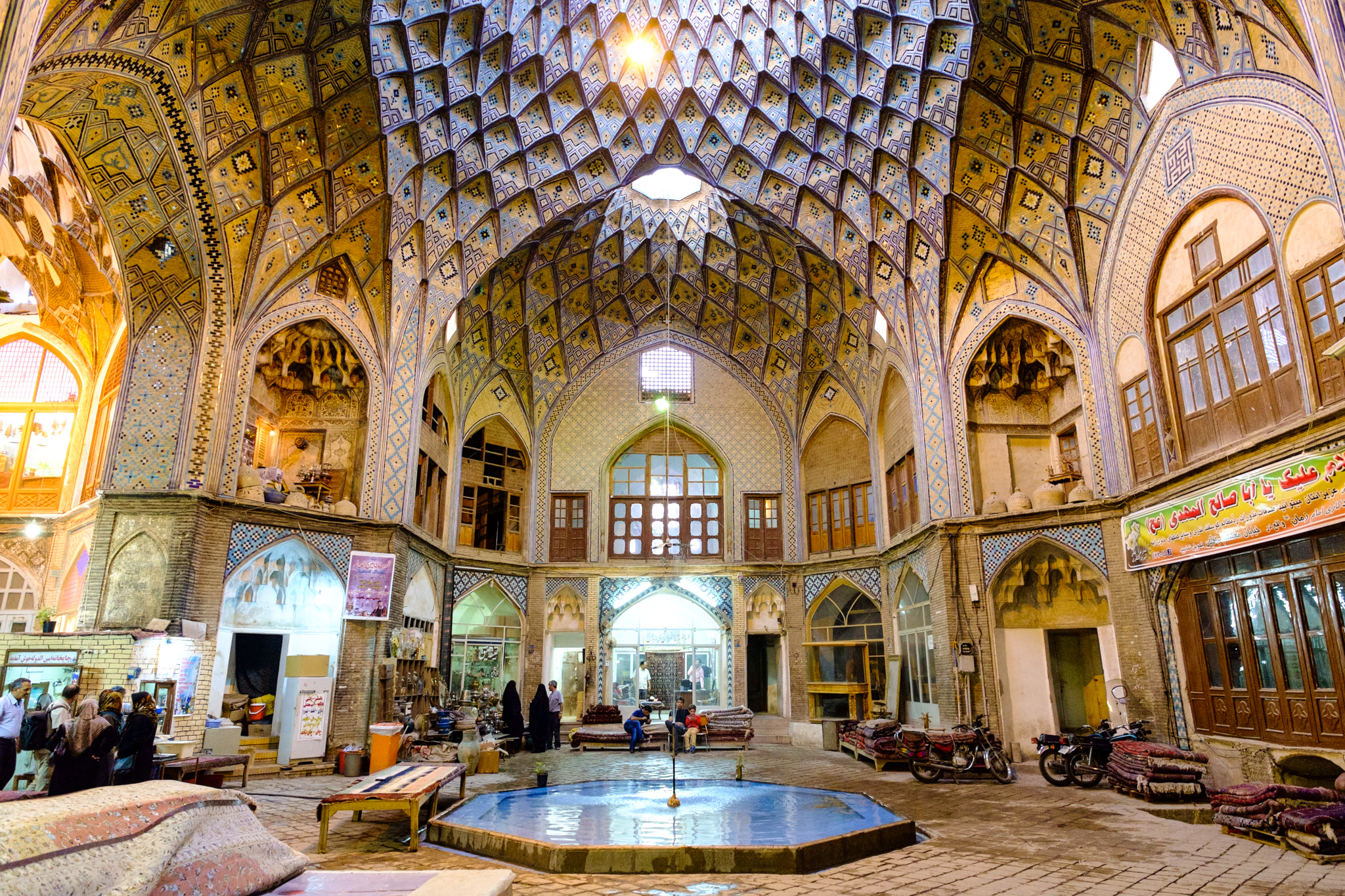
Interior of Timcheh-ye Amin od-Dowleh in Kashan

A timcheh (Persian: تیمچه) is a small vaulted section of a traditional Iranian bazaar, architecturally resembling the main bazaar corridor but built on a smaller scale. Typically, one end of a timcheh connects to the main bazaar route, while the other opens into a caravanserai or a loading courtyard. Timchehs are usually covered with a dome or vault, feature a central pool, and are surrounded by two or three floors of rooms or hojrehs, each belonging to an individual merchant. Functionally, a timcheh serves as a compact commercial hub, often specializing in a particular trade or type of goods.

== Etymology ==
The word timcheh is derived from the prefix tim, likely referring to a caravanserai, and the suffix -cheh, a Persian diminutive. Thus, timcheh can be interpreted as "a small caravanserai".

== Architecture ==
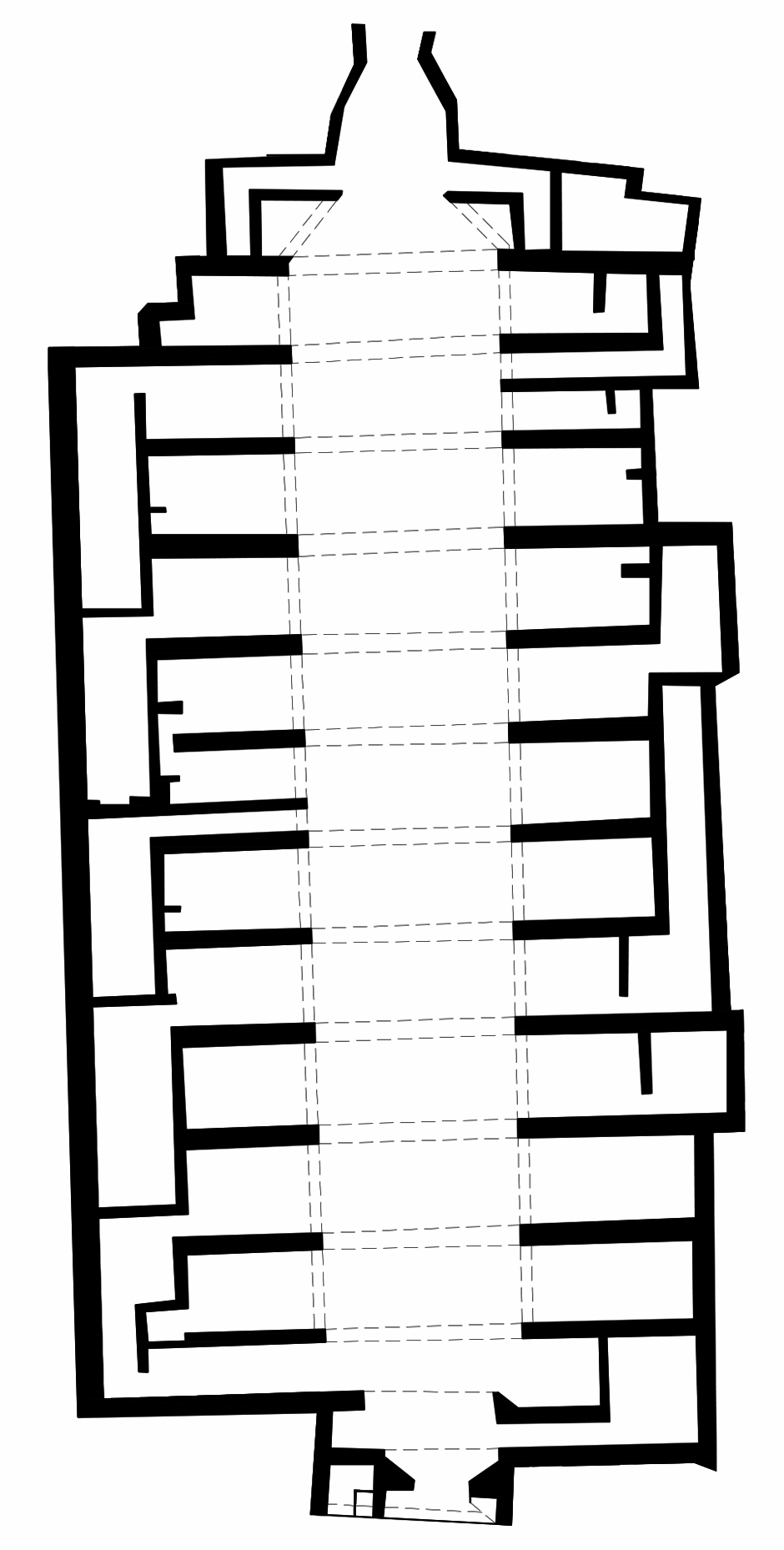
Map of the Timcheh-ye Mozaffariyeh in Tabriz

Timchehs share architectural features with the main bazaar passages but are built on a smaller scale. Most are roofed; those without a dome are often evolved forms of earlier caravanserais from the Safavid era, some of which were later vaulted. The ceiling of a timcheh often includes a large central dome adorned with tilework, stucco decorations, and wooden carvings. A typical layout consists of a central pool surrounded by merchant rooms (hojrehs) in two or three levels. These structures often exhibit geometric layouts such as squares, rectangles, circles, ovals, or even hexagons and octagons. Brick is the most common construction material.

== Function ==
A timcheh functions as a smaller bazaar within the larger commercial complex, and often hosts leading merchants and wholesalers. Each room typically belongs to one trader and may be identified by the name of that merchant (e.g., "Hojreh-ye X"). Timchehs often become centers for specific industries or trades, such as textiles, carpets, or precious metals.

== Notable examples ==
Prominent examples of timchehs in Iran include:

- Timcheh-ye Mozaffariyeh in Tabriz
- Timcheh-ye Hajeb od-Dowleh in Tehran
- Timcheh-ye Amin od-Dowleh in Kashan

== See also ==
- List of nationally registered timchehs in Iran (in Persian)
