= Tabatabai House =

Historic site in Kashan, Iran

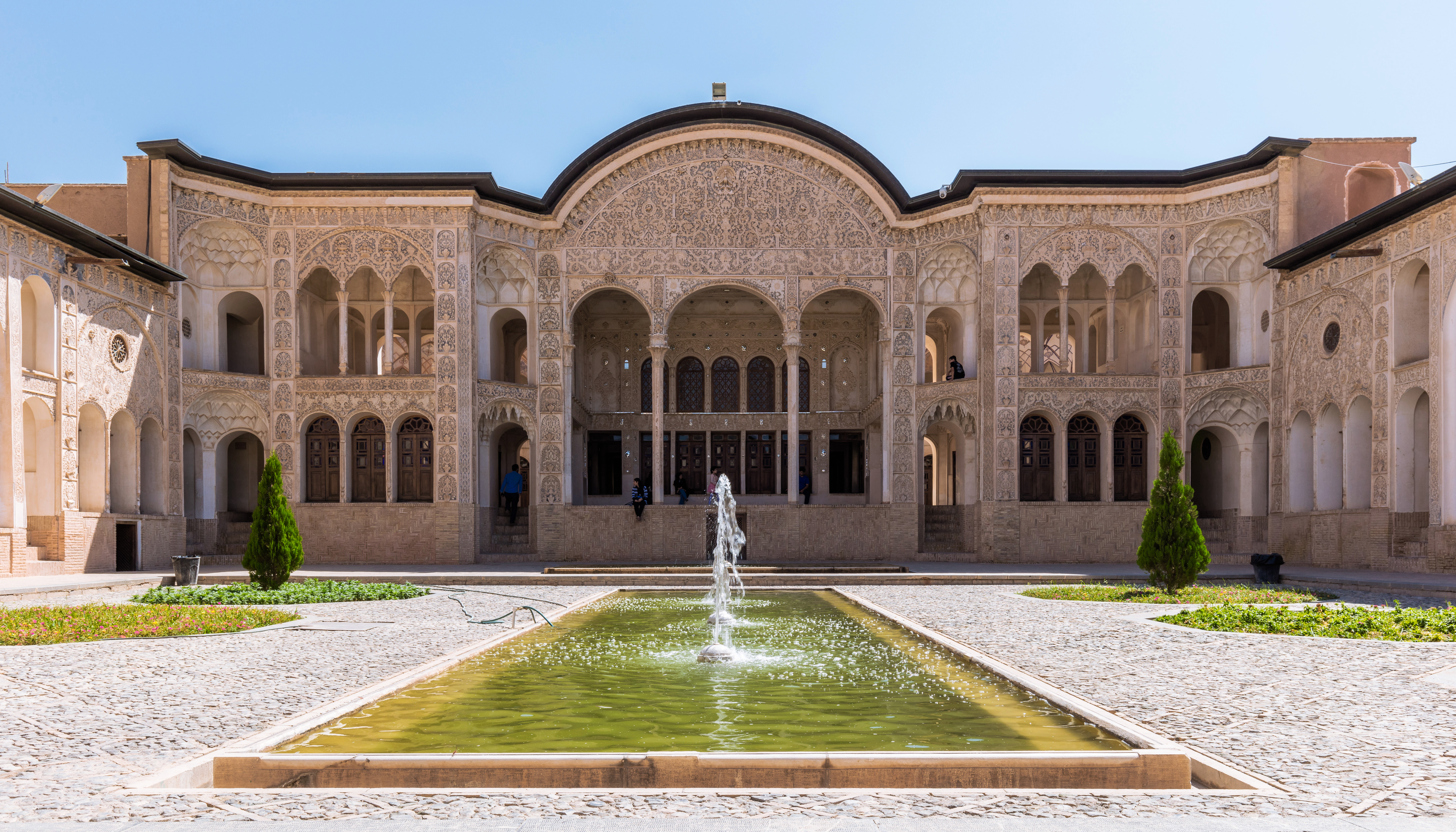

General information
- Architectural style: Qajar style
- Location: Kashan, Isfahan province, Iran
- Coordinates: 33.9748°N 51.4391°E

The Tabatabai House (Persian: خانه طباطبایی‌ها) is a historic house museum in Kashan, Iran. It was built around 1880 in the Qajar era, during the reign of Naser al-Din Shah Qajar, for the affluent Tabātabāei family. It is one of the prominent historic houses of Kashan and Iran, together with the Āmeri House, the Borujerdi House, and others.

== Architecture ==
The Tabātabāei House was designed by Ustad Ali Maryam, who later designed the nearby Borujerdi House, and it has been restored. It covers nearly 5,000 square meters and includes 40 rooms, four courtyards, four basements, three windcatchers, and gardens. It consists of the biruni ("exterior", the public area) and andaruni ("interior", the private quarters) features of Iran's traditional residential architecture, and is decorated with stone reliefs, stucco, and stained glass.

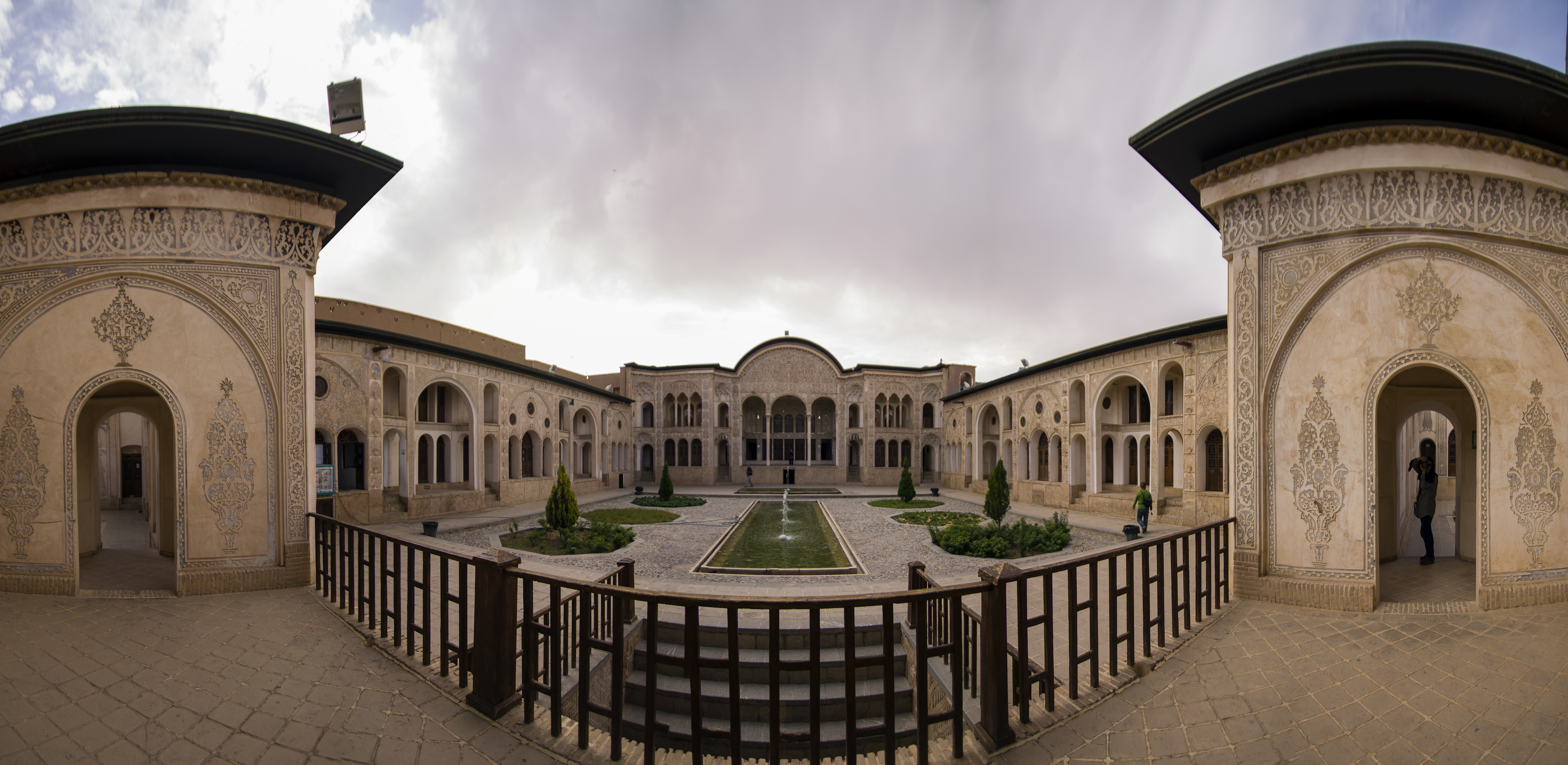
A panoramic view of the courtyard of the Tabātabāei House from one of its balconies.

== Gallery ==
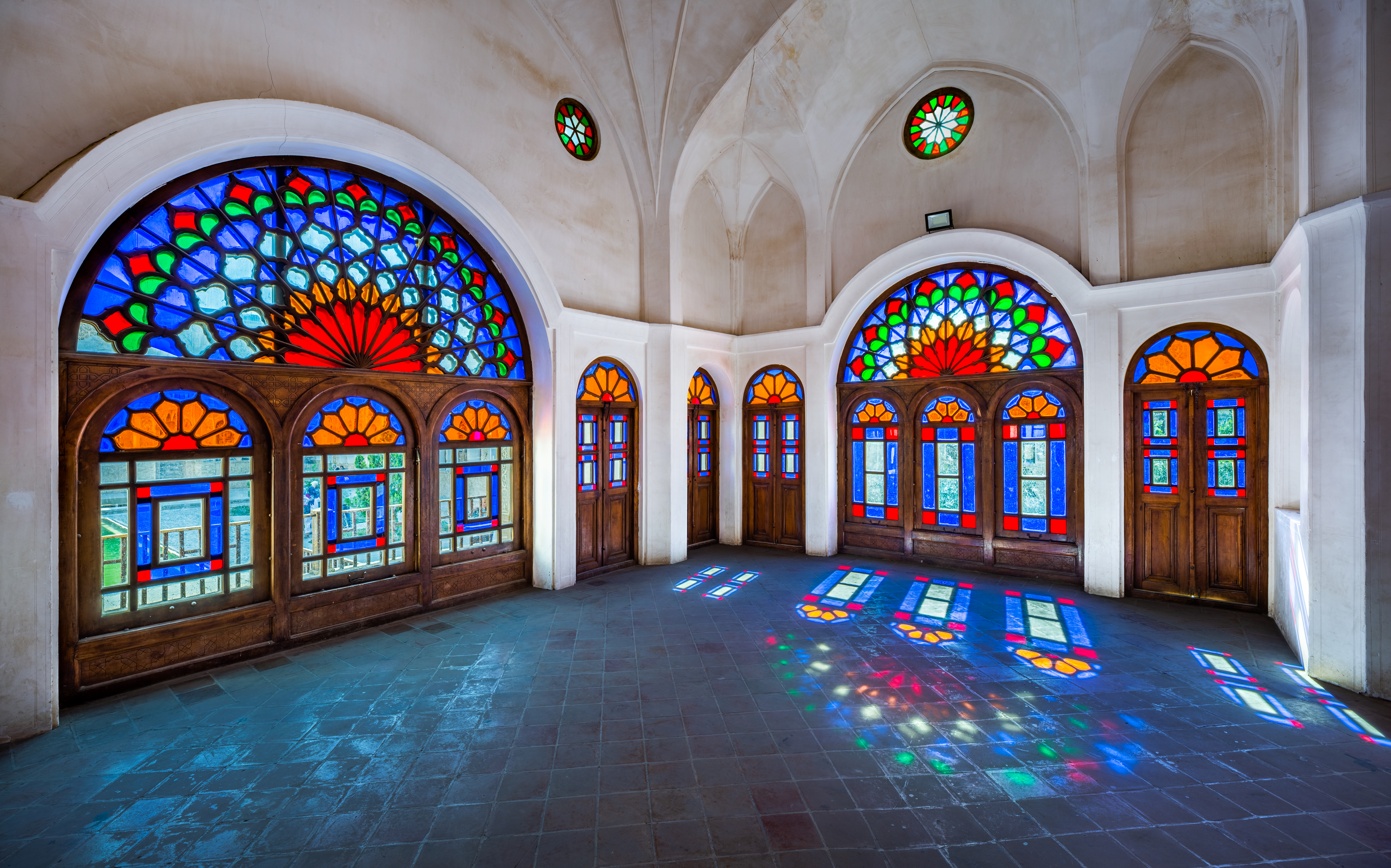
A view of interior room of the Tabātabāei House.

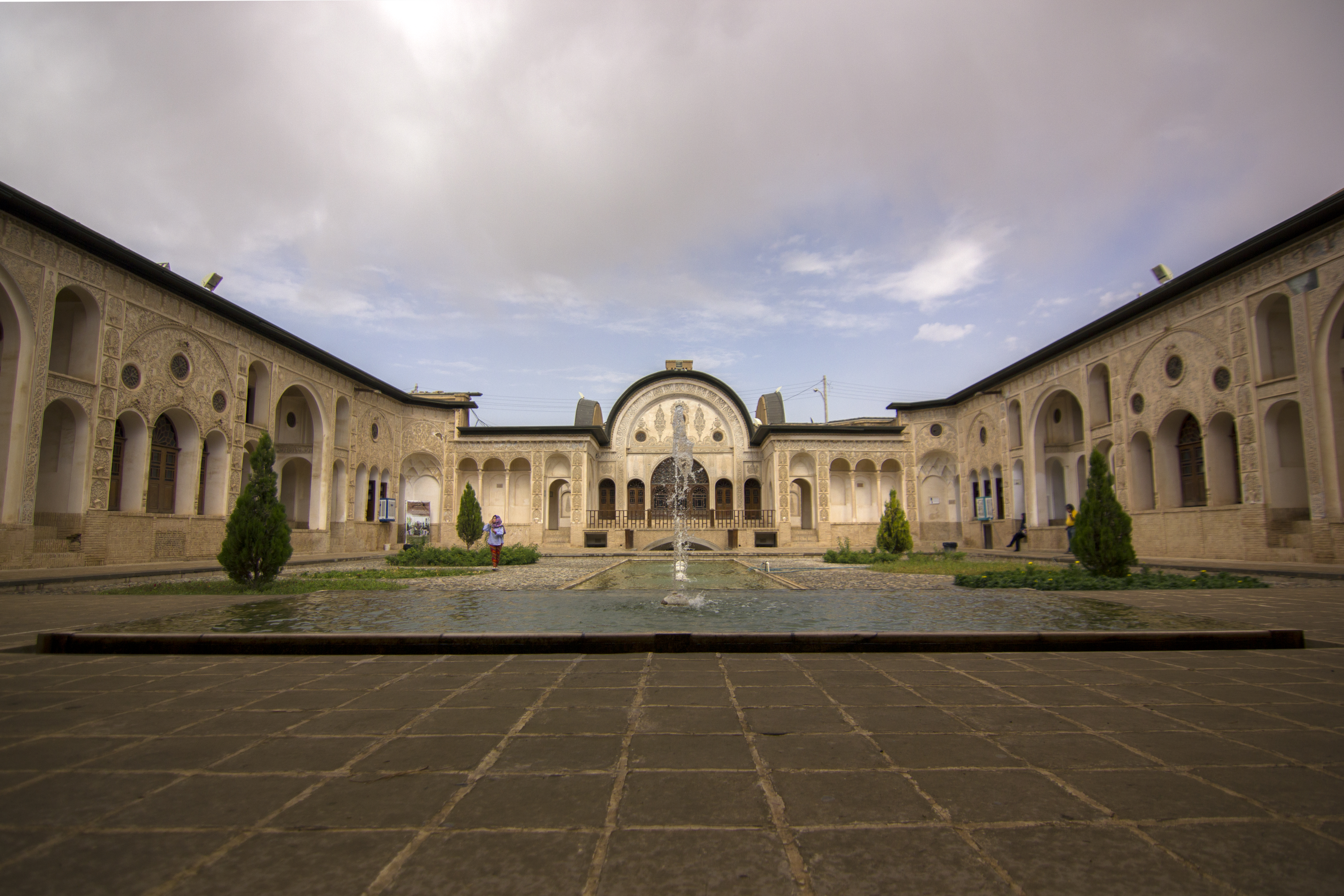
A view of the courtyard of the Tabātabāei House.

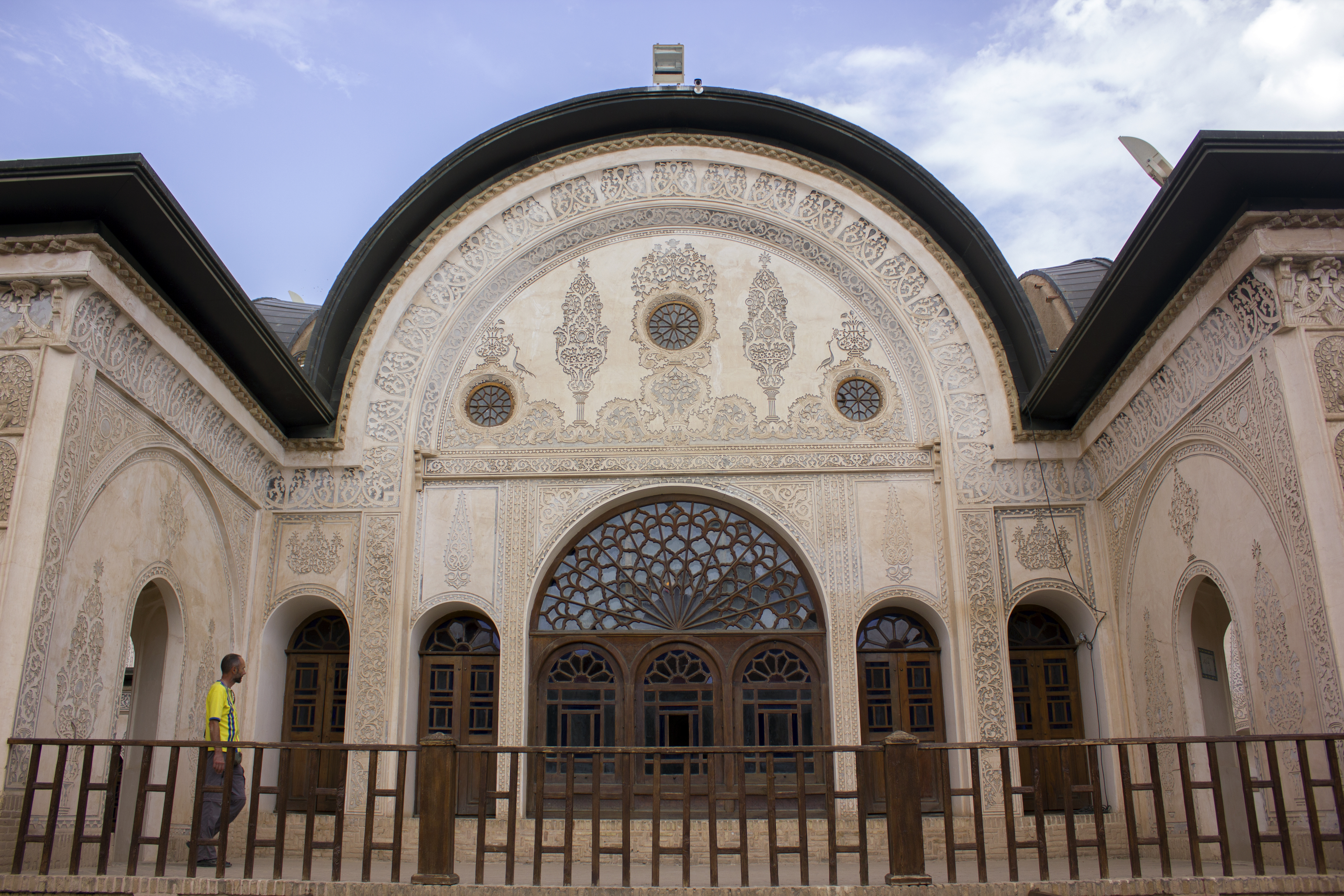
A balcony in the Tabātabāei House.

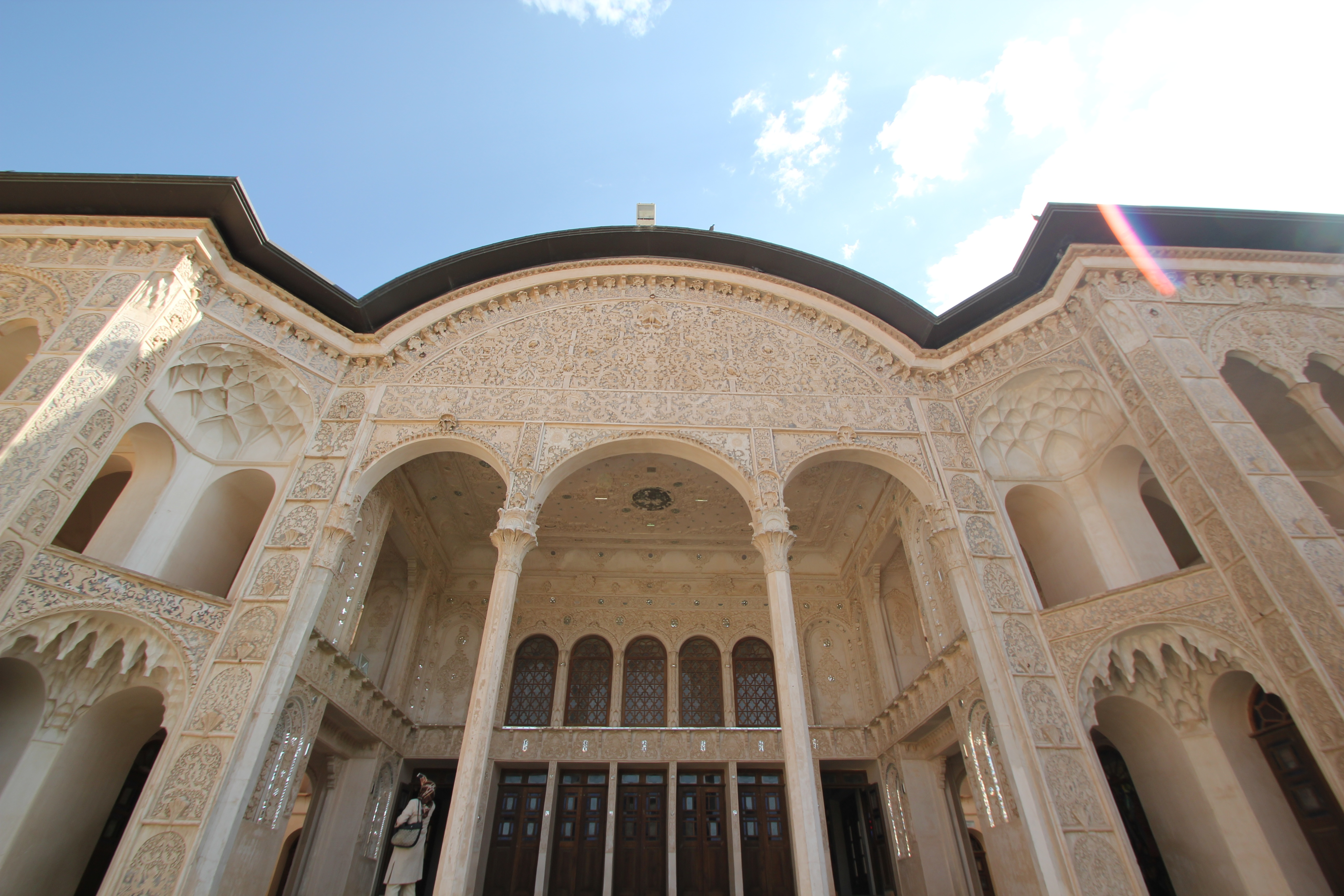
A balcony in the Tabātabāei House.

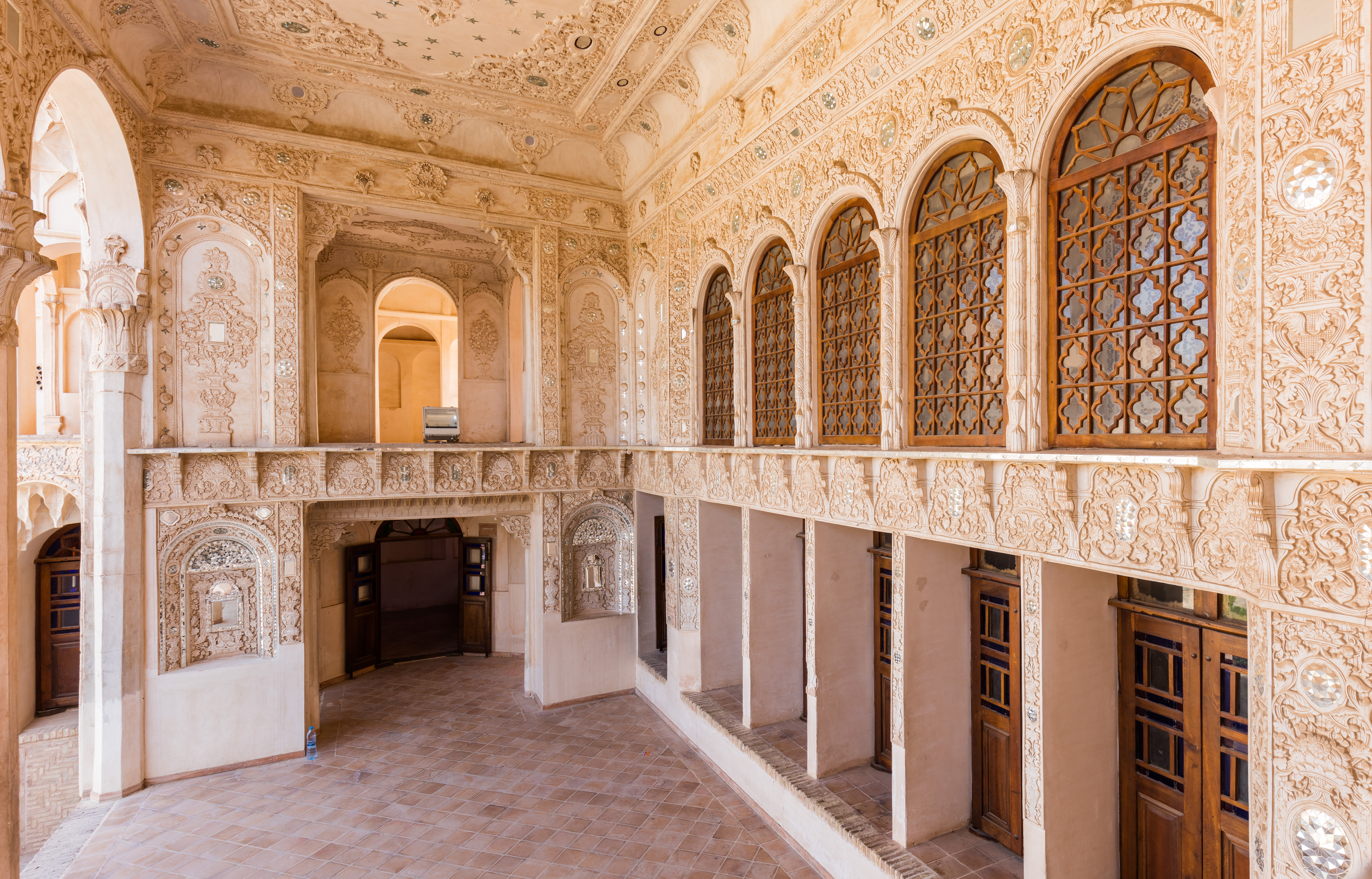
Inside a balcony in the Tabātabāei House.

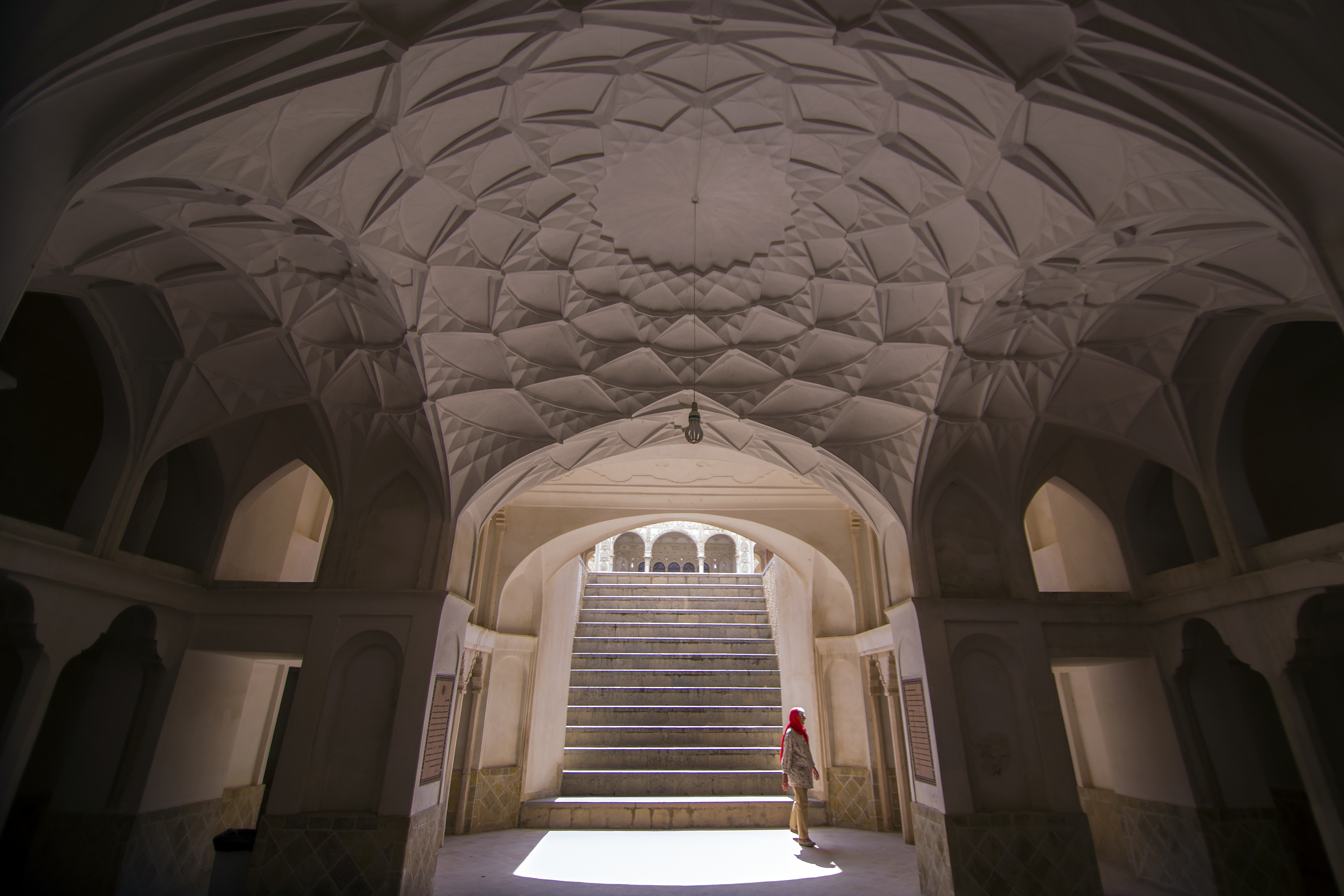
A room inside the Tabātabāei House.

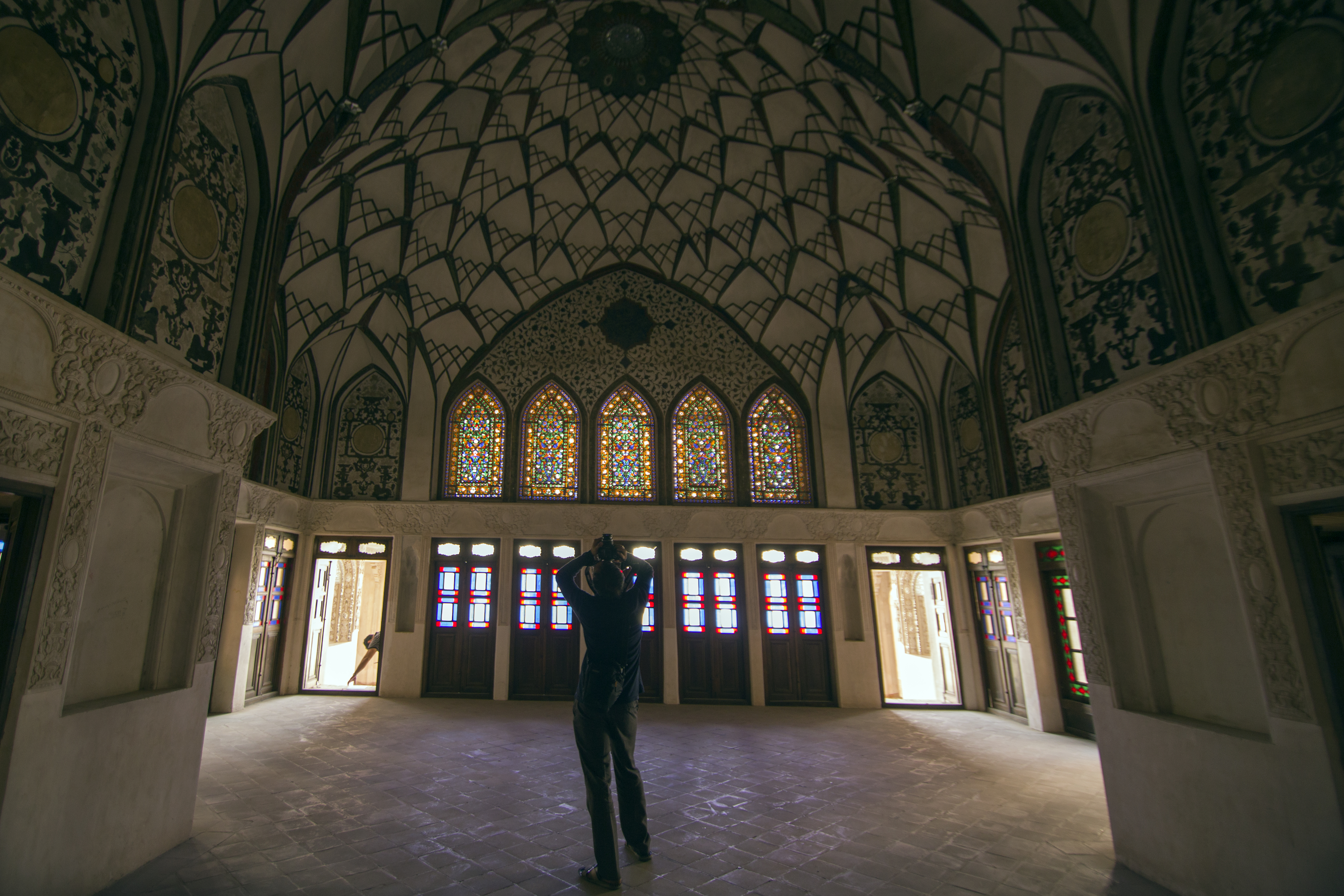
A room inside the Tabātabāei House.

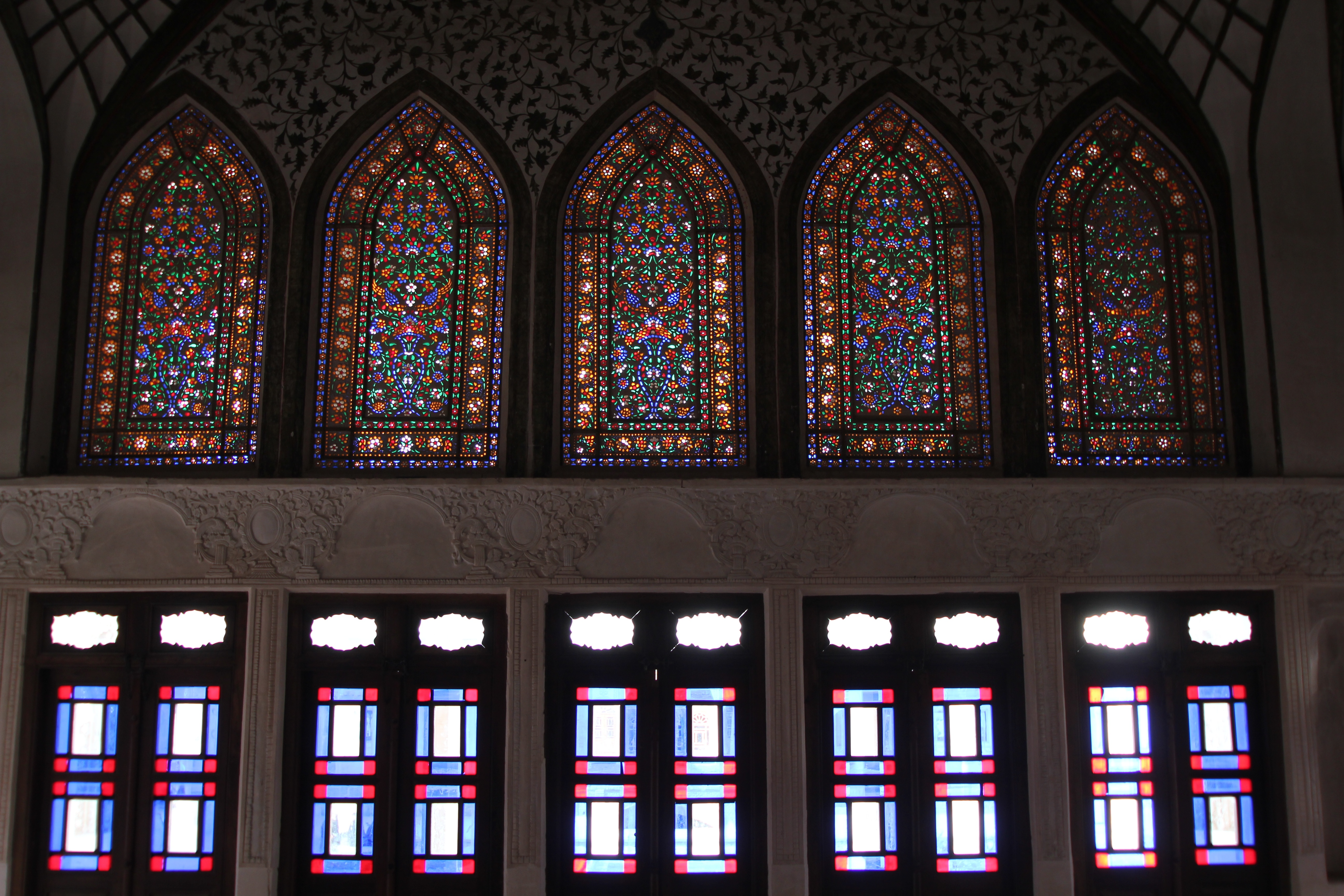
Iranian stained glass designs inside the Tabātabāei House.

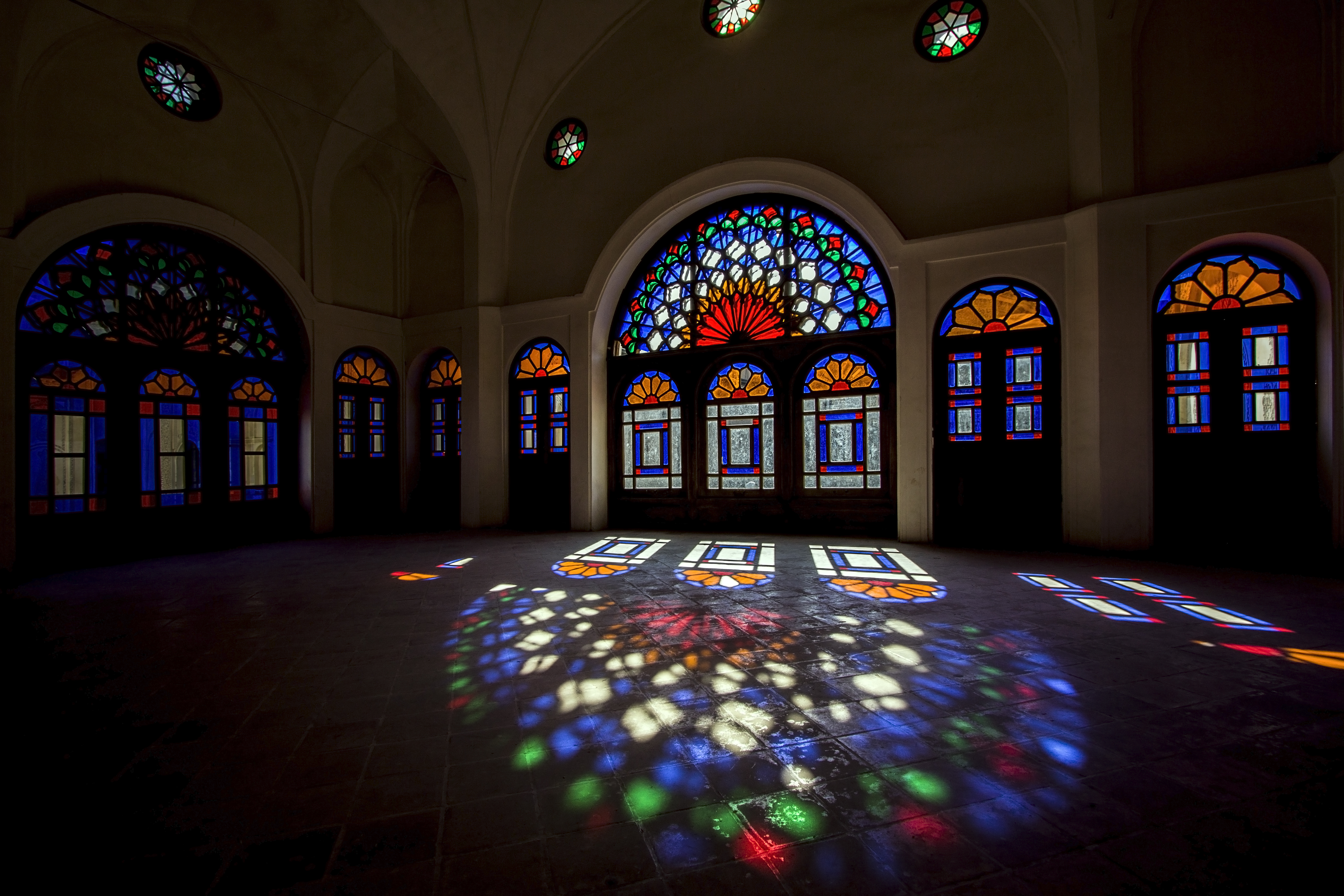
Iranian stained glass designs inside the Tabātabāei House.

== See also ==
- Iranian architecture
