= Bazaar of Kashan =

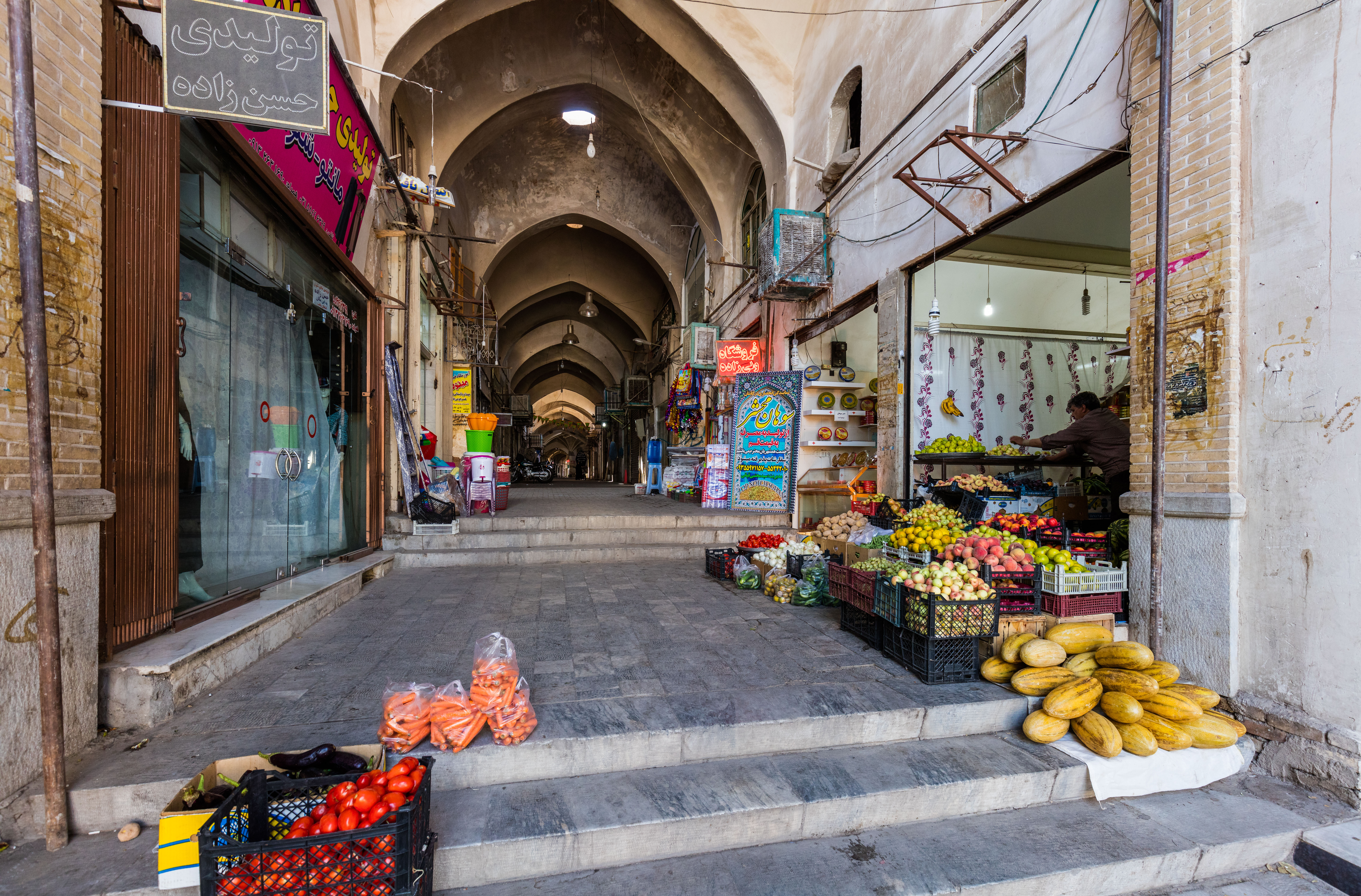

General information
- Type: Bazaar
- Location: Kashan, Isfahan province, Iran
- Coordinates: 33°59′6″N 51°26′57″E

The Bazaar of Kashan (Persian: بازار کاشان Bāzār-e Kāshān) is a bazaar in the center of the city of Kashan, Iran. It is thought to have been built in the Seljuk era with renovations during the Safavid period. The bazaar is located in between the middle of Baba-Afzal Street and Darvazeh-Dowlat district.

Like all other bazaars in Iran, it is a main center for storing goods and for economic exchanges. The bazaar complex houses several mosques, tombs, the Amin od-Dowleh Caravansarai, arcades, baths, and water reservoirs, built up in different periods.
