= Tiznoo House =

Tizno House
- خانه تیزنو (Persian); تیزنو (Persian)
- Interactive map of Tizno House

History
- Built for: Qajar dynasty
- Rebuilt: 2002 (۱۳۸۱ shamsi date )

Site notes
- Owner: Cultural Heritage, Handicrafts and Tourism Organization of Iran

Tizno House is one of the oldest houses in the city of Dezful. The house is numbered 2573 in the National Iranian Art Series, and is one of the largest and most beautiful houses in the Quay neighborhood, which, in terms of architectural style, has all the features of the Dezful House. This structure has expanded on the eastern side of the main square of Qaleh Dezful's neighborhood and is compatible with the ecosystem and the city's lifestyle. The structure of the house dates to the Safavid era and has undergone many changes during the Qajar era. This house has eight entrances, a central porch, rooms on the porches, a slope of the living room, a chamber or a swaddling room, and a beautiful bricks of freezing and bleeding.

== The outer space of the house ==
The main interior of the house is introspective and has a main porch on the ground floor and two porches on the first floor. The flooring of the yard is made using bricks with dimensions of 20,20,3. The building has two floors and the ground floor is 4 steps above the courtyard. In front of the main porch and ground floor rooms.

== Naming home ==
The historic house is named Tisno after its owner.

== Current application ==
The Tizno House is currently being renovated and used as Dezfoul's Cultural Heritage Office, and is considered one of Dezful's attractions.

== See also ==
- Cultural Heritage, Handicrafts and Tourism Organization of Iran
