= Kucheh =

Architectural feature in traditional Persian architecture

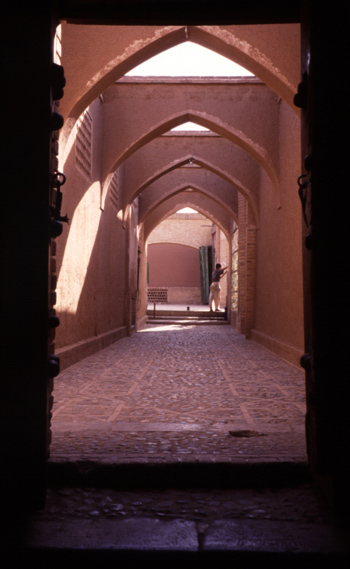
A Kucheh in Kashan. Photo was taken from entrance to Tabatabai House looking outside into the Kucheh.

In traditional Persian architecture, a kucheh or koocheh (Persian: کوچه), is a narrow especially designed alley. Remnants of it are still seen in modern Iran and regional countries.

Before modernisation, Iran's old city fabric was composed of these narrow winding streets, often made with high walls of adobe and brick, and often roofed at intervals. This form of urban design, which was commonplace in Iran, is an optimal form of desert architecture that minimizes desert expansion and the effects of dust storms. It also maximises daytime shading, and insulates the “fabric” from severe winter temperatures.

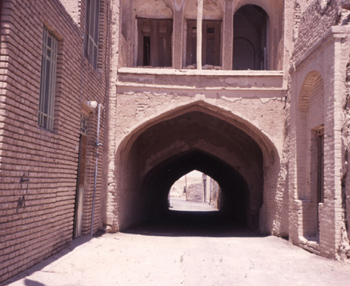
An example of how Kuchehs were roofed. Sometimes, such as in Isfahan, the kucheh was roofed for much of its span. This example is in Nain.

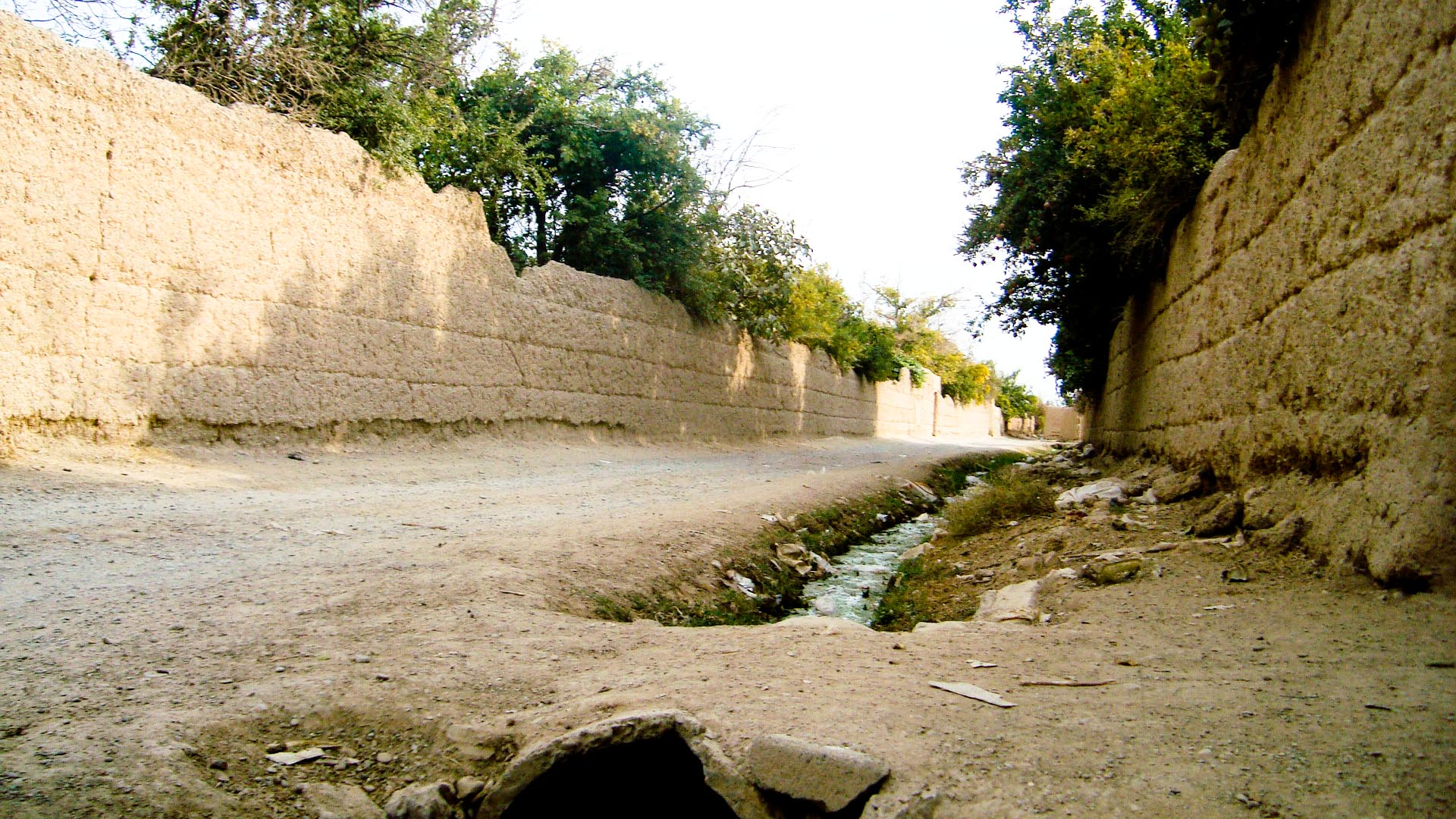
A Kuche-Bagh (Kucheh + garden) in Najafabad.

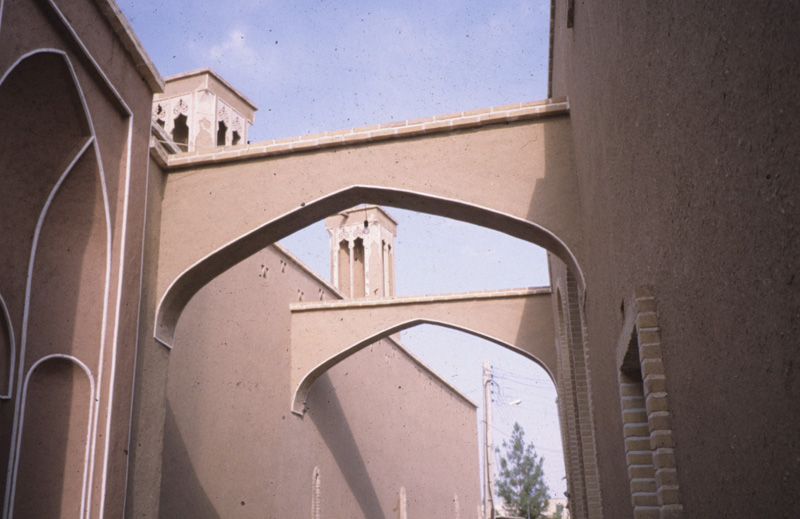
The high walls of the Koocheh provided relief from dust storms and intense sunlight. This was an efficient and ancient form of urban design in Iran.

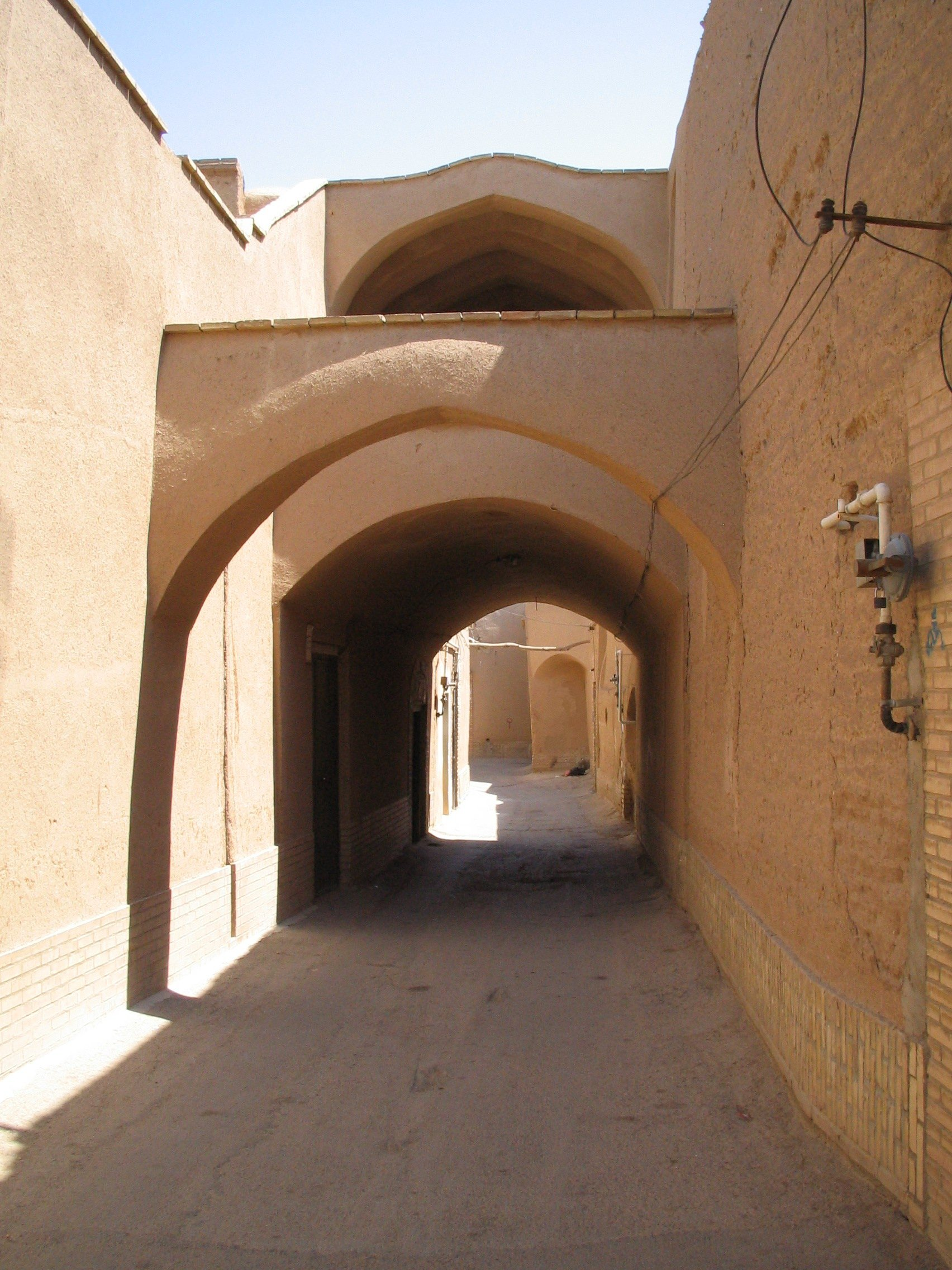
A Kucheh in Yazd
