= Talar =

Columned hall or porch in Iranian architecture

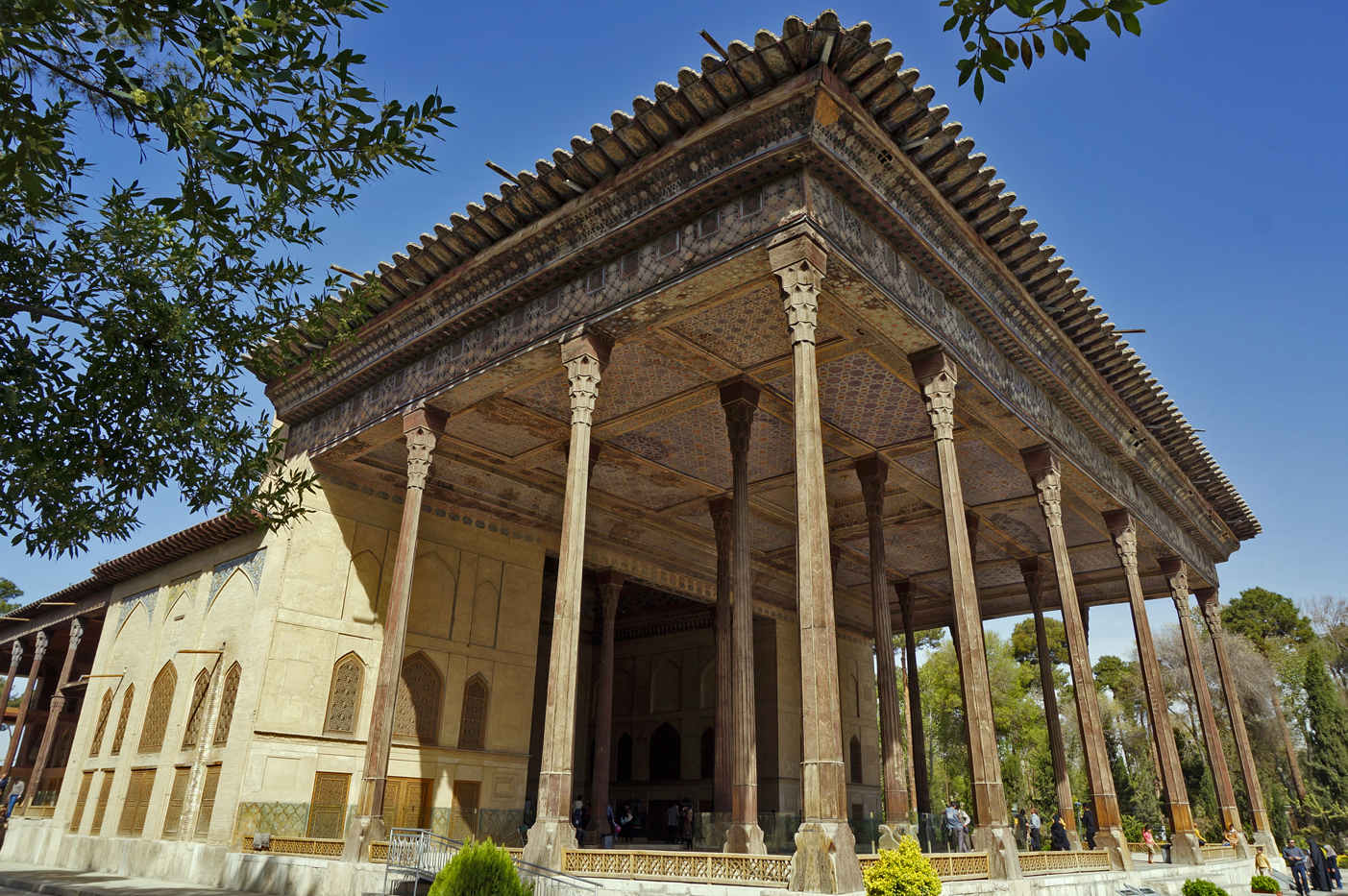
The talar of the Chehel Sotoun palace in Isfahan

A talar or talaar (Persian: تالار) is a type of porch or hall in Iranian architecture. It generally refers to a porch fronting a building, supported by columns, and open on one or three sides. The term is also applied more widely to denote a throne hall or audience hall with some of these features.

== History ==
The columned hall or porch has its roots in ancient Persia, as seen in the Achaemenid palace in Persepolis, as well as in Greco-Roman houses and possibly even in the tents of Central Asian nomads who moved into Iran over the centuries. The talar can also refer to the representation of a throne carved on the rock-cut tomb of Darius at Naqsh-e Rostam, near Persepolis, and above the portico which was copied from his palace.

The talar was revived in Iranian architecture under Abbas the Great (r. 1588–1629) during the Safavid era. Safavid architects appropriated the idea of a columned hall from Achaemenid examples and used it in the design of new royal palaces and pavilions, most notably the Ali Qapu and Chehel Sotoun palaces in Isfahan during the 17th century. In these examples, the talar is open on three sides.

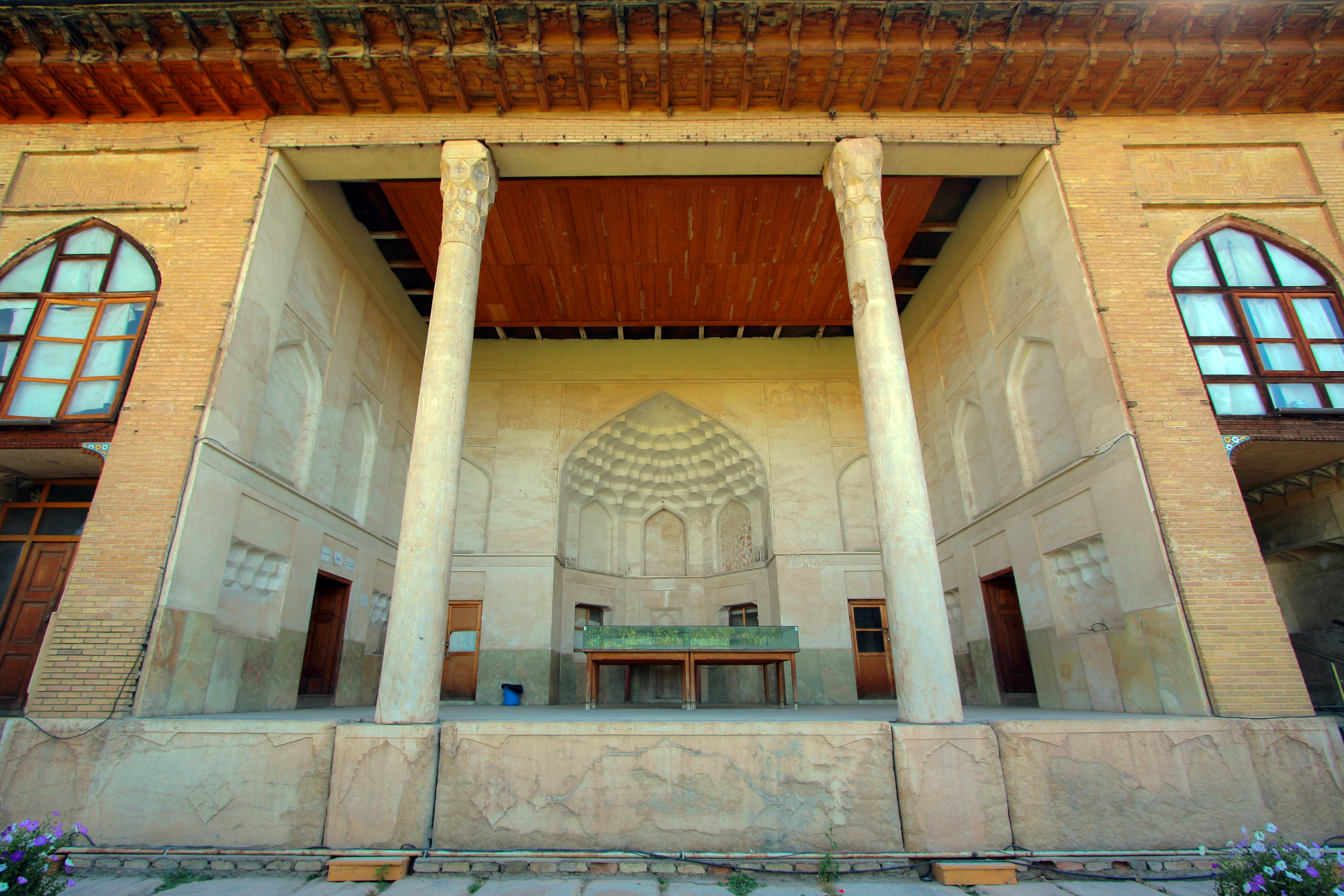
One of the talars of the Arg of Karim Khan in Shiraz

Karim Khan Zand, the ruler of Shiraz in the mid-18th century, borrowed from Safavid models and employed this feature in new ways for the design of his own palaces in Shiraz. Here, the talar was combined with an iwan (vaulted hall open to one side) to form pillared halls opening onto a courtyard on one side.

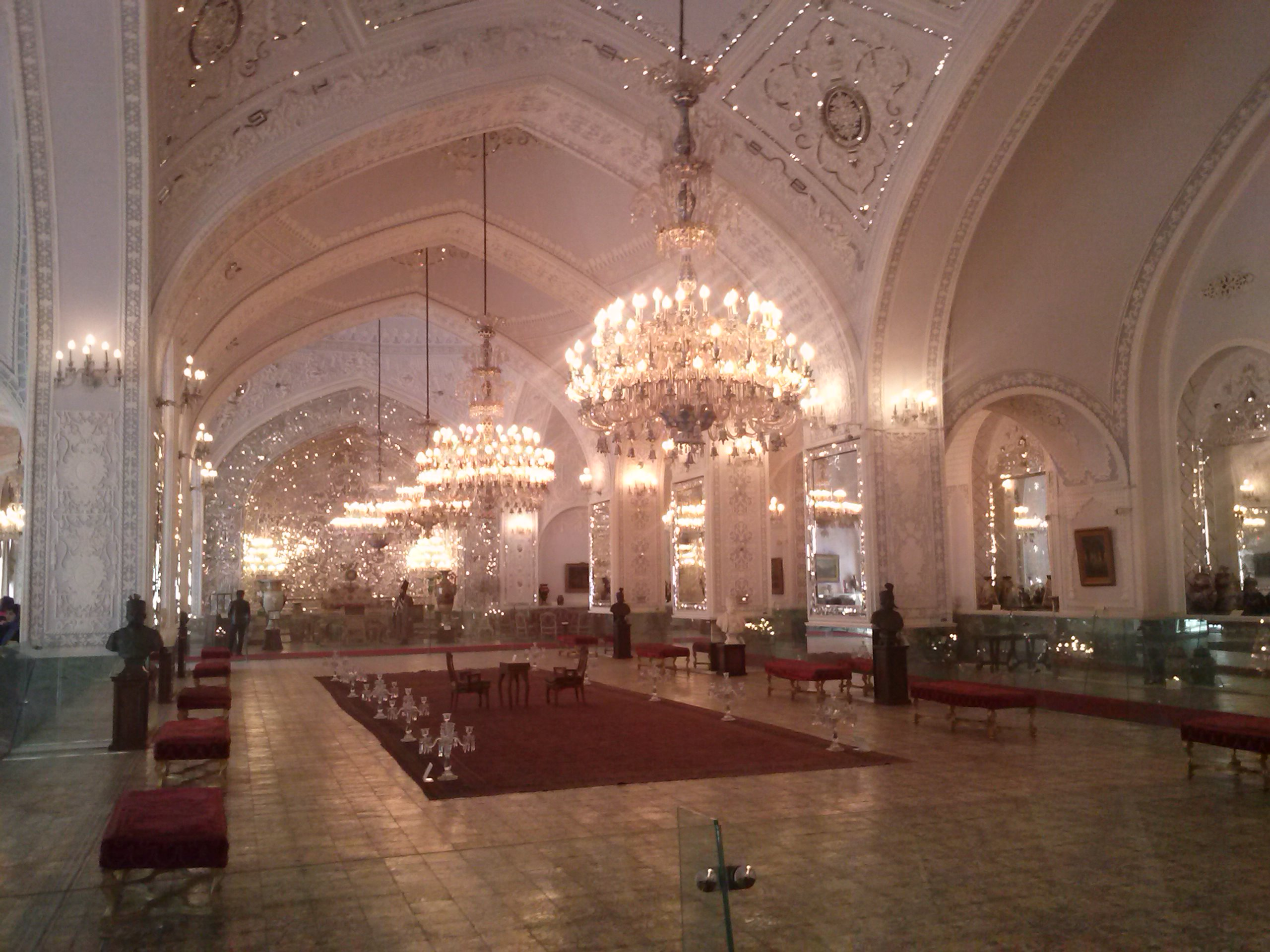
Talar-e Salam (Salute Hall) of Golestan Palace in Tehran

Under the Qajar dynasty, which eventually captured Shiraz and reunified Iran at the end of the 18th century, this feature was imported to the new royal palaces in Tehran. Under the Qajars, a talar could refer to a relatively simple hall open on one side with columns, such as the Talar e-Marmar (containing the Takht-e Marmar, the Marble Throne) built by Fath Ali Shah in the Golestan Palace in the 19th century. The talar continued to be a popular design feature of aristocratic houses and pavilions in Shiraz, such as those of the Qavam family. It was even employed during the early 20th century, under the Pahlavi dynasty, as part of the Persian revivalist trends in architecture during this time.

== Description ==
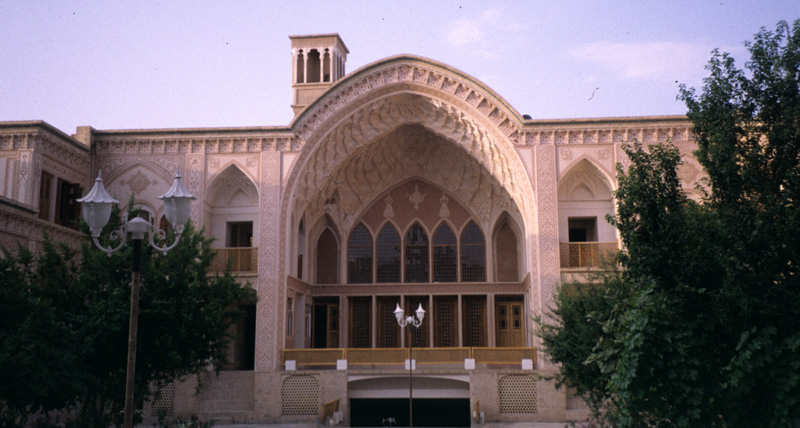
A 19th century Talar would be centrally situated, often under the main Iwan, where evening services would be performed for members of the andaruni. Image is of Amerian House in Kashan.

In ancient times, as depicted in the sculptured façade of the tomb of Darius at Persepolis show, the talar had three tiers, with Atlant statues upholding each. This design typified the subject-people of the monarch.

The talar built by the Qajar dynasty as part of the Golestan Palace is a spacious chamber with flat ceiling decorated with mirror panels. The walls are also decorated with mirror work called Ayeneh-kari, which produced numerous angles and coruscations.

== See also ==
- Iranian architecture
