= Andaruni =

Inner quarters where women lived in traditional Iranian architecture

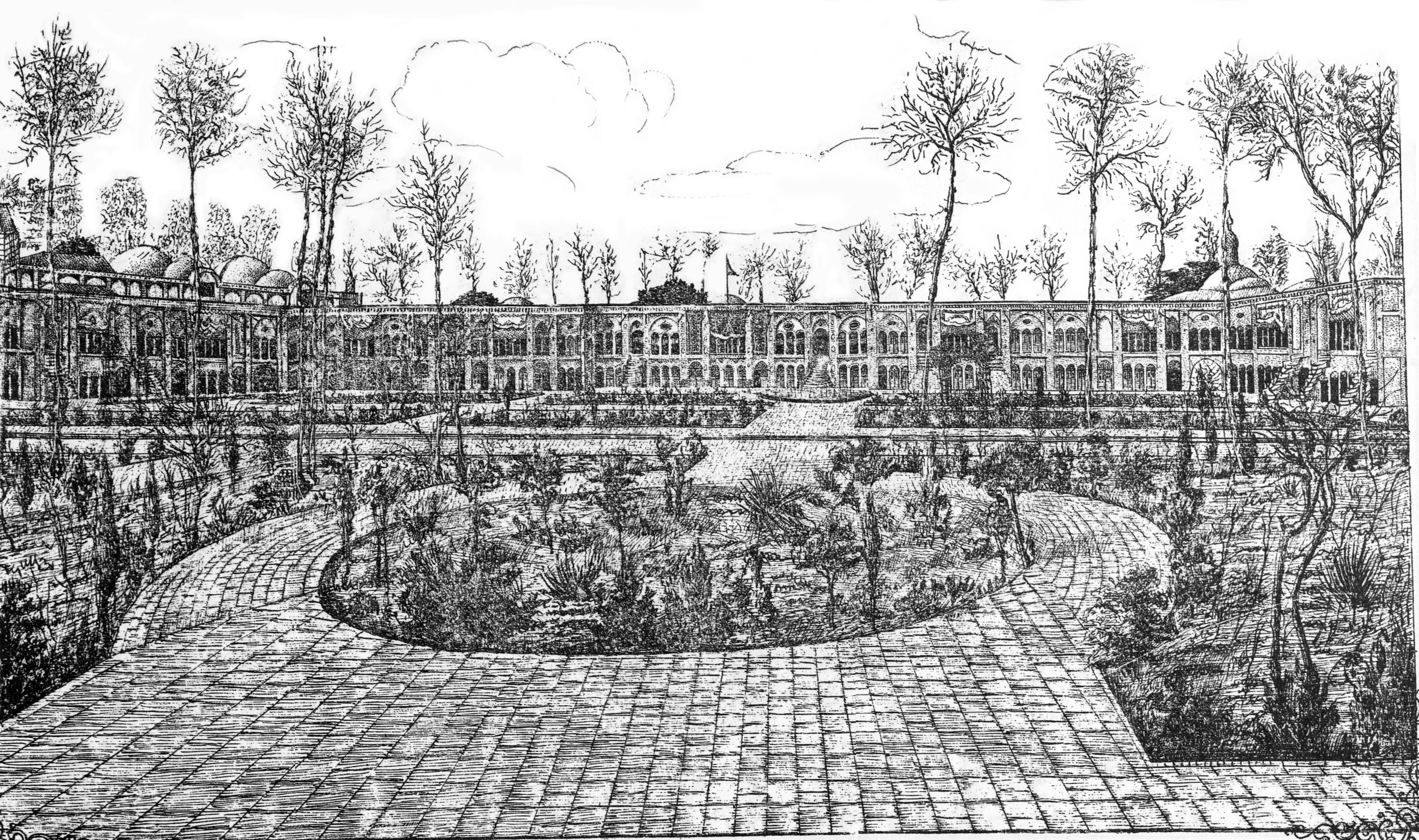
Andaruni of Golestan Palace in Tehran, by Abu Torab Ghaffari, 1882

Andaruni (Persian: اندرونی) in Iranian architecture, is the inner quarter where the women lived.

== Private space ==
In traditional Persian residential architecture the andaruni is a part of the house in which the private quarters are established. This is specifically where the women of the house are free to move about without being seen by an outsider (na mahram). This is also the place where women can interact with their kin (maharim) without following the dress code or without wearing the hijab.

In case the patriarch of the house had more than one wife, each wife is given her own section in the andaruni as is the case for her mother-in-law or sister-in-law if they live with the family. The only men allowed in this area are those directly related to the lord of the house (his sons) and the lord himself, which may include boys under the age of puberty, and guests allowed in under special circumstances.

The court (usually in the talar) of the house would usually be situated in the andaruni.

== Dichotomy ==
Andaruni's equivalent space for men is called biruni. These two sections, which are both built around a garden, are part of the so-called interior-exterior dichotomy of Persian houses, which denotes the spatial divide between andaruni and biruni segment. The former is the private space while the latter represents the public quarter as it is also the place where business and ceremonies are conducted. Messengers, who are usually young boys, are employed in the interaction between the two quarters.

== See also ==
- Women-only space
- Zenana
