= Architects of Iran =

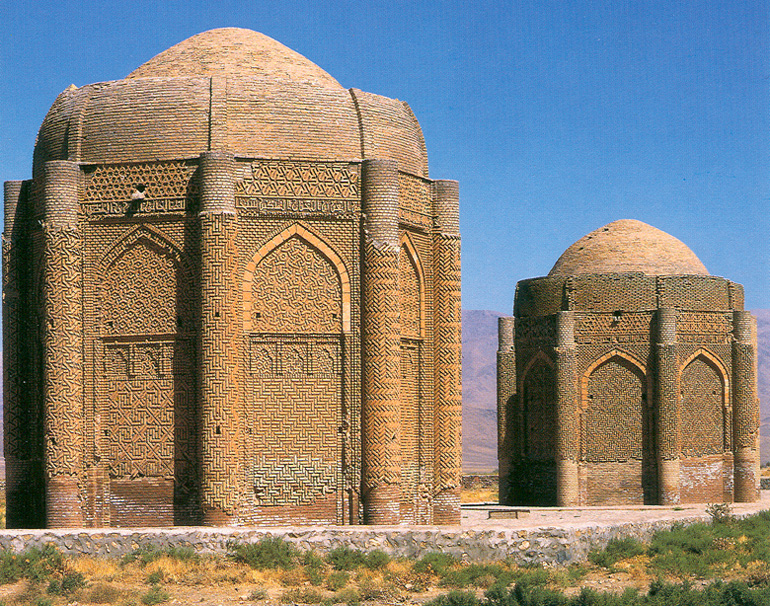
The Kharāghān twin towers, built in 1053 CE, Qazvin province

An Iranian architect is traditionally called a mi'mar (Persian: معمار, romanized: me'mâr; plural معماران me'mâran).

The Persian dictionary of Mo'in defines a mi'mar as:

1. That who devises the design and plan of a building, and overlooks its construction.
2. A Banna
3. That who is responsible for the building, developing, and repairs of a structure or edifice (Emārat).

Classical words Banna, Mohandes, Ostad, and Amal which appear in classical manuals and references of Islamic architecture.

Although many scholars do not recognize the Mimar and the Architect to historically be the same, they do agree that their responsibilities overlap extensively. In this list, they are taken to be the same.

The list is in chronological order and selectively spans the Islamic age based on available records. There is little, if any, record of the numerous masters of architecture that built some of the early Islamic and pre-Islamic world's wonders of Iran. It is unknown who built the palaces of Bishapur, Firuzabad, Persepolis, Susa, or the many other spectacular ancient edifices of Greater Iran. No record of their names exists. Only the ruins of what they built give us a faint indication of what masters must have walked the face of this earth eons ago.

Many of the structures remaining today possibly had more than one architect working on them. Only one is mentioned in the following list, and only their most famous work is mentioned. The list also contains the names of builders whom exact dates have been attributed to their buildings.

== Pre-Islamic ==
- Epsay: Holy shrine of Bishapur, 271 CE.
- Sheyda: Was a legendary master who built the magnificent Sasanian palace of Haft Gonbad of Bahram V, according to the poet Nizami Ganjavi.

== First four centuries of the Islamic era ==
- Mashallah ibn Athari: Designed and planned Baghdad.
- Naubakht: Designed and planned Baghdad.

== 13th century ==
- Moslem: Built the caravanserai of Sangbast in Khorasan in 1202CE.
- Muhammad Rigi: Built Mil-e Radkan in Quchan in 1203CE.
- Ahmad Ibn Bakr Marandi: Built the tomb of Keikavus in 1219CE.
- Saeed Ibn Jafar al-Bana: Built a tower in Firuzabad, Fars.
- Muahammad Ibn Ahmad Ibn Alavi: Built the Congregation mosque of Bunaft in Yazd in 1234CE.
- Ostad Zeinuddin Abu Rasheed: Built Hisar Khalaj in Baku in 1234CE.
- Ostad Enayatollah Ibn Nizamulddin Mimar Isfahani: Built the Gonbad-e Sabz in Kerman in 1242CE.
- Muhammad ibn Muhammad ibn Uthman al-Bana al-Tusi: Built the Madrasah of Sir Chali in Konya in 1242CE.
- Nizamuddin ibn Ostad Ali ibn Ali ibn Najjar: Built the Imamzadeh Seyd Jafar in Damghan in 1264CE.
- Badreddin Tabrizi: Built the tomb of Rumi in Konya in 1273CE.
- Zinul-abedin Mimar: Built the Congregation mosque of Urmia in 1276CE.
- Ostad Ali ibn Hosein Ali al-Ghazi: Built the Tomb of Sheikh Yusef Sarvestani in Fars in 1280CE.
- Muhammad al-Hosein al-Mohandes al-bana Damghani: Built the tower of Burj-e Kashaneh in Bastam in 1299CE.

== 14th century ==
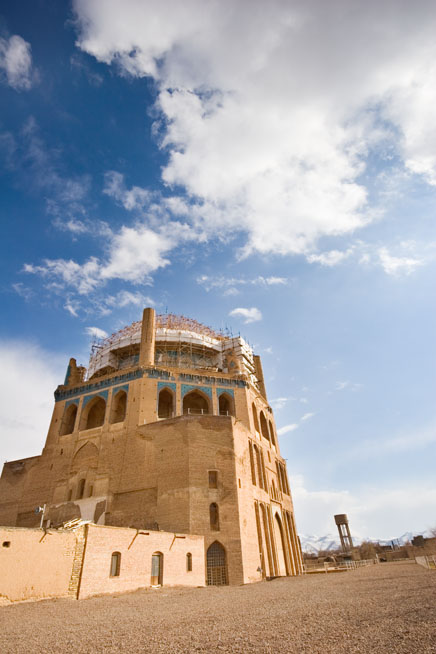
The eight-minareted Soltaniyeh

- Ostad Ali Haji al-Sanai al-Semnani: Built the Forumad mosque of Jajaram in Khorasan in 1319CE.
- Muhammad Shah Naqqash: Built the tomb of Pir-e Bakran in Isfahan in 1302CE.
- Sayyed Ali Shah: Built the Dome of Soltaniyeh in Zanjan in 1303CE also a UNESCO World Heritage Site.
- Masoud Kermani: Built the Mihrab of Imamzadeh Rabi'eh Khatun in Ashtarjan, Isfahan, in 1306CE.
- Heydar Yabadr: Built the mihrab of the Congregation mosque of Isfahan in 1310CE.
- Ahmad ibn Muhammad ibn al-Bana: Built the Congregation mosque of Ashtarjan, Isfahan, in 1314CE.
- Muhammad ibn Hasan ibn Ibitalib Mohandes Bana al-Damghani and his brother Haji: Built the tomb of Bayazid Bastami in 1323 CE.
- Ostad Muhammad ibn Jamal Ahmad: Built the Burj-i Dozal tower near Tabriz.
- Abu Taleb Damghani: Built Imamzadeh Jafar in Isfahan in 1324CE.
- Muhammad ibn Umar al-Sheikh: Built the northern Iwan of Madraseh-i Imami in Isfahan in 1324CE.
- Ali Qazvini: Built the Congregation mosque of Varamin in 1321CE.
- Ali ibn Ibrahim: Built the mosque of Tajang, Yazd, 1328CE.
- Ostad Aghajan ibn Damavandi: Built the Imamzadeh Abdollah in Damavand in 1329CE.
- Haji Muhammad al-Bana Savoji: Built the caravanserai of Seen in Isfahan in 1330CE.
- Khajeh Hosein ibn Seifuddin Mahmud ibn Taj Khajeh: Built the Congregation mosque of Marand in 1339CE.
- Falaki Tabrizi: Built Arg-e Alishah in 1337CE.
- Mafakhir an-Najjar Ustad Hasan ibn Jamal Ahmad Shir Gir: Built Imamzadeh Ghasem Azna in 1337CE.
- Sayyed Ali Amir Hosein al-Bukhari: Built Bogh'eh Mir Muhamad in Kharg island in 1339CE.
- Shokrollah: Built Congregation Mosque of Kerman, in 1348CE.
- Ustad Shamsiddin: Built the tomb of Shu-juk Beiga, sister of Tamerlane in Samarkand in 1370CE.
- Khajeh Hosein-e Shirazi: Built the Mausoleum of Khoja Ahmed Yasawi in Kazakhstan in 1396CE.
- Ustad Shirazi Mimar: Built the caravanserai of Dehbeed in Fars in 1384CE.
- Ustad Arif ibn Ustad Musa Jibal: Built the haji Sheikhleh Emarate in Shiravan in 1384CE.
- Ustad Ghashtasb ibn Musa: Built the public bath of Haji Zainuddin Damghani in sharvanshahan in 1387CE.

== 15th century ==
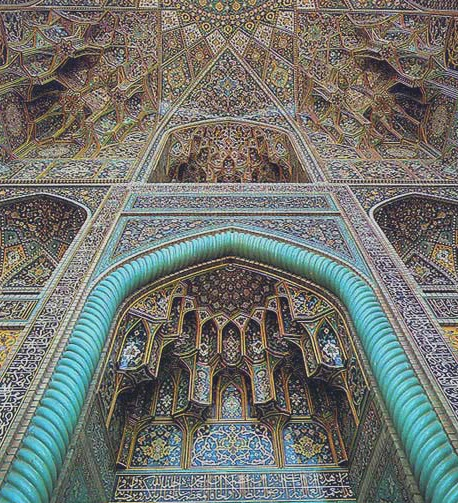
Goharshad Mosque, built in 1418 CE by the orders of Goharshad, wife of Shah Rukh

- Muhammad ibn Mahmud al-Isfahani: Built the Gur-i Amir, tomb of Tamerlane, in Samarkand in 1403CE.
- Sayyed Ali ibn Sayyed Kamaluddin Banna Amuli: Built the Burj-i Sultan Zainul-abideen in Sari in 1406CE.
- Ghavameddin Shirazi: Started to build the Goharshad Mosque in 1418 CE.
- Hasan Jafar Ustad Mimar Bashi: Built the Imamzadeh Abdollah tomb in Bafq.
- Muhammad ibn Ghadir aka Ajor-tarash: Built the Darb-i Imam mosque in Isfahan in 1427CE.
- Pasha ibn Bakshah Jamshid: Built the Emarat Shah Balu in the village of Ahu Dasht Natel Rastaq in 1435CE.
- Ustad Haji Ahmad: Built The Ghal'eh Ghar Khalar in Darband in 1437CE.
- Khajeh Mahmud Haj Zein Jame' Shirazi: Built the Mazar-e Sheikh Ahmad Jam complex in Khorasan in 1439CE.
- Abdolqadir Isfahani: Built the mosque of Dabbagh-khaneh in Ankara in 1443CE.
- Ustad Hasan ibn Ali Husein Bana Amuli: Built three extant structures in the village of Kajur in around 1443CE.
- Ustad Ghitheddin Shirazi: Built the Congregation mosque of Khargerd in Khorasan in 1443CE.
- Haydar Nafji: Built the khanqah of Nasr-abad in Isfahan in 1445CE.
- Shamsoddin Muhammad Tabrizi: Built the Mosque of Shah (Masjed-i Shah) in Mashad in 1451CE.
- Ustad Shamsoddin Ibn Nasrollah Motahhari: Built the Imamzadeh Soltan Mohammad Taher in Babol in 1470CE.
- Mohammad ibn Mahmud Bastami: Built the mosque of Masjed-i Sorkhan in Bastam in 1477CE.
- Hosein ibn Ali ibn Ahmad Lahijani: Built the mausoleum of Samām in Gilan in 1478CE.
- Darvish Nureddin: Built the mausoleum of Imamzadeh Ali in Shekarnab near Qazvin in 1479CE.
- Muhammad Ravan-i Qazvini: He and Haj Abbas ibn Mahmud Qazvini both built the pol-i dokhtar bridge in Miyaneh in Qazvin province in 1483CE.
- Yaqub Ruyani: Built both the Sim River bridge in Lahijan as well as the Polur River bridge northeast of Damavand in 1486 CE.

== 16th century ==
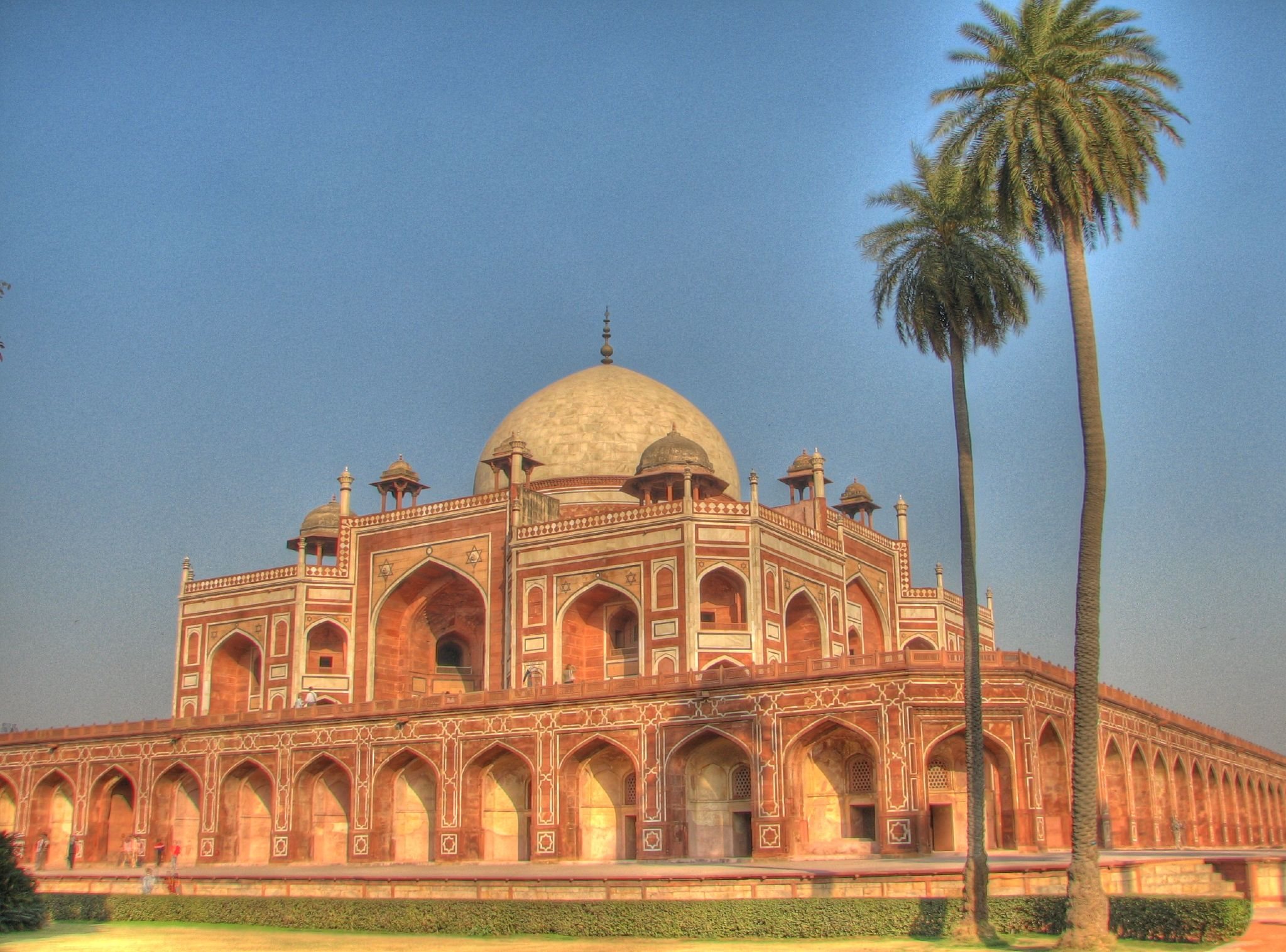
Humayun's Tomb, in Delhi

- Bayazid ibn Haji Javad: Built the Imamzadeh Yahya shrine in Larijan in 1513CE.
- Ostad Hosein Khorasani: Re-built the tomb of Sheikh Abdol-Samad in Natanz in 1514CE.
- Ustad Mir Ahmad ibn Mir Haji Qomi: Built the Masjed-e Jame'i Saveh mosque in Saveh in 1516CE.
- Farabi ibn Uthman Sa'di: Built the Masjed-i Bozorg-i Ghal'eh-i Hasan Keifa mosque in 1520CE.
- Ustad Hosein: Built the Mausoleum of Harun Velayat near Isfahan in 1521CE.
- Ustad Shamseddin Isfahani: Built the Mausoleum of Imamzadeh Hamzeh in Bavanat in 1528CE.
- Taqi Sultan Qomi: Built the famous Feyziyeh Qom seminary in Qom in 1532CE.
- Sani'ullah Mimar-i Yazdi: Built the Congregation mosque of Yazd in 1539CE.
- Ustad Shah Hosein Lahiji: Built the mausoleum of Agha Sheikh Abolvajih near Lahijan in 1540CE.
- Heydar Ali Ardestani: Built the popular shrine of Imamzadeh Mahruq in Nishapur in 1545CE.
- Sayyed Muhammad ibn Mirak Ghiyathuddin: Built the World Heritage Site of Humayun's Tomb in India in 1562CE.

== 17th century ==
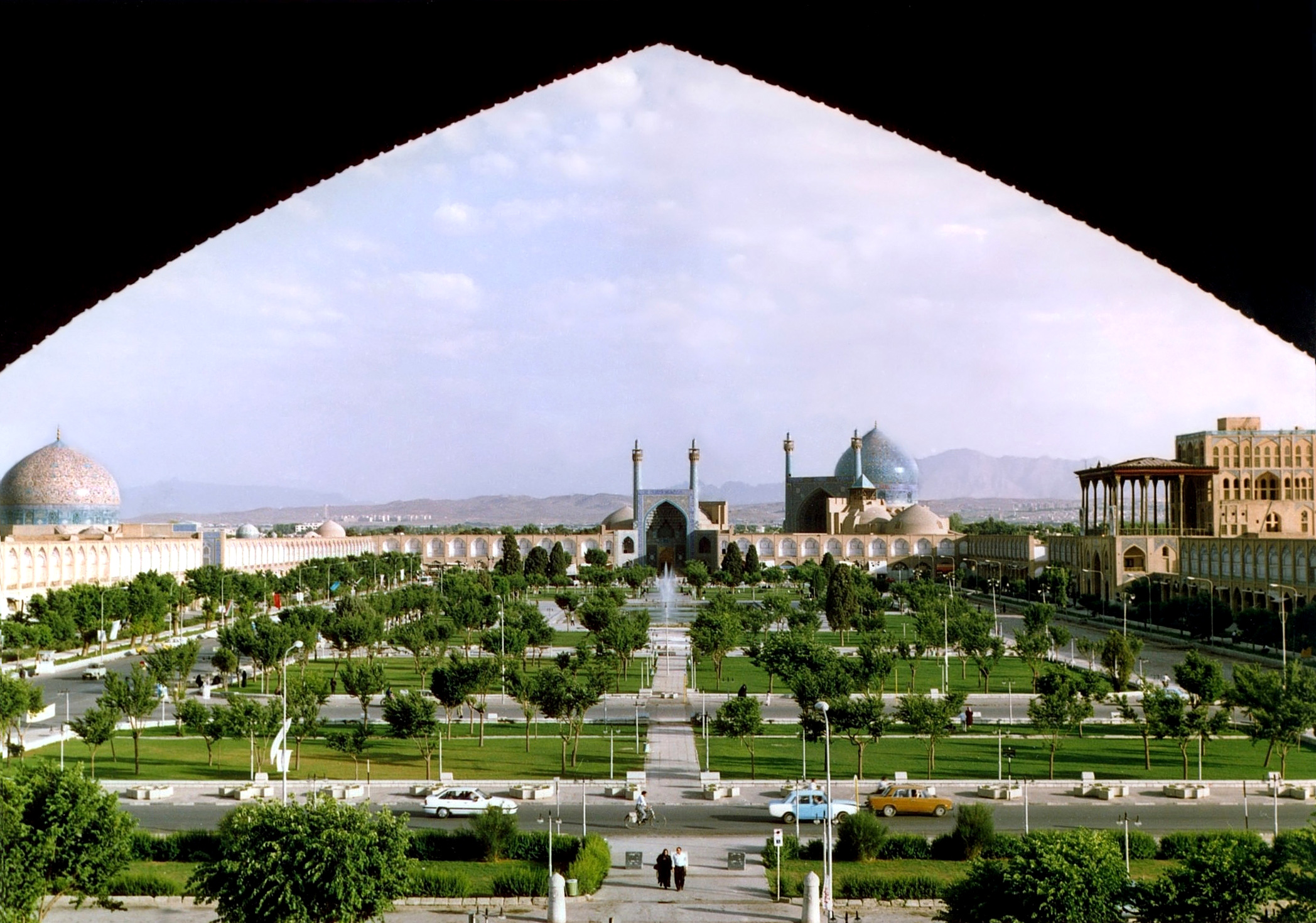
Naqsh-e Jahan Square, Isfahan

- Ahmad Sepah Banna: Built the Qeysarieh bazaar of Lar in 1605CE.
- Sultan Muhammad Yazdi: Built the caravanserai and bathhouse of Ganjali khan in Kerman in 1610CE.
- Ustad Ali Akbar Isfahani: He and two other associates built the Shah Mosque of Isfahan between 1612 and 1631.
- Ustad Hosein Shamā'i.e. Shirazi: Built the Madreseh Khan in Shiraz in 1615CE.
- Baha al-Din al-Amili: Designed a dam (band) in Qahrud, 35 km south of Kashan in 1616CE, as well as Naqsh-e Jahan Square and Charbagh Avenue in Isfahan, and the Monar Jonban, also known as the two shaking minarets.
- Abdol-jabbar: Built the Madreseh Shirdar in Shiraz in 1618CE.
- Muhammad Reza ibn Ustad Hosein Banna Isfahani: Built the Sheikh Lotfollah Mosque in Isfahan in 1618CE.
- Mulla Alaul Maulk Tuni: One of the architects of Shalimar Gardens, Lahore.
- Shah Taher ibn Sultan Muhammad Naqqash: Built the mausoleum of Sheikh Jabrail in 1621CE near Ardabil.
- Ostad Ebrahim Banna Esfahani: Worked at the tomb of Abdussamad Esfahani in Natanz and at the Jameh Mosque of Isfahan.
- Ustad Muhammad Banna: Built the Robat of Shah Abbas Polur near Lar in 1624CE.
- Ustad Hoseinali: Built the Imamzadeh Ismail in Isfahan in 1632CE.
- Muhammad Ali ibn ustad Alibeyk-i banna Isfahani: Built the Masjed-i Hakim mosque in Isfahan in 1661CE.
- Ustad Qasem Mimar: Built the caravanserai of Damghan in 1680CE.
- Muhammad Taher Hamadani: Built the Masjed-i soltani in Asad-abad in Hamadan in 1685CE.
- Ustad Taher valad ustad Reza Isfahani: Built the caravanserai of Sheikh Ali-khan a.k.a. Chaleh siyah-i no in 1686CE in Isfahan.
- Heydar ibn Hosein banna Isfahani: Built the masjed-i varzaneh mosque of Isfahan in 1687CE.
- Mehdi Hoseini: Built a dam (band) near the village of Shamanlu over the Zayandeh River in 1689CE.
- Ustad Isa Shirazi: He and many others were responsible for building the Taj Mahal in Agra in India.

== 18th century ==
- Muhammad Hadi Qazvini: Built the masjed-i muhaddathayn-i sheikh-i kabir mosque in Babol in 1723CE.
- Ostad baqer Isfahani: Built the Minarat of Kashan's Congregation mosque, 1779CE.
- Ustad Mirza Shirazi: Built the Al-Nabi Mosque, Qazvin in 1787CE.
- Ustad Iskandar Shirazi: Built the Masjed Soltani mosque of Borujerd in 1794CE.
- Karbalaee Muhammad-i banna: Built the Masjed-i Qajar mosque in astar-abad in Hamadan in 1796CE.
- Ustad Haj Sha'ban-ali: Built the Masjed-i Agha bozorg in Kashan in the late 18th century.

== 19th century ==
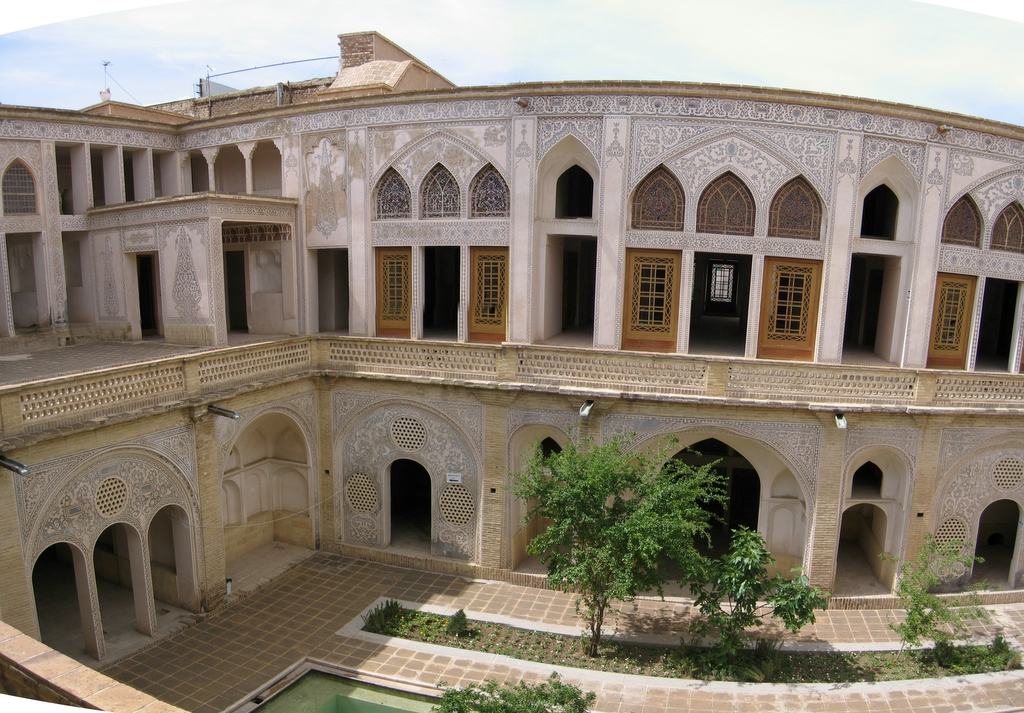
Abbasian House in Kashan

- Muhammad Taqi khan Mimar-Bashi: Built the Dar ol-fonoon in 1849CE.
- Abdallah Khan: court architect to Mohammad Shah Qajar.
- Haji Abol-hasan Mimar Navai: Built Golestan Palace to its current form in 1865CE.

== 20th century ==
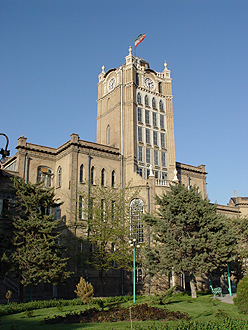
Tabriz City Hall, by Arfa'ul Mulk

- Dariush Borbor: Bazaar Reza, Mashhad, Museum and Library, Mashhad. Described as "one of the most innovative architects who is perhaps on the way of creating a Persian architectural style of the 20th century". Recipient of the Gold Mercury International Award from Italy, and 50 Outstanding Architects of the World from the Second Belgrade Triennial of World Architecture.
- Hossein Amanat: Built the Azadi Tower in 1971

== Contemporary ==
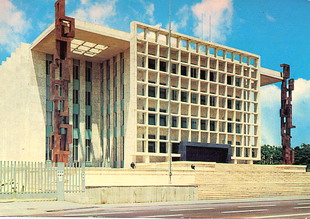
Iranian Senate building by Heydar Ghiaï-Chamlou

- Dariush Borbor
- Kamran Afshar Naderi
- Keyvan Khosrovani
- Hossein Amanat
- Kamran Diba: Tehran Museum of Contemporary Arts/Niavaran garden and cultural complex
- Abdol-Aziz Mirza Farmanfarmaian: University of Tehran mosques and technical college/Azadi sport complex/Niavaran Palace
- Abbas Gharib
- Heydar Ghiai: Iran's Senate House
- Nasser Golzari
- Nader Khalili
- Pouya Khazaeli
- Mouzhan Majidi
- Tahmineh Milani
- Hadi Mirmiran: winner of many 1990s major competitions and the only architect to win a medal of honour in art after the revolution
- Mohammad Karim Pirnia
- Mohsen Mostafavi
- Farshid Moussavi
- Fariborz Sahba
- Ali Akbar Saremi
- Hooshang Seyhoun: Ibn sina monument/Nader shah Monument/Baba Taher Monument
- Bahram Shirdel
- Moein Jalali
- Iraj Kalantari Taleghani
- Nader Tehrani
- Siavash Teimouri
- Yaaghoob Rashtchian: prominent architect active in urban rehabilitation and architectural restoration of historic areas and buildings in many iranian cities
- Alireza Taghaboni
- Mohamadreza Ghodousi

=== Outside Iran ===
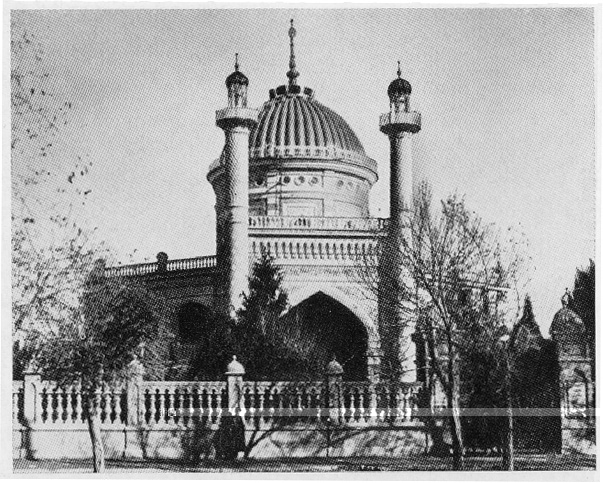
First Bahaʼi House of Worship (1908), Turkmenistan, designed by Ustad' Ali-Akbar Banna Yazdi

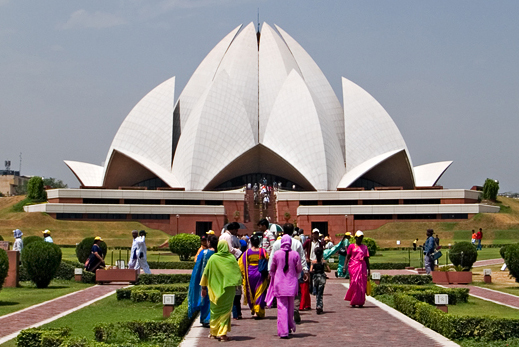
Fariborz Sahba's Lotus Temple in India
- Ustad' Ali-Akbar Banna Yazdi: designed the first Bahaʼi House of Worship in the world in Ashgabat
- Mohsen Mostafavi
- Hariri and Hariri: Gisue Hariri and Mojgan Hariri are two of the most famous Iranian American architects. They are listed in "40 Top architects under 40".
- Farshid Moussavi
- Fariborz Sahba: a Baháʼí architect who designed the famous Lotus temple in India
- Hossein Amanat: works include Azadi Tower and Sharif University
- Shahram Entekhabi
- Nader Khalili: founder of CalEarth Institute; featured by the Los Angeles Times and New York Times

== See also ==
- Iranian architecture
- Modern architecture
- Islamic architecture
