= Interpretatio Alcorani =

Translation and commentary of the Quran

- Author: Dominicus Germanus de Silesia
- Language: Latin, Arabic
- Subject: Quran
- Genre: Theology
- Publication place: Spain

Interpretatio Alcorani litteralis (fully: Interpretatio Alcorani litteralis cum scholiis ad mentem authoris, ex propriis domesticis ipsius expositoribus, Germane collectis ) is a Latin translation and commentary of the Quran completed by Dominicus Germanus de Silesia in 1669. The original manuscript (MS Escorial 1624) contains 528 folios and is kept at El Escorial.

== Description ==
Dominicus Germanus de Silesia's autograph (MS Escorial 1624) contains 528 folios. In addition to a Latin translation of the Quran, for each surah Dominicus Germanus de Silesia includes curated tafsir, or exegesis by Muslim commentators, including Abd al-Razzaq Kāshānī. These selections of tafsir are presented in Latin translation as well as in the original Arabic text.

Ulisse Cecini considers Interpretatio Alcorani to be the most important work of Dominicus Germanus de Silesia.

== History ==
Dominicus Germanus de Silesia's work was never published in print until a critical edition of the Latin translation was published in 2009. As such, the work had little impact at the time it was produced. There are no copies outside of El Escorial except for one manuscript copy in the library of the Faculty of Medicine of the University of Montpellier (H-72).
