= Abd al-Razzaq Kāshānī =

Kamāl al-Dīn Kāshānī Abd al-Razzaq Kāshānī عبدالرزاق کاشانی
- Born: Unknown, theorized to be between 1252 and 1262
- Died: 1345; Buried at the Jameh Mosque of Natanz in Natanz, Iran
- Influences: Ibn Arabi, Abdussamad Esfahani
- Influenced: Shah Nimatullah Wali and Haydar Amuli
- Major works: Ta'wilat al-Qur'an al-Karim

Kamāl al-Dīn Abūʾl-Faḍl Abd al-Razzaq ibn Jamāl al-Dīn Abu al-Ghānīm Kāshānī (Persian: کمال‌الدّین ابوالفضل عبدالرزّاق بن جمال‌الدین ابى‌الغنائم کاشانى), better known as Abd al-Razzaq Kāshānī (عبدالرزاق کاشانی) was a 14th-century Persian Sufi mystic and scholar. He wrote the Ta'wilat al-Qur'an al-Karim, a mystical exegesis (interpretation) of the Quran.

== History ==
Abd al-Razzaq was born in Kashan. His birthdate is unknown, theorised to be between 1252 and 1262. As an adult, he became a disciple of Abdussamad Esfahani. Abd al-Razzaq went on nine trips throughout his lifetime to places such as Shiraz and the Iraqi cities of Najaf and Baghdad; his trips always ended in a return to Natanz. In Semnan, he debated with the Kubrāwī Sufi mystic 'Ala' al-Dawla Simnani over the concept of Wahdat al-Wujood. He also wrote a commentary on Ibn Arabi's Fusus al-Hikam. Abd al-Razzaq died in 1345. He was buried next to his first teacher, Esfahani, in the khanqah of the Jameh Mosque of Natanz.

== Legacy ==
Abd al-Razzaq inspired generations of Sufis. He was respected by Shi'ites. His writings influenced the Sufi mystics Shah Nimatullah Wali and Haydar Amuli who frequently quoted from him. Abd al-Razzaq is a prominent figure in schools dedicated to teaching Ibn Arabi's mysticism.
