= Mimar =

Mimar (Arabic: معمار, romanized: miʕmār, lit. 'one who constructs') is an Arabic word for an architect. In English, it may refer to:

- A title used for Iranian architects
- An honorific title in the Ottoman Empire (cf. Mimar Sinan)
