= Ostad Ebrahim Banna Esfahani =

Iranian architect

Ostad Ebrahim Banna Esfahani (Persian: استاد ابراهیم بنای اصفهانی) was an Iranian architect who flourished in 17th-century Safavid Iran. Born to Ostad Esmail Banna Esfahani, he hailed from Isfahan and in all likelihood descended from a family of distinguished craftsmen, for he and his father are referred to as "master" (ostād). His name is attested on two tiles; at the tomb of Abdussamad Esfahani in Natanz and at the Jameh Mosque of Isfahan. On both tiles, Ostad Ebrahim is referred to as the "builder from Isfahan".

== Sources ==
- Babaie, Sussan (2018). "Chasing after Muhandis: Visual Articulations of the Architect and Architectural Historiography". In Rizvi, Kishwar (ed.). Affect, Emotion, and Subjectivity in Early Modern Muslim Empires: New Studies in Ottoman, Safavid, and Mughal Art and Culture. Brill. p. 25. ISBN 978-9004352841.
- Blair, Sheila S. (1997). "EBRĀHĪM B. ESMĀʿĪL". In Yarshater, Ehsan (ed.). Encyclopædia Iranica. Vol. VIII/1: Ebn ʿAyyāš–Economy V. London and New York: Routledge & Kegan Paul. p. 63. ISBN 978-1-56859-050-9.
