= Jameh Mosque of Natanz =

Shi'ite mosque and imamzadeh complex in Natanz, Isfahan, Iran

Jāmeh Mosque of Natanz
- (مسجد جامع نطنز)
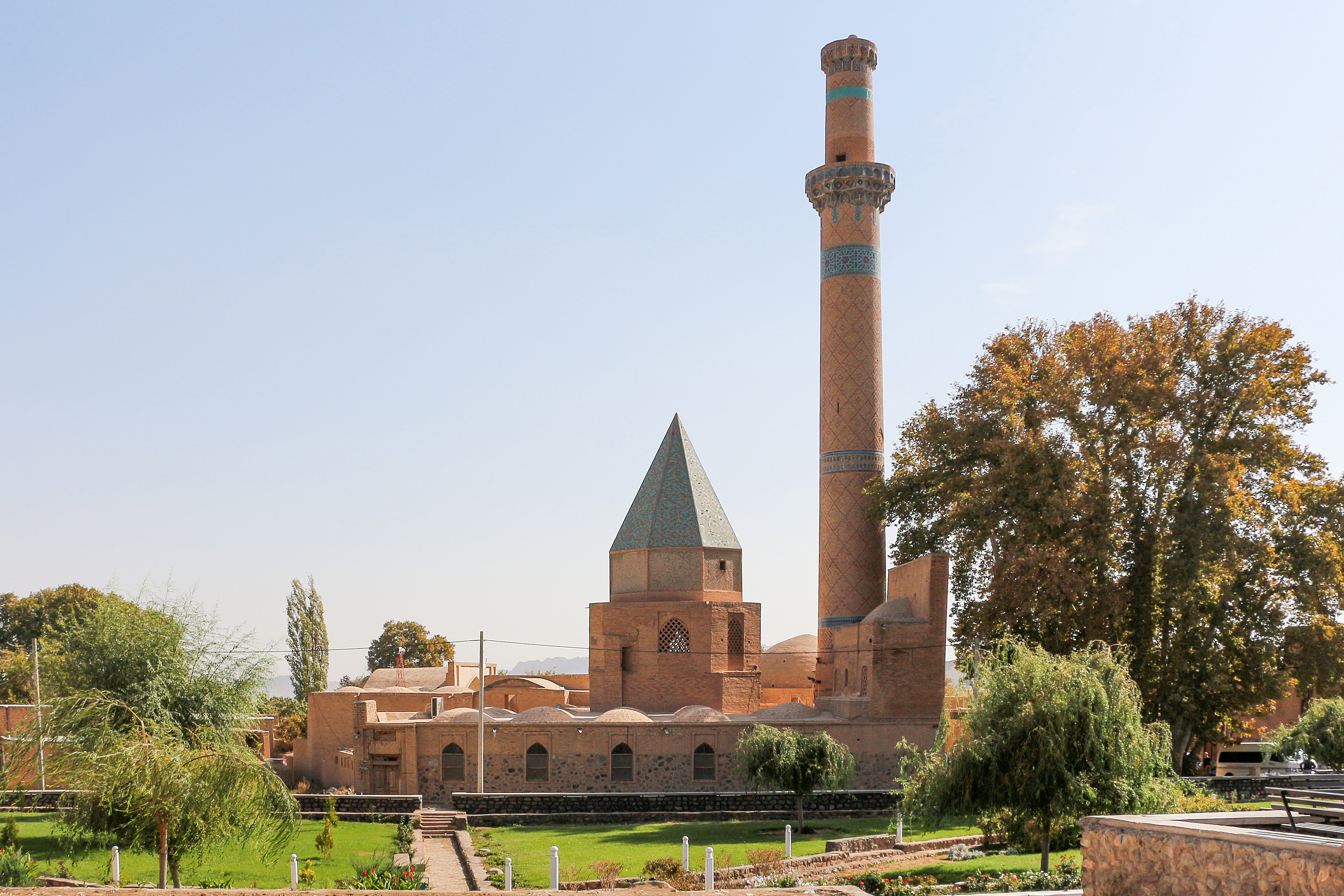
- The mosque and imamzadeh complex in 2016

- Location of the mosque in Iran

Religion
- Affiliation: Shia Islam
- Ecclesiastical or organisational status: Friday mosque; Khanqah; Mausoleum
- Status: Active

Location
- Location: Natanz, Isfahan province
- Country: Iran
- Coordinates: 33°31′05″N 51°54′47″E

Architecture
- Type: Mosque architecture
- Style: Buyid; Seljuk; Ilkhanid; Pahlavi (Shabestan)
- Completed: Dome: 999 CE; Mosque: 704 AH (1304/1305 CE) to 709 AH (1309/1310 CE); Tomb: 707 AH (1307/1308 CE); Khanqah: c.716 AH (1316/1317 CE); Minaret: 725 AH (1324/1325 CE); Mosque (south): 1422 CE; Mosque (north): 1565 CE; Shabestan: 1930s

Specifications
- Domes: Two (large); Several (small)
- Minaret: One
- Minaret height: 37 m (121 ft)
- Shrine: One: (Abdul Samad al-Isfahani)
- Materials: Bricks; plaster; tiles

Iran National Heritage List
- Official name: Friday Mosque of Natanz
- Type: Friday Mosque
- Designated: 1932
- Reference no.: 188
- Conservation organization: Cultural Heritage, Handicrafts and Tourism Organization of Iran

The Jāmeh Mosque of Natanz (Persian: مسجد جامع نطنز, romanized: Masjid-i Jami (Natanz), lit. 'Great Mosque of Natanz') is a Shi'ite Friday mosque (jāmeh), khanqah, and mausoleum complex located in the city of Natanz, in the province of Isfahan, Iran.

The imamzadeh complex dates from the Mongol Ilkhanid era and was first constructed during the reign of the Mongol ruler Öljaitü; and it contains the tomb of Abdul Samad al-Isfahani, a prominent Sufi ascetic. The complex was added to the Iran National Heritage List on 9 July 1932, administered by the Cultural Heritage, Handicrafts and Tourism Organization of Iran.

== History ==
After Abdul Samad al-Isfahani died in 1299 CE, his successor, Shams al-Din Natanzi, proposed the construction of a shrine and khanqah over his grave. The vizier of Ilkhanid ruler Öljaitü, Zayn al-Din Mastari, supported his proposition and ordered construction to be carried out.

Inscriptions throughout the complex date the following structures:

- the original dome from 4th century AH (c. 999 CE),
- the mosque from 704 AH (1304/1305 CE) to 709 AH (1309/1310 CE),
- the tomb of Shaykh Abdul Samad from 707 AH (1307/1308 CE),
- the khanqah from c.716 AH (1316/1317 CE), and
- the 37-metre-high (121 ft) minaret from 725 AH (1324/1325 CE).

A restoration in the 1970s revealed that the base of the tomb of the saint predated the mosque, and was originally a free-standing pavilion from the Buyid era, dating to the late tenth century.

The khanqah of the mosque was severely damaged during the 2009 Afghanistan–Iran clash.

== Architecture ==
=== General plan ===
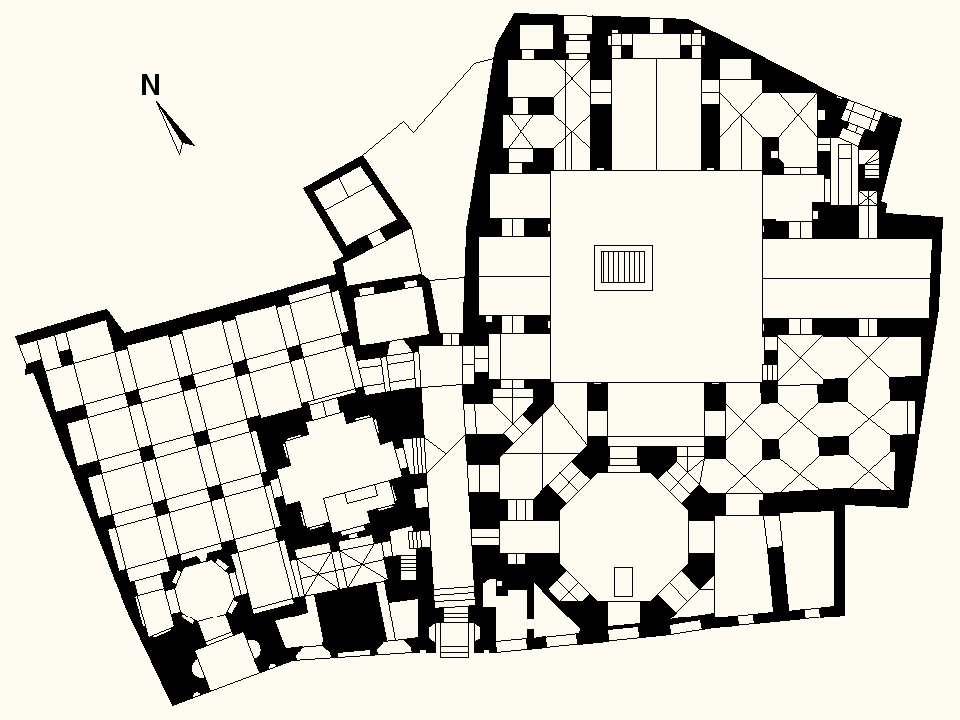
Floor plan of the complex

The complex contains a four-iwan mosque, an octagonal sanctuary, a minaret, and a mosque from the 1930s fronted by a fourteenth-century khanqah portal. The organization of these structures at varying angles and on multiple floor levels reflects the difficulty with which they were inserted into the existing built context. The much-admired southern façade of colorful glazed tile, terracotta, and stucco bends slightly to bring together the four constituent structures that lie behind, creating a harmonious exterior appearance.

=== Mosque ===
The mosque complex consists of two sections. The older section contains the main mosque, with a brick dome that dates from the Buyid era. The oldest inscription of the monument is on the eastern side of the dome, and it records the construction as dating from 999 CE. This inscription is part of the old Buyid pavilion which does not exist anymore.

The eastern part of the complex is occupied by the main mosque, which has four iwans. An arched portal leads through a short flight of stairs onto a corridor, which ends in the southwestern corner of the courtyard of the mosque. The façades of the courtyard are two stories high and connect four iwans, each with different depths. Two bays at the rear of the south iwan flank the qibla wall, and lead to the shrine of Abdul Samad al-Isfahani, which is topped by a conical dome on an octagonal base. The outer shell of the tomb is made from brick and turquoise tiles. The inner shell is decorated with muqarnas and stucco. The grave of the saint is within a wooden zarih, held together using mortise.

The southern façade of the mosque is made of glazed tiles in varied colours, as well as terracotta and stucco, to bring together the structures present within the mosque complex. An iwan is present on the southwestern façade of the mosque. It leads to an aisle, located 1.5 metres (4 ft 11 in) below the floor. On the right side of the aisle, a smaller one ends the shabestan of the mosque, shaped like an octagon. The mihrab of this shabestan was decorated with glazed tiles during the Qajar era. On the east side of this sanctuary is the main prayer hall of the mosque.

=== Tomb ===
'Abd al-Samad al-Isfahani, a shaykh of the Suharwardi Sufi order, died in Natanz in 1299. During the decade that followed, the site of his grave was developed by the vizier Zayn al-Din Mastari into what has survived to be one of the best preserved of Ilkhanid shrine complexes. The tomb tower takes the form of a domed cube. The dome itself is conical and rests on an octagonal drum. Its exterior is covered with glazed tilework while its interior is vaulted in muqarnas.

=== Khanqah ===
The portal on the western end of the façade is the only remnant of an early 14th-century khanqah that was destroyed and replaced by a mosque in the 1930s. The portal takes the form of a tall, two-story iwan with a pointed arched vault. The façade of the iwan is decorated with both glazed fired tiles and unglazed carved terracotta.

=== Minaret ===
The minaret of the complex rises to the east of the khanqah façade. It is cylindrical in form and rises from a square base to a height of 37 metres (121 ft). On the side of the minaret's base facing the facade (south) is a niche decorated with a panel inscribed with the date 725 AH (1324/1325 CE).

== Gallery ==
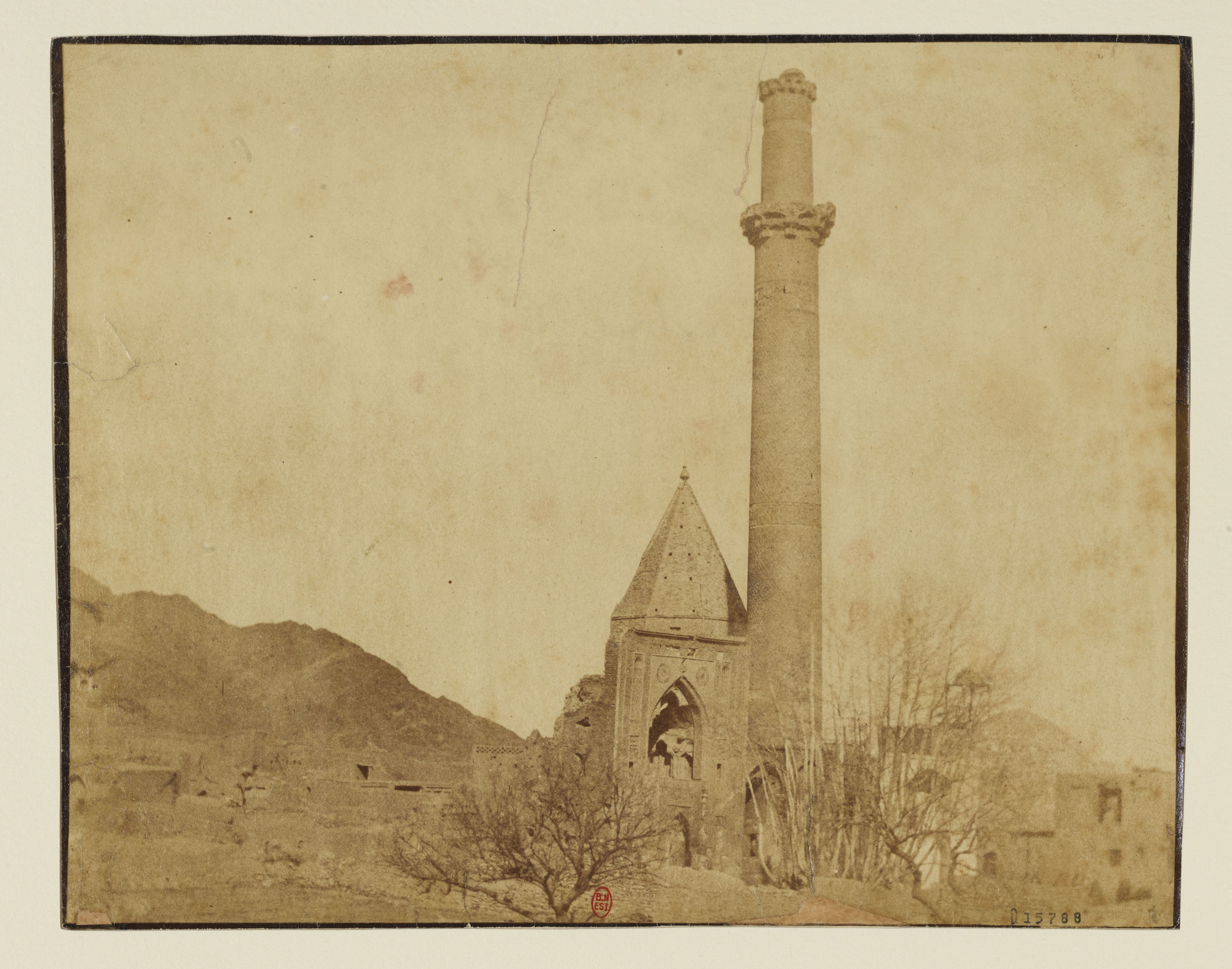
The religious complex in the 19th century

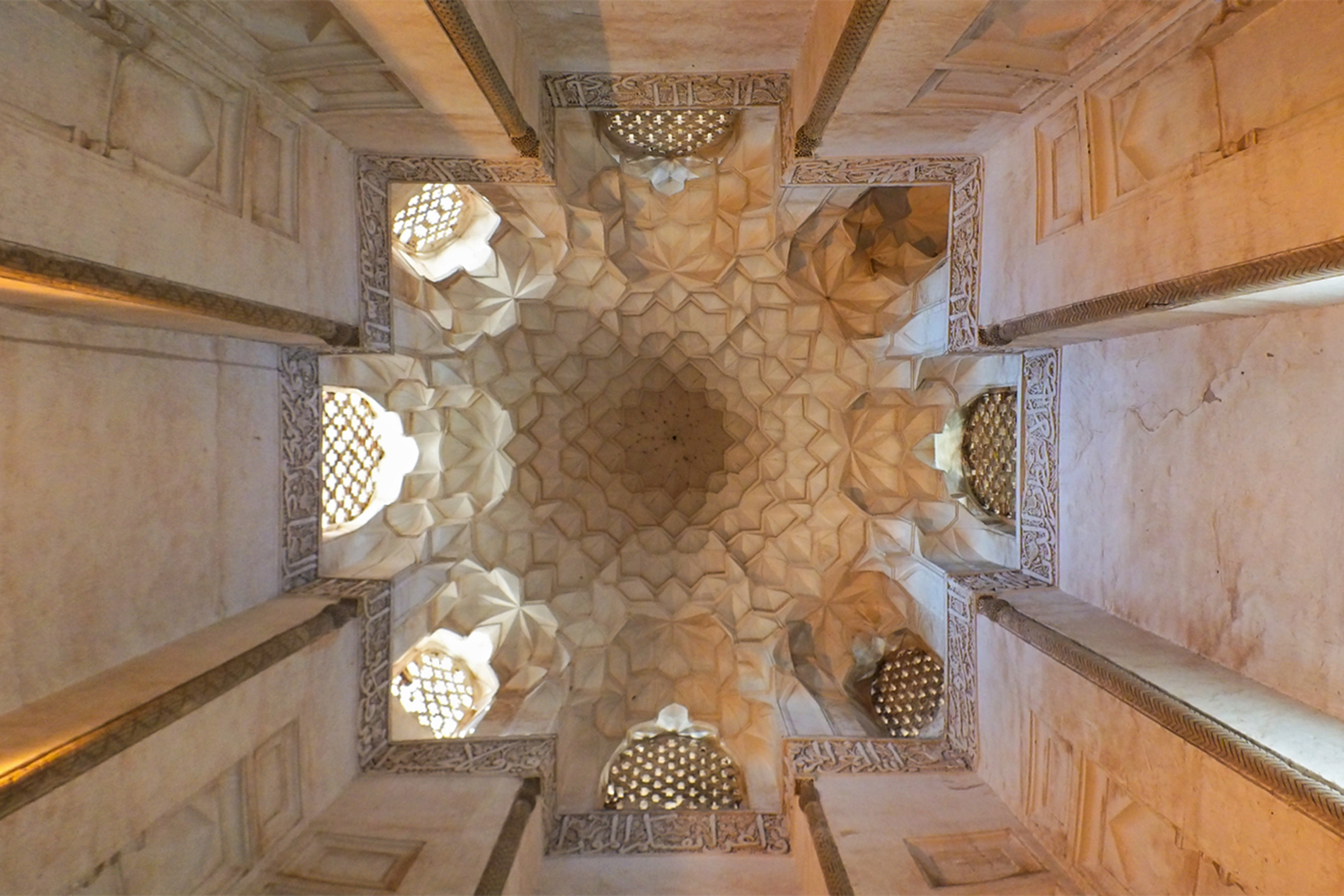
The muqarnas under the conical dome of the tomb chamber

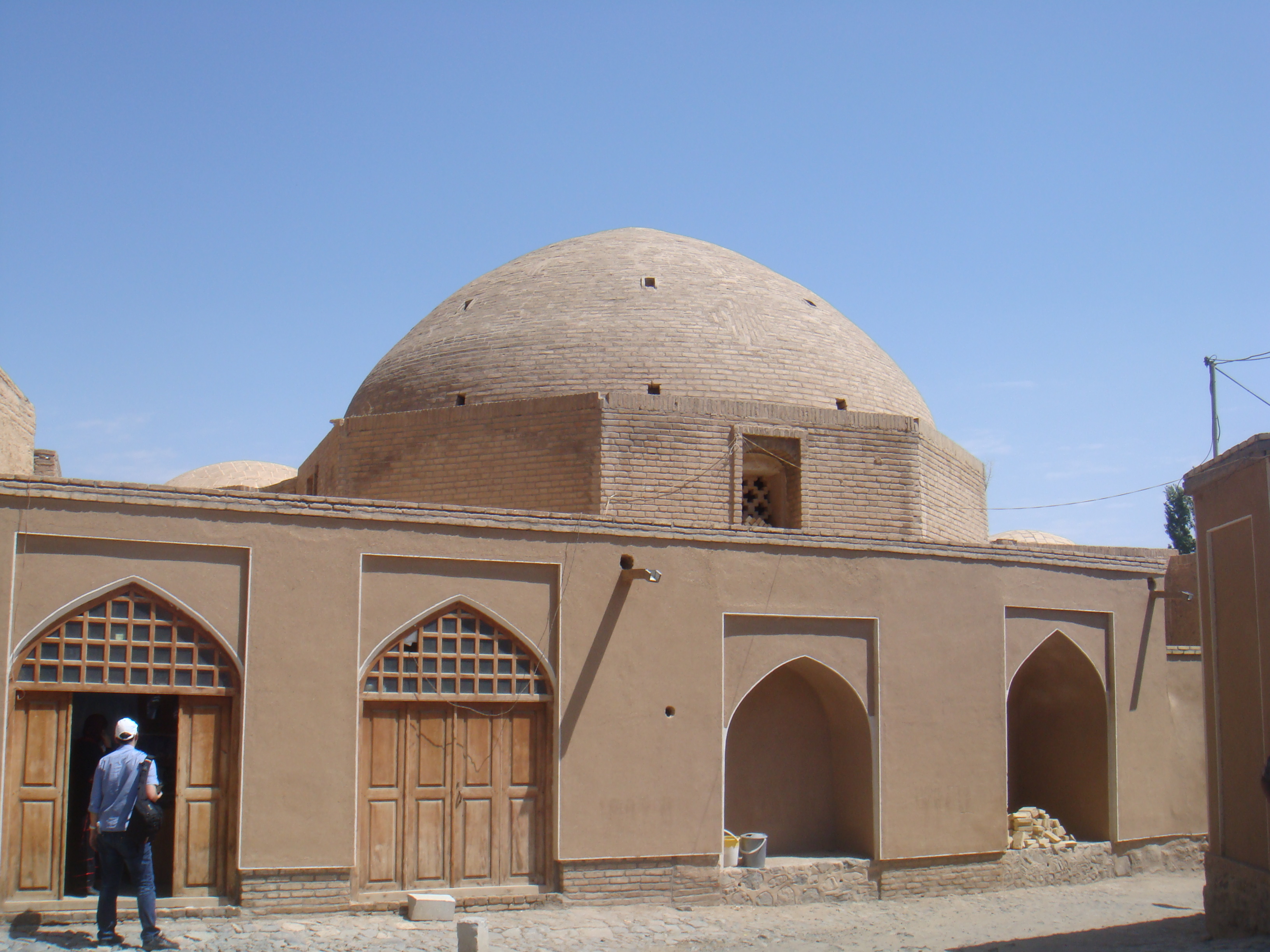
The dome over the main prayer hall of the mosque

== See also ==
- Islam in Iran
- List of mosques in Iran
- List of imamzadehs in Iran
- List of historical structures in Isfahan province
