= Abbāsi House =

Historic site in Kashan, Iran

Abbassian House
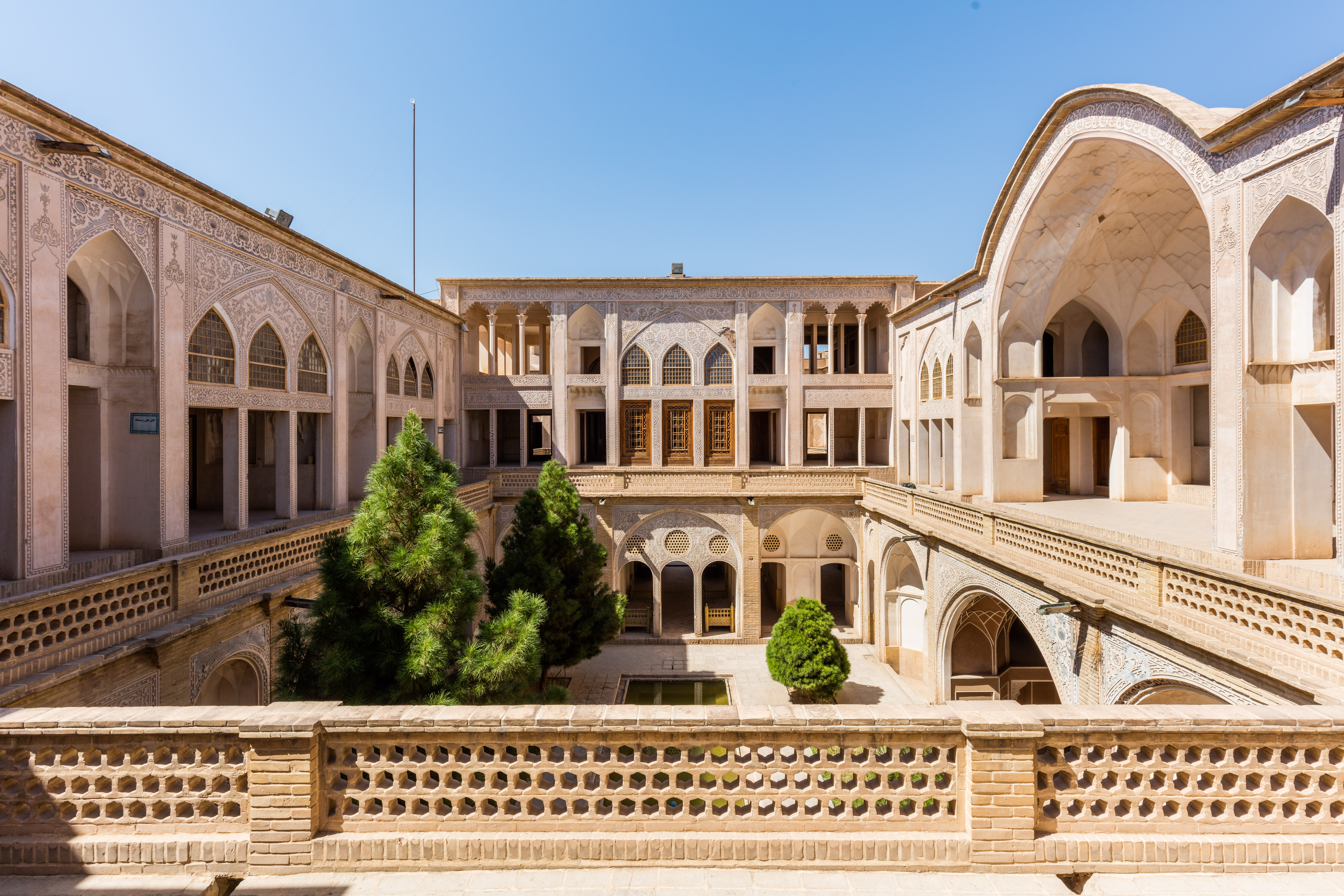

General information
- Architectural style: Iranian
- Location: Kashan, Iran
- Coordinates: 33.9762°N 51.4405°E

The Abbāsi House (Persian: خانه عباسیان) is a large historic house museum in Kashan, Iran. It was built during the late 18th century and belonged to a wealthy glass merchant. It is partly converted into a teahouse, a traditional restaurant, and a small shop. Other such houses, including the Borujerdi House and the Tabātabāei House, are located nearby.

== Structure ==
The Abbassian House consists of several courtyards and multistorey buildings, and is decorated with plaster reliefs, mirror-work, and stained glass.

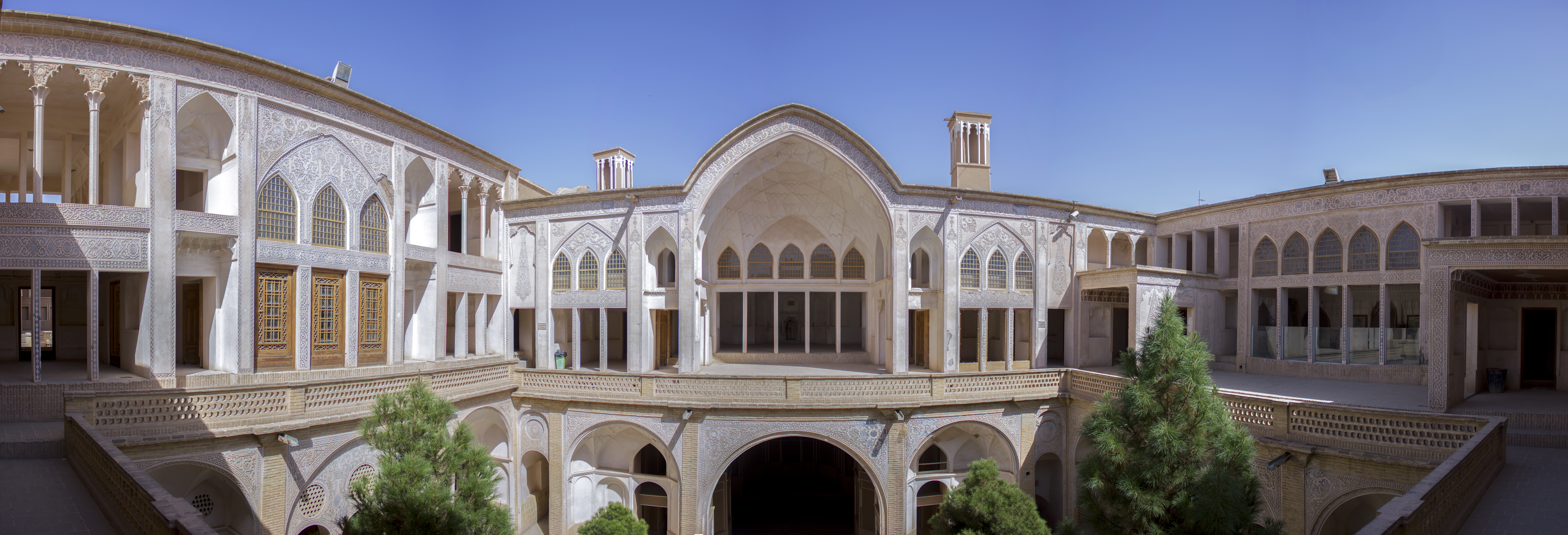
A panoramic view of the Abbāsi House.

== Gallery ==
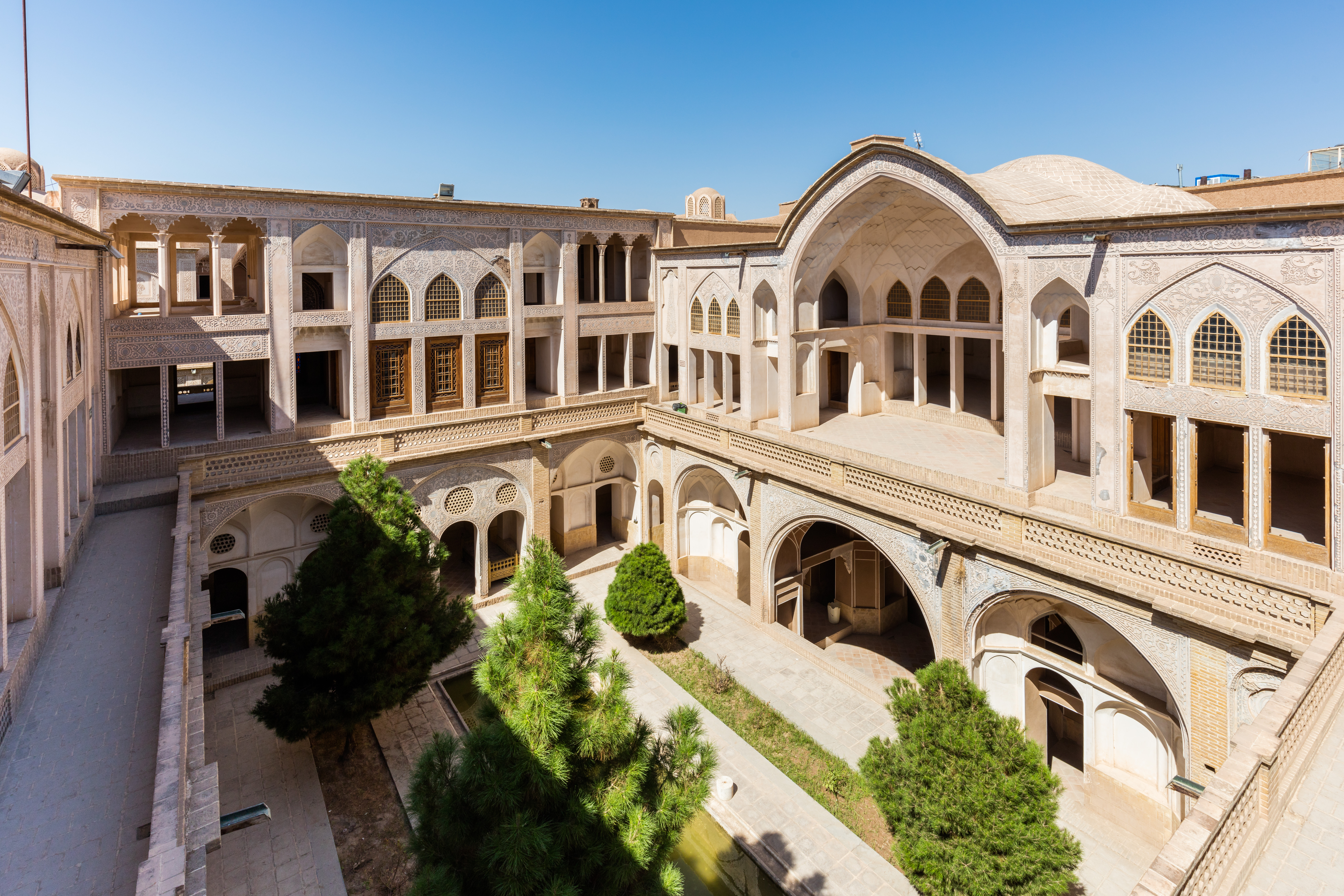
An exterior view of the Abbāsi House and its central courtyard.

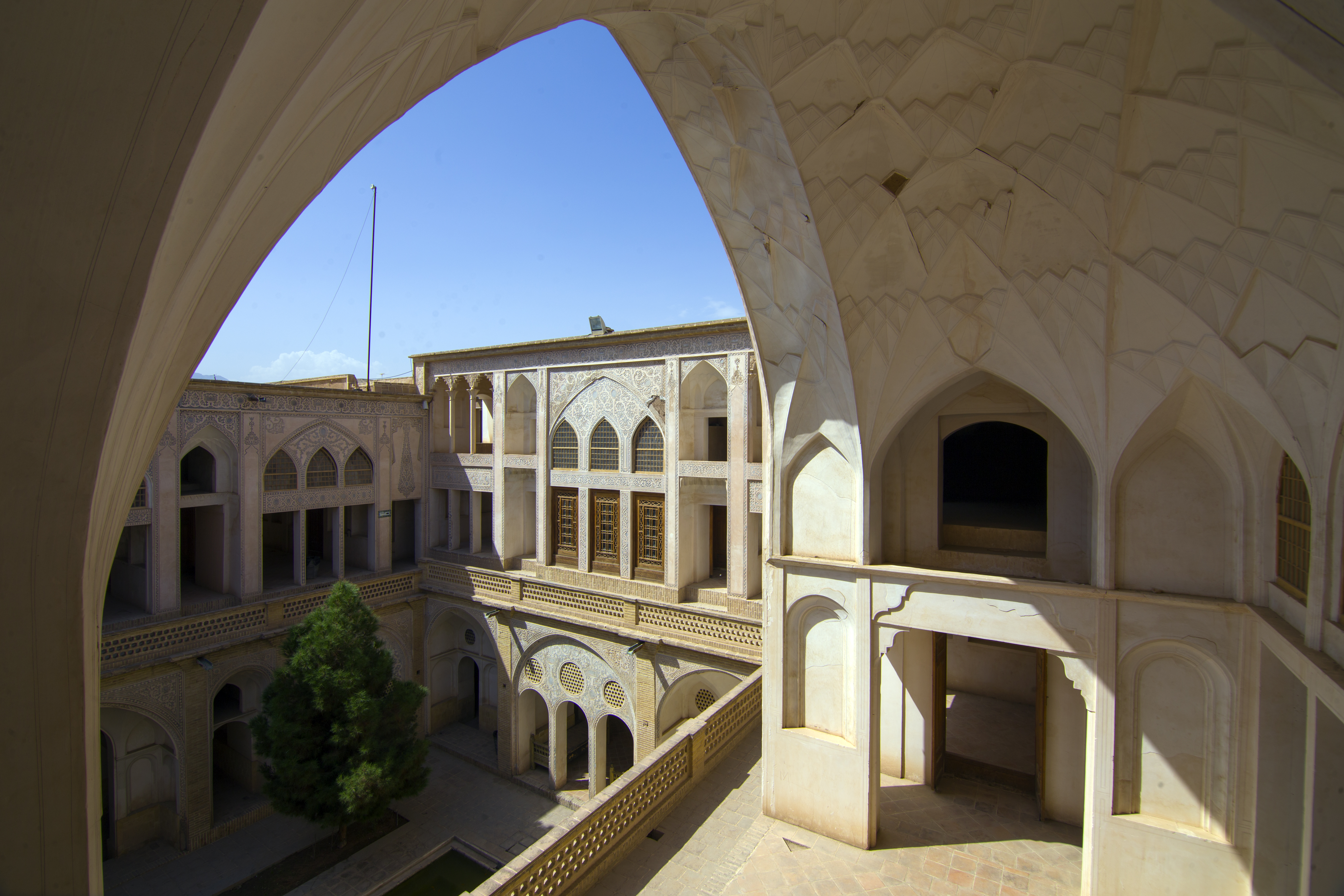
A view from within an iwan (balcony) inside the Abbāsi House.

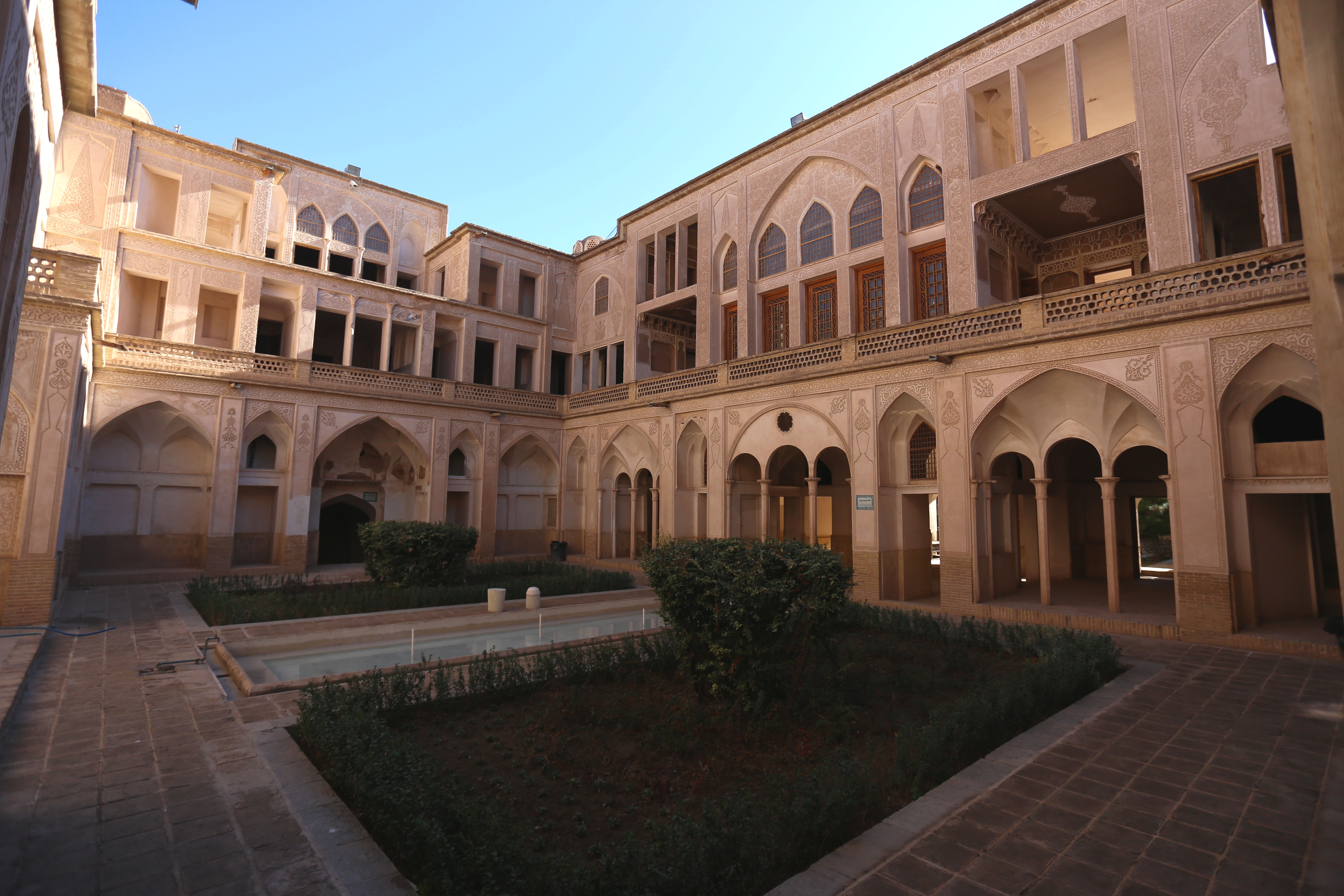
Gardens and a pool in the central yard of the Abbāsi House.

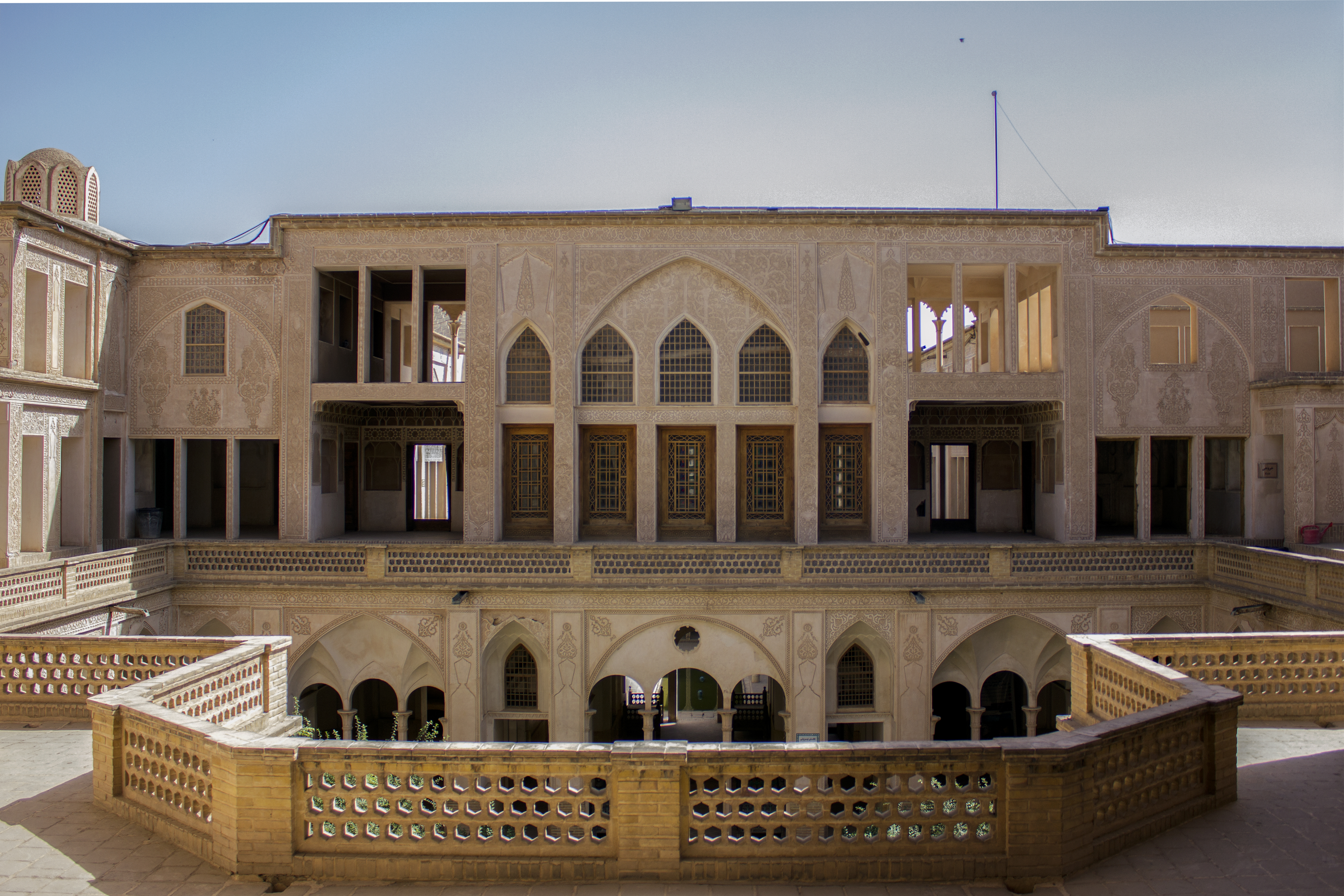
An exterior view of the upper floor of the Abbāsi House.

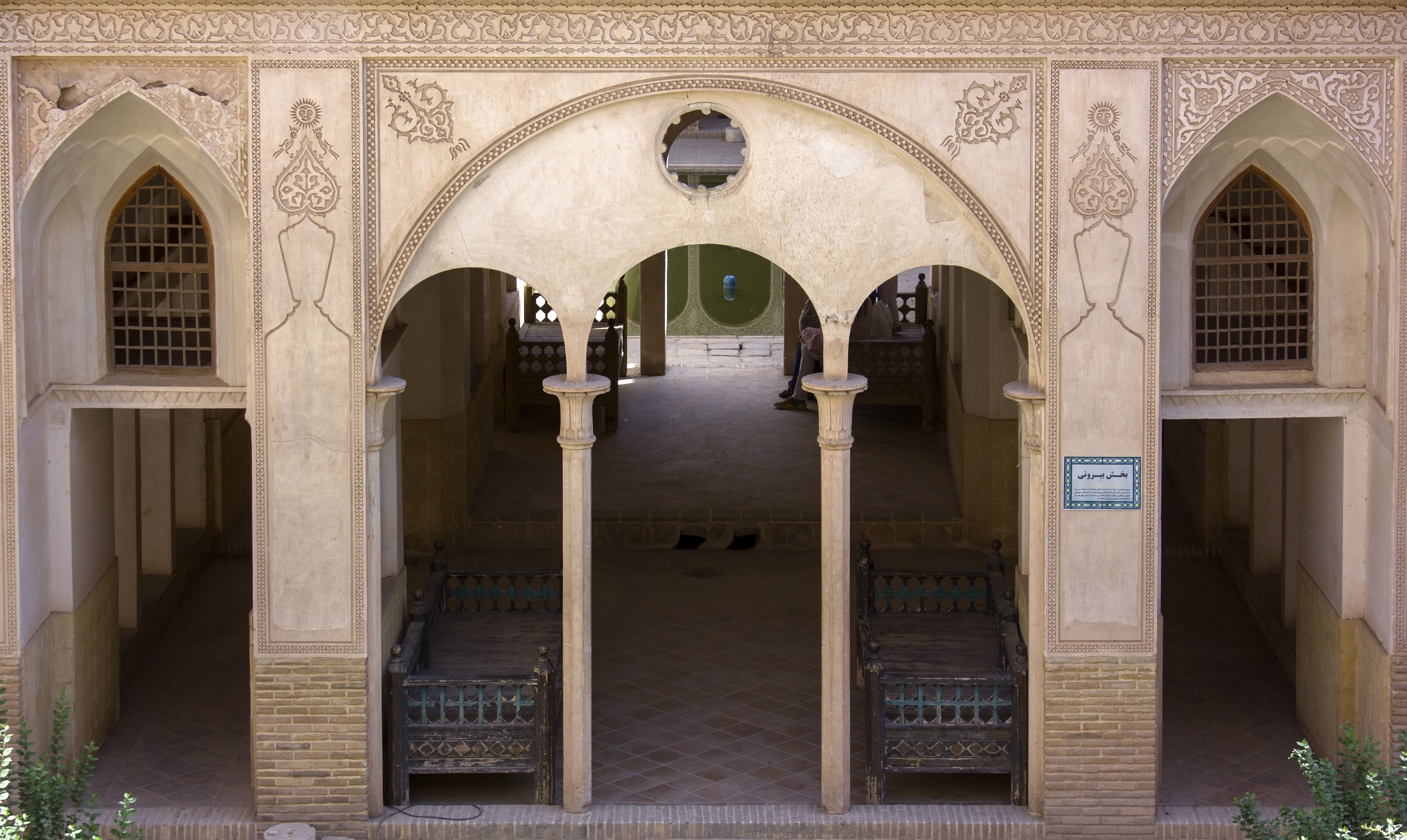
An exterior view of lower-floor hallways inside the Abbāsi House.

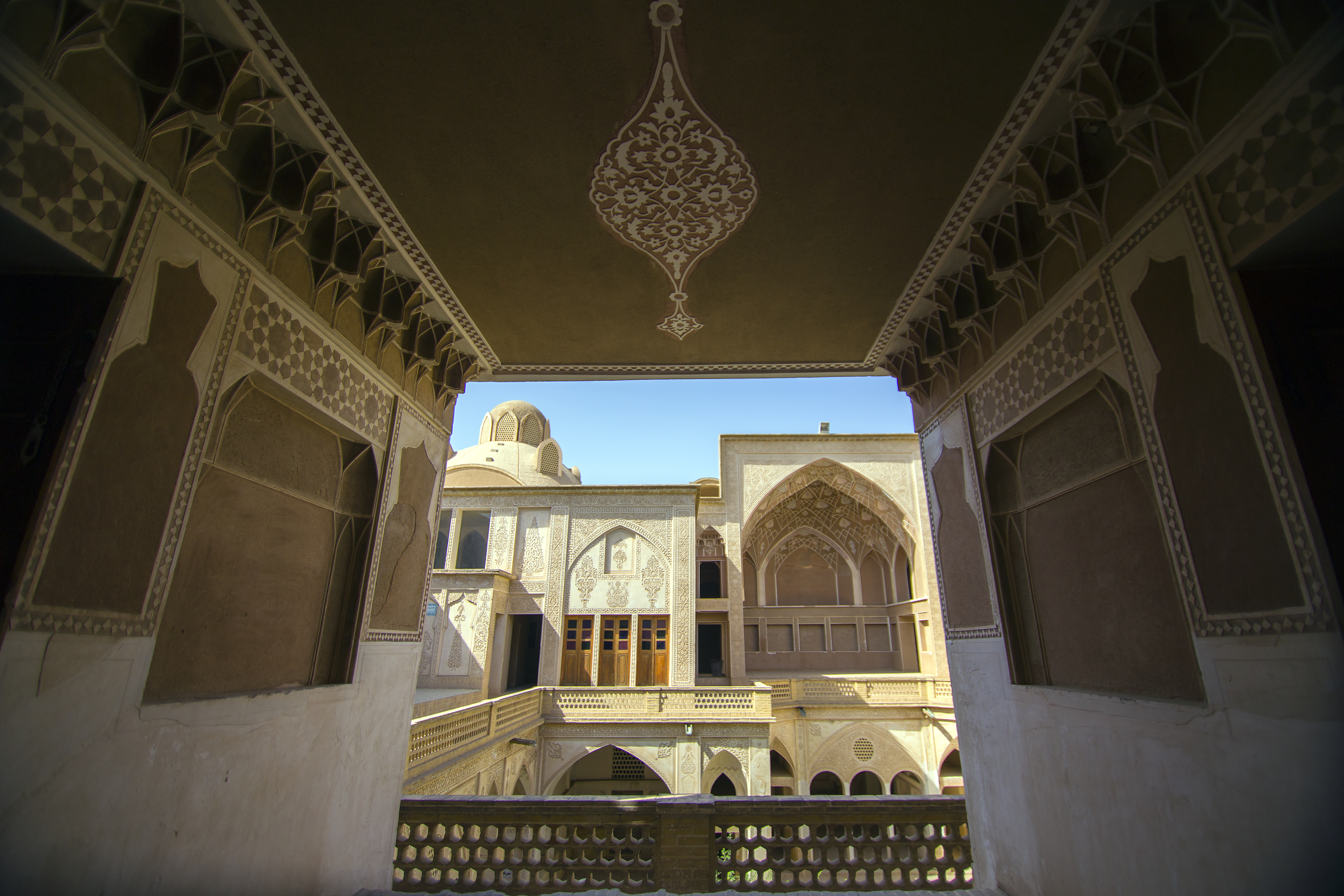
A view from within an upper-floor room inside the Abbāsi House.

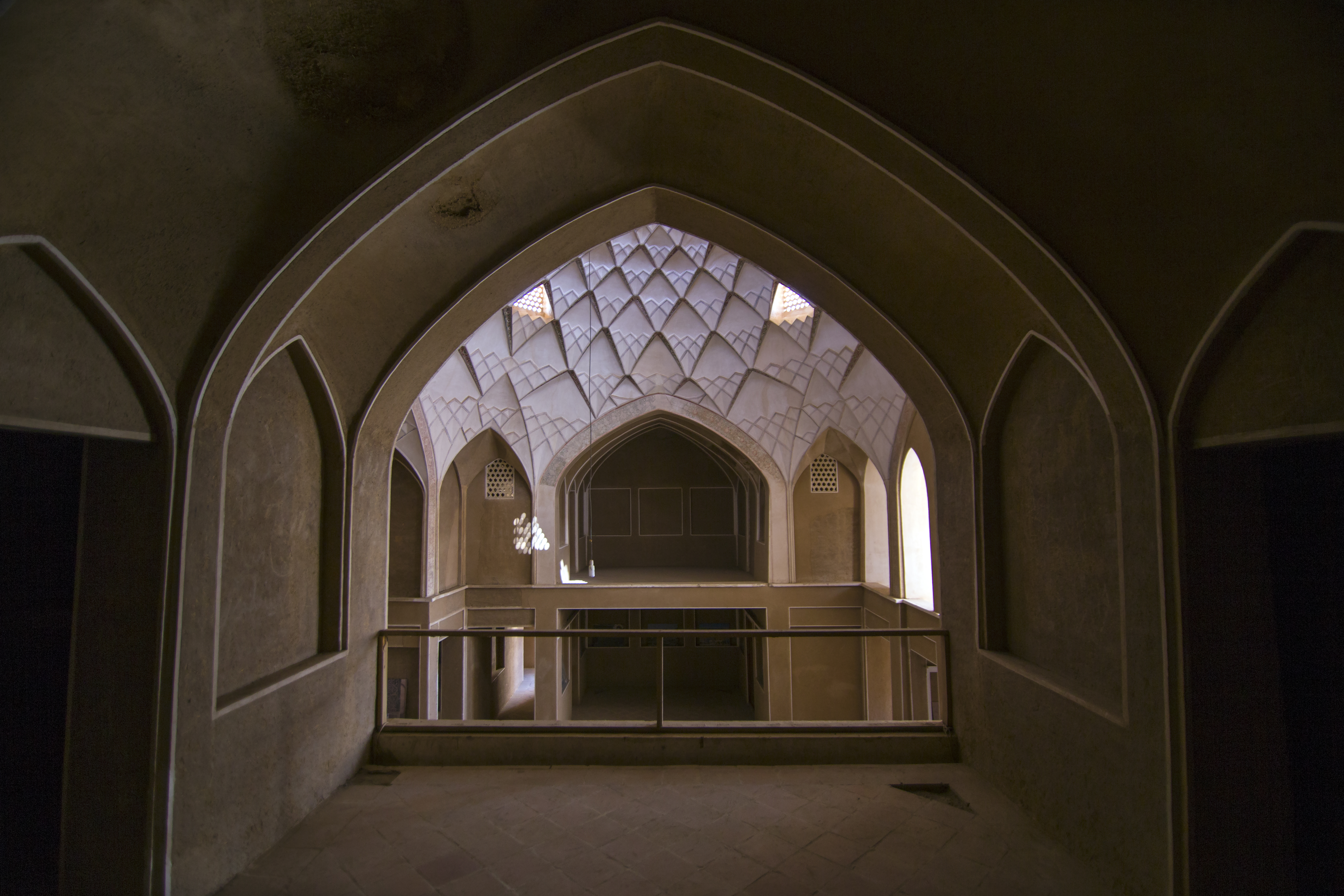
Upper-floor rooms inside the Abbāsi House.

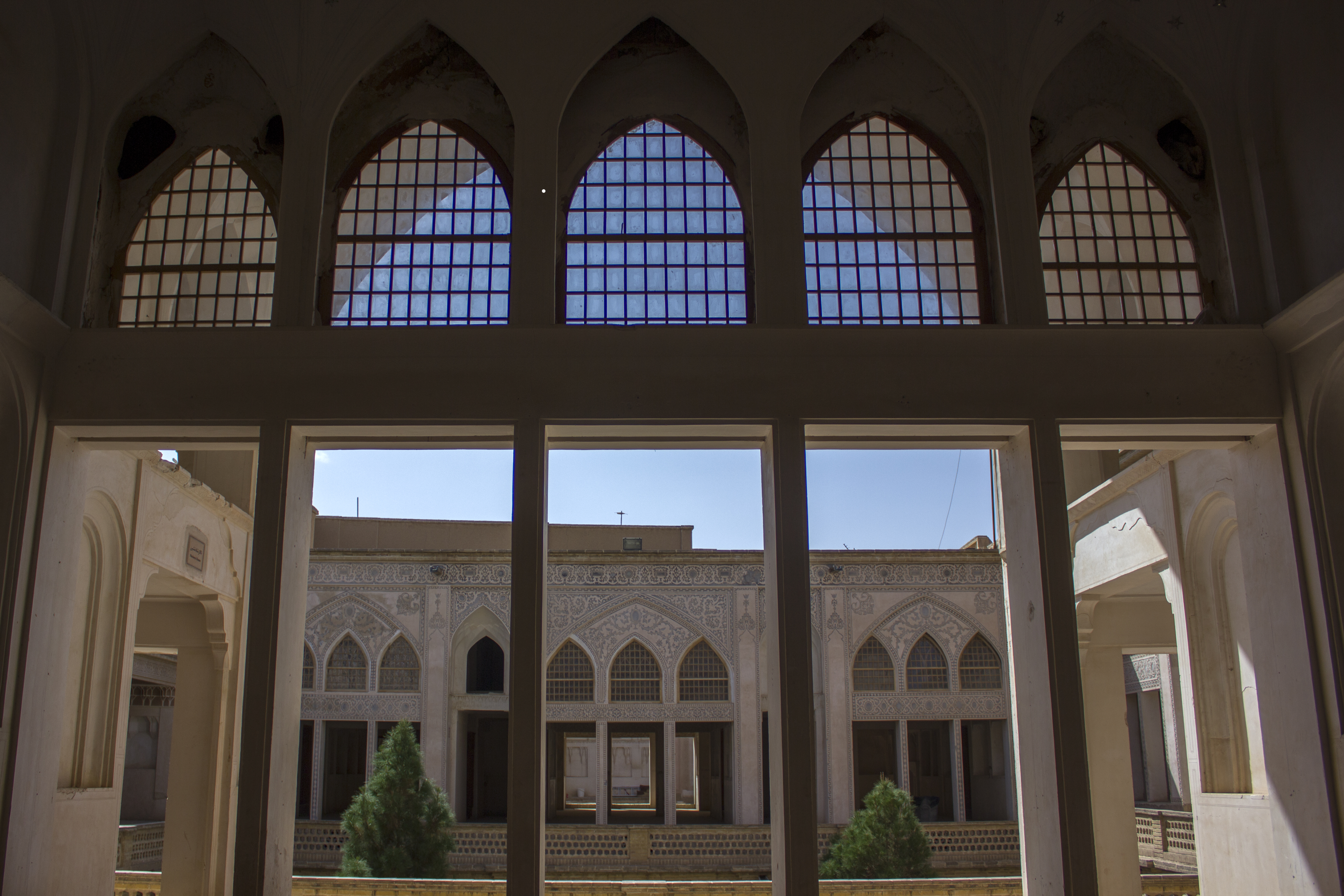
A view from within an upper-floor room inside the Abbāsi House.

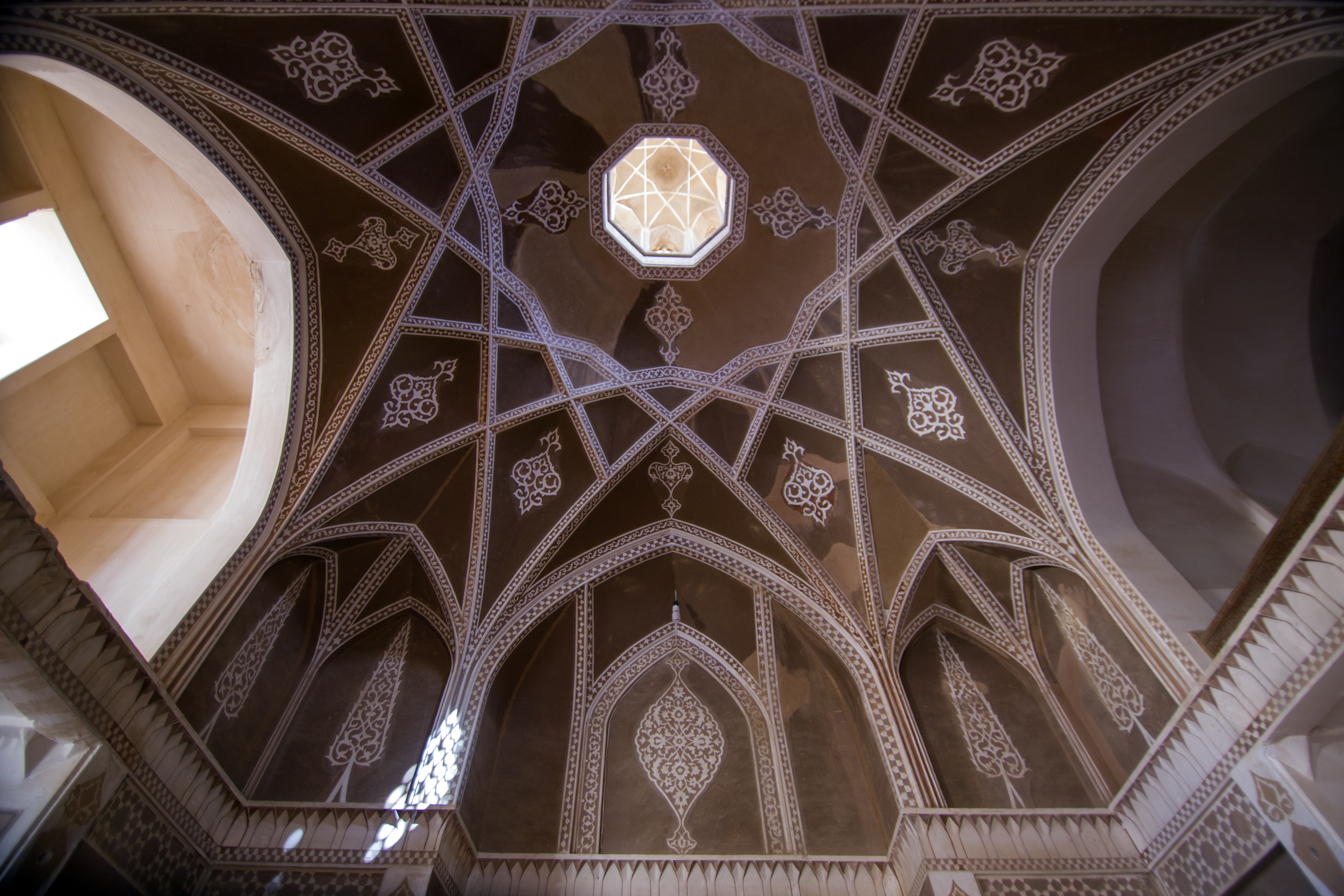
A ceiling inside the Abbāsi House.

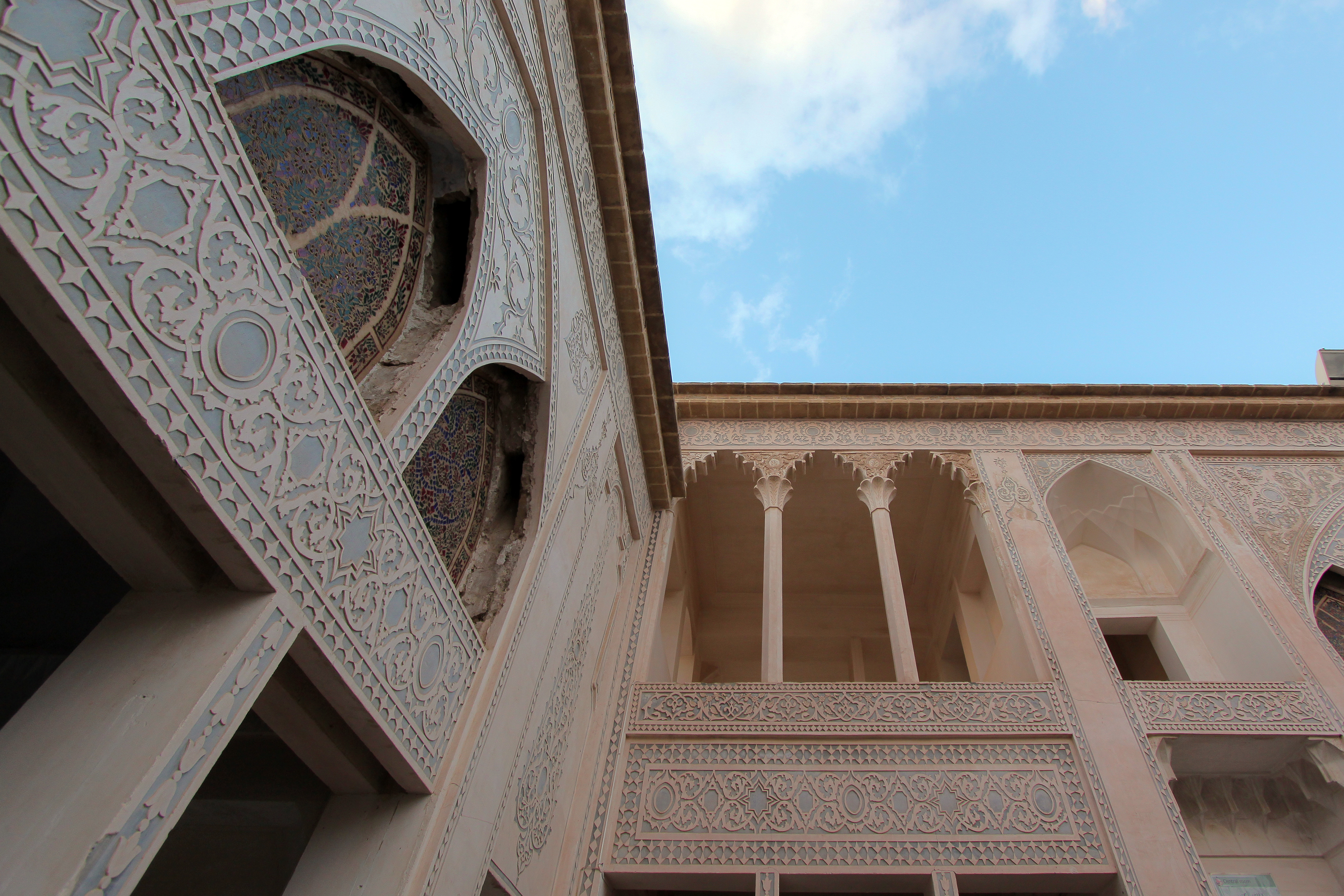
Carvings on the exterior walls of the Abbāsi House.

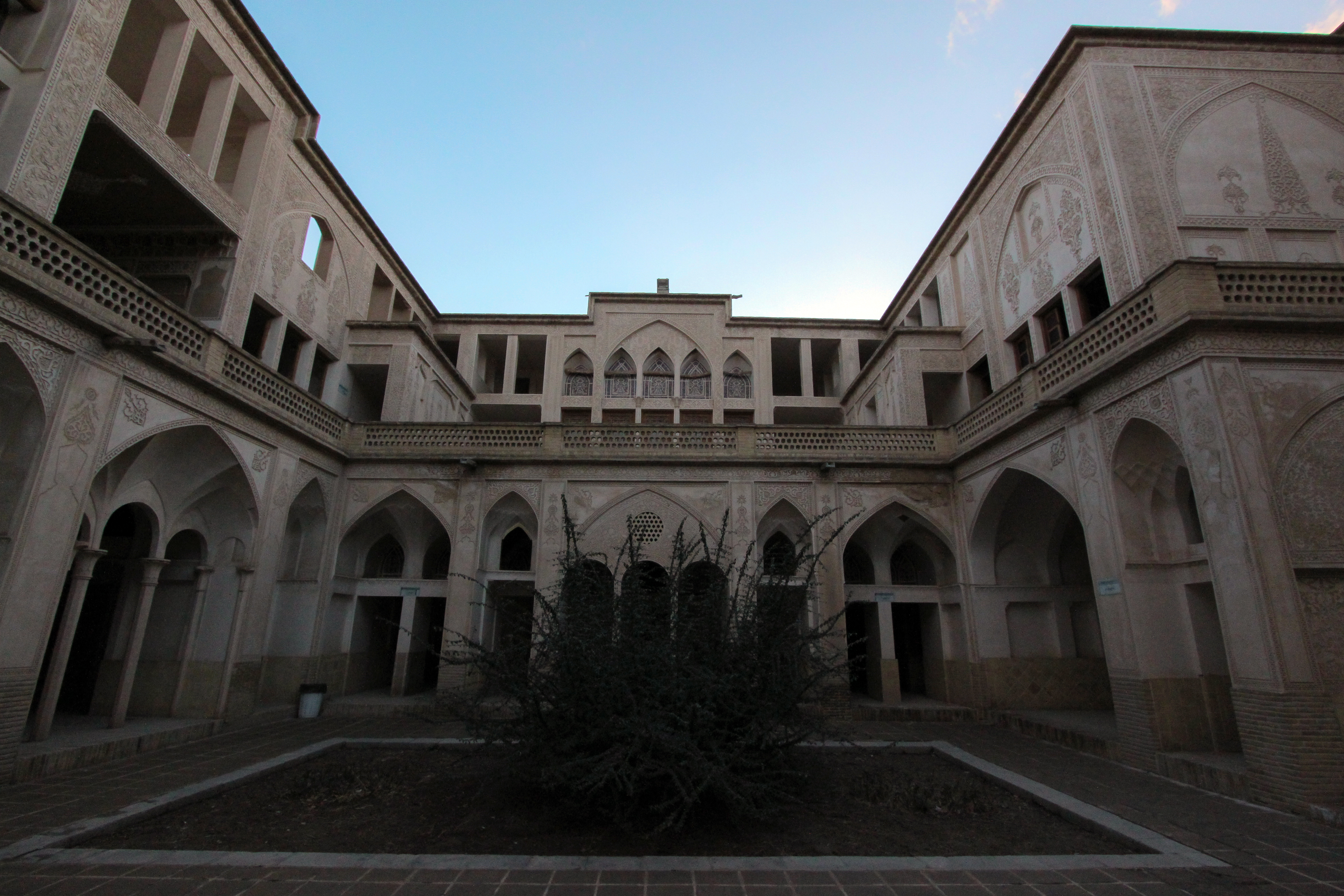
The central courtyard of the Abbāsi House.

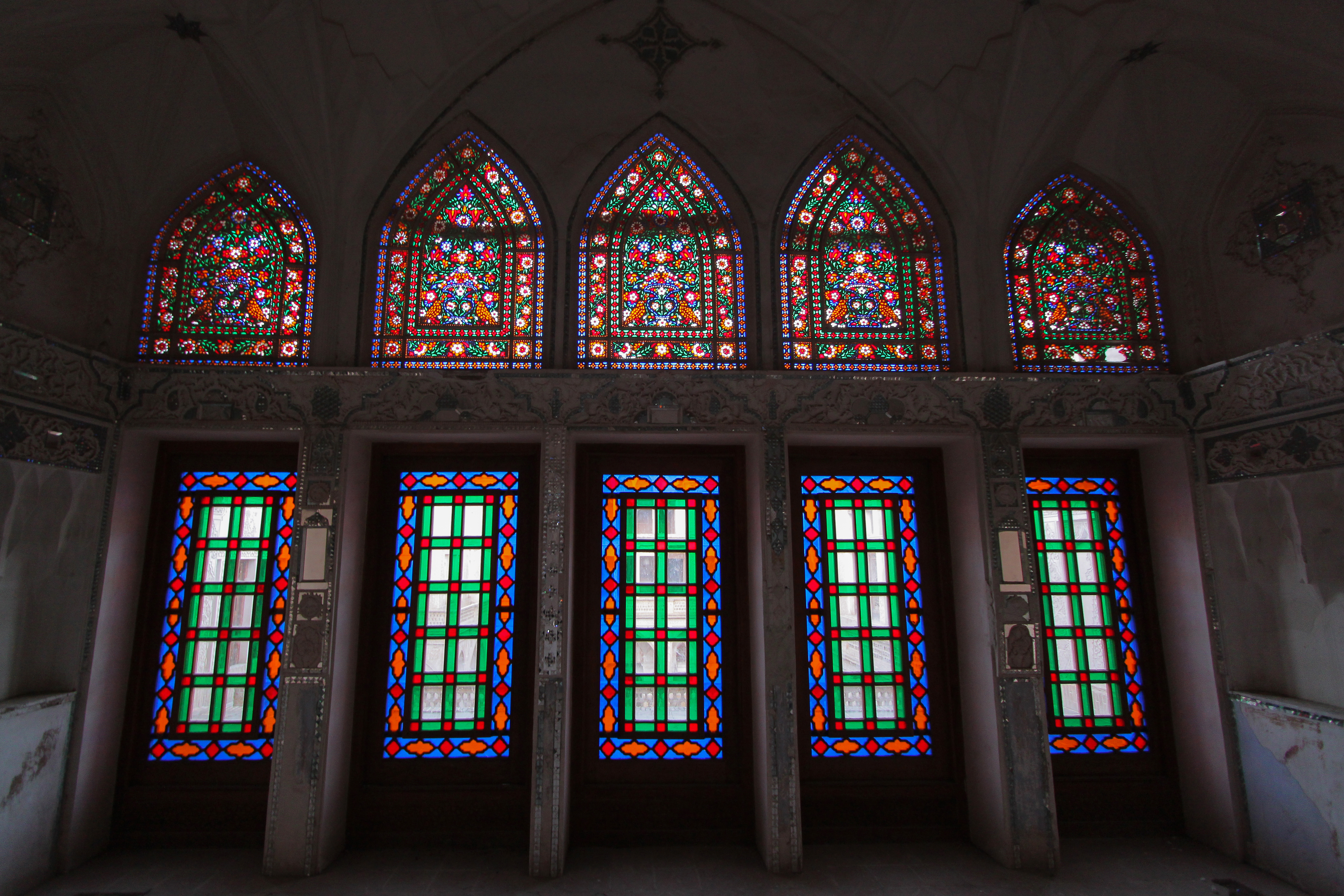
Stained glass work inside the Abbāsi House.

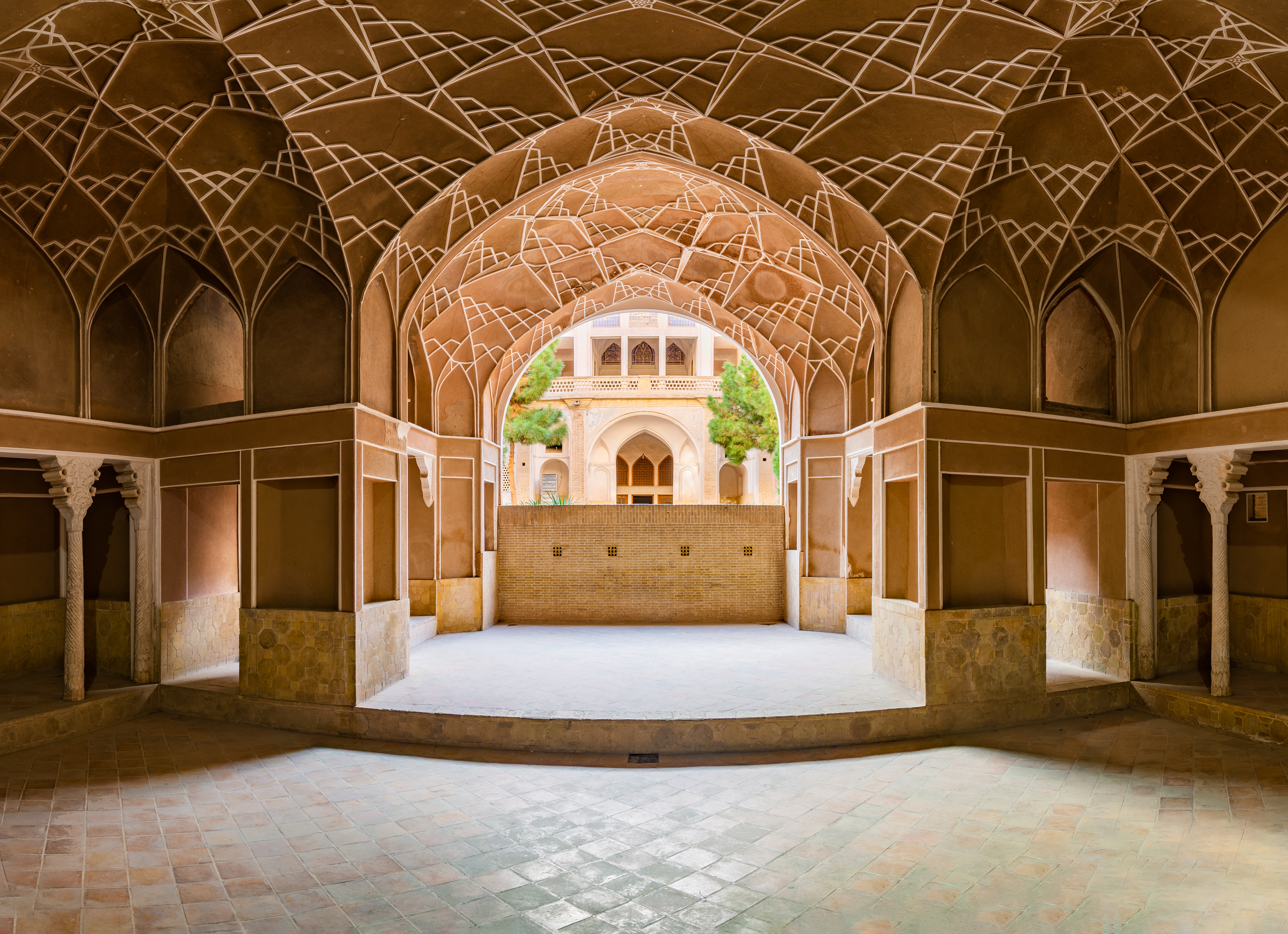
a panoramic HDR image from a section of abbasi house in kashan
