= Iraj Kalantari Taleghani =

Iranian architect (1938–2023)

- ایرج کلانتری
- Born: 1937
- Died: 21 February 2023
- Known for: Architecture
- Relatives: Parviz Kalantari (Brother)

Iraj Kalantari Taleghani (Persian: ایرج کلانتری طالقانی; 1937– 21 February 2023) was an Iranian architect, noted for his contribution to the modernization of Iranian architecture.

He was born in 1938 in Tehran, Iran. In 1964 he graduated with an MA in architecture from the Faculty of Fine Arts in University of Tehran. He taught architecture at the University of Tehran, Azad University, and the University of Science and Technology in Iran. In 1974 he founded Bavand Consultants, at which he held the position of head of the board of directors. On 26 September 2005, Kalantari was chosen as architect of the year by the Society of Iranian Architects and Planners. Among his famous works are the Iranian Embassy and the Ambassador's Residence in Tbilisi, Georgia, Meigun Tourist Complex north of Tehran, Iran, and Sepid Kenar Hotel near the port city of Anzali, Iran. He died on 21 February 2023, at the age of 85.
