= Pouya Khazaeli =

Iranian architect

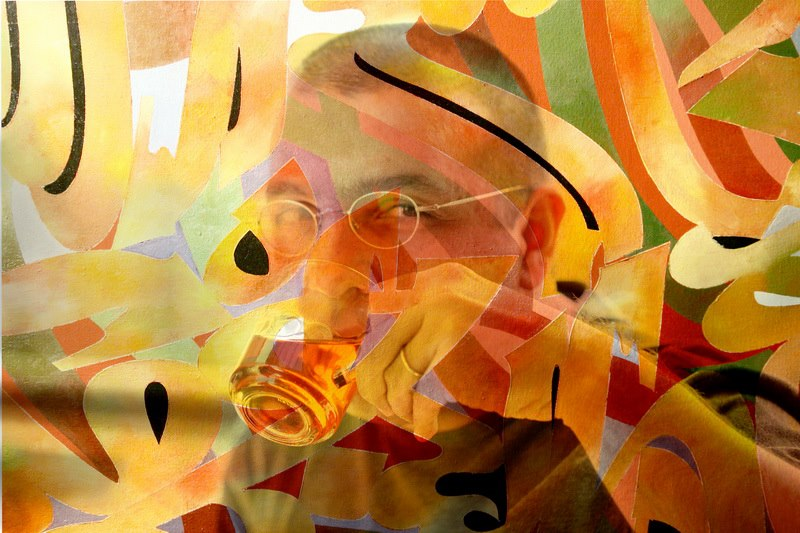
Pouya Khazael, by: Esfandiar Pourmoghadam

Pouya Khazaeli is an Iranian architect. He founded Esfahk Mud Center (E.M.C) in July 2015 to revive what he considers to be the lost spirit of architecture; beyond utility and conceptual design towards the extension of organic settings with reverence to the cultural heritage of the region.

He has worked with Shigeru Ban, Anna Heringer, Bahram Shirdel and Cameron Sinclair. Pouya Khazaeli is the winner of « World Design Impact Prize - 2016 » and « Emerging Architecture Awards - 2015 » and announced as Iranian architect of the year in 2015. He is winner of the first place for the best constructed buildings in Iran 2010.

== Notable projects ==
- RE:BUILD zaatari refugee camp, Jordan (2015)
- Observatory in the desert Esfahak, South Khorasan, Iran (2017)
- Villa in Mazandaran, Iran (2007)
- Bamboo hut, Mazandaran, Iran (2009)
- Villa in Darvishabad, Iran (2010)
