= Abdussamad Esfahani =

Abdul Samad al-Isfahani
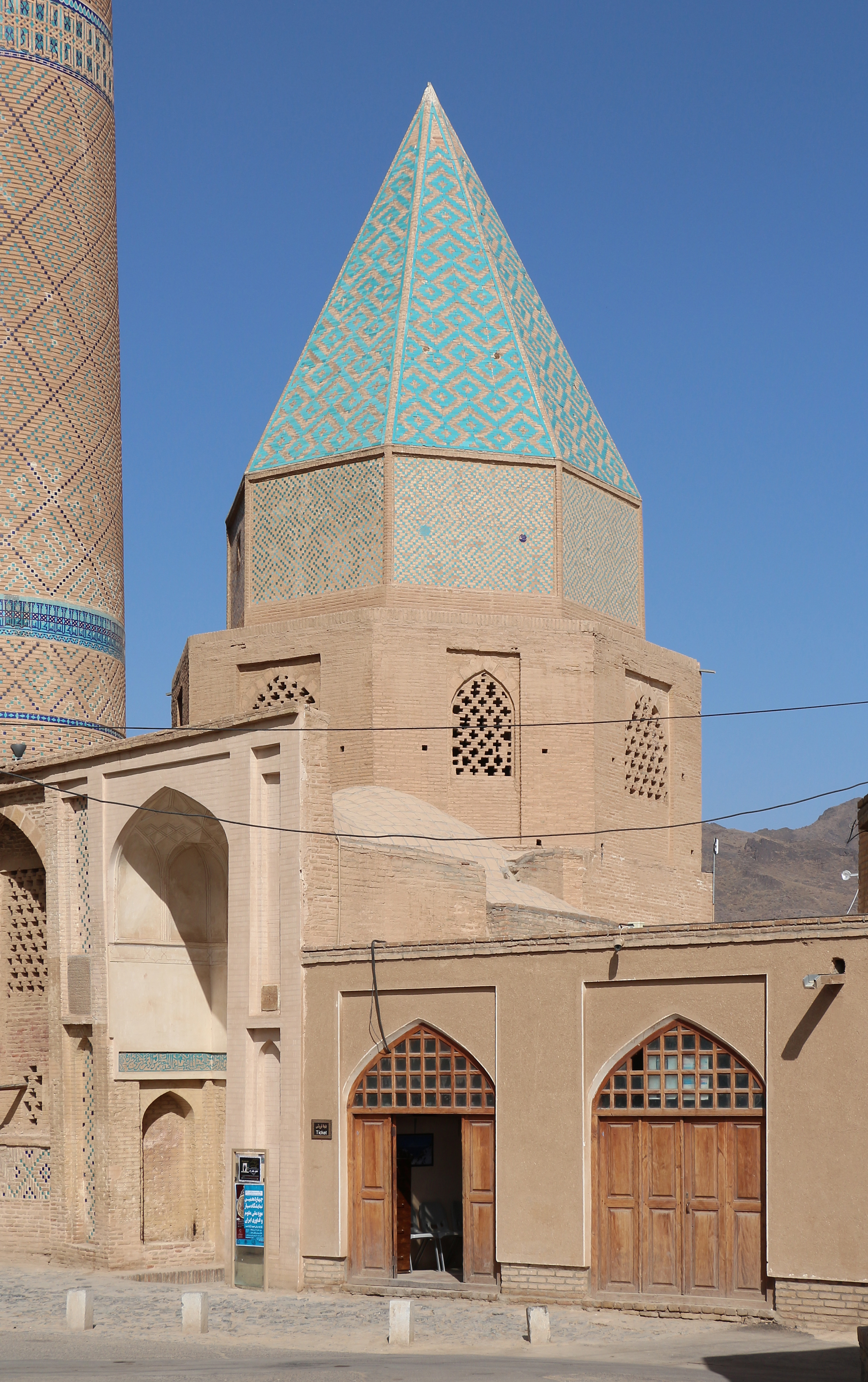
- The tomb of Shaykh Abdul Samad, inside the Jameh Mosque of Natanz

Nur al-Din
- Born: Nur al-Din Abdul Samad ibn Ali al-Isfahani; Isfahan, Iran
- Residence: Natanz
- Died: 1299; Natanz, Iran
- Venerated in: Suhrawardi Sufi Order
- Major shrine: Tomb of Shaykh Abdul Samad, located within the Jameh Mosque of Natanz
- Influences: Najib al-Din Bozgush Shirazni
- Influenced: Abd al-Razzaq Kāshānī

Nur al-Din Abdul Samad ibn Ali al-Isfahani (Persian: نورالدین عبدالصمد نطنزی), or Abdussamad Esfahani was an ascetic sage of the 13th century. Al-Isfahani hailed from Isfahan and stayed in Natanz. He was a student of Najib al-Din Bozgush Shirazni, himself a student of Shihab al-Din Umar Suhrawardi. His importance in Sufism stems from the fact that he was the teacher of Abdul Razzaq al-Kashani, the author of Ta'wilat al-Qur'an, a famous mystical exegesis (interpretation) of the Qur'an. Al-Isfahani died in 1299 and he was succeeded by Shams al-Din Natanzi in his tariqah.

== Tomb ==
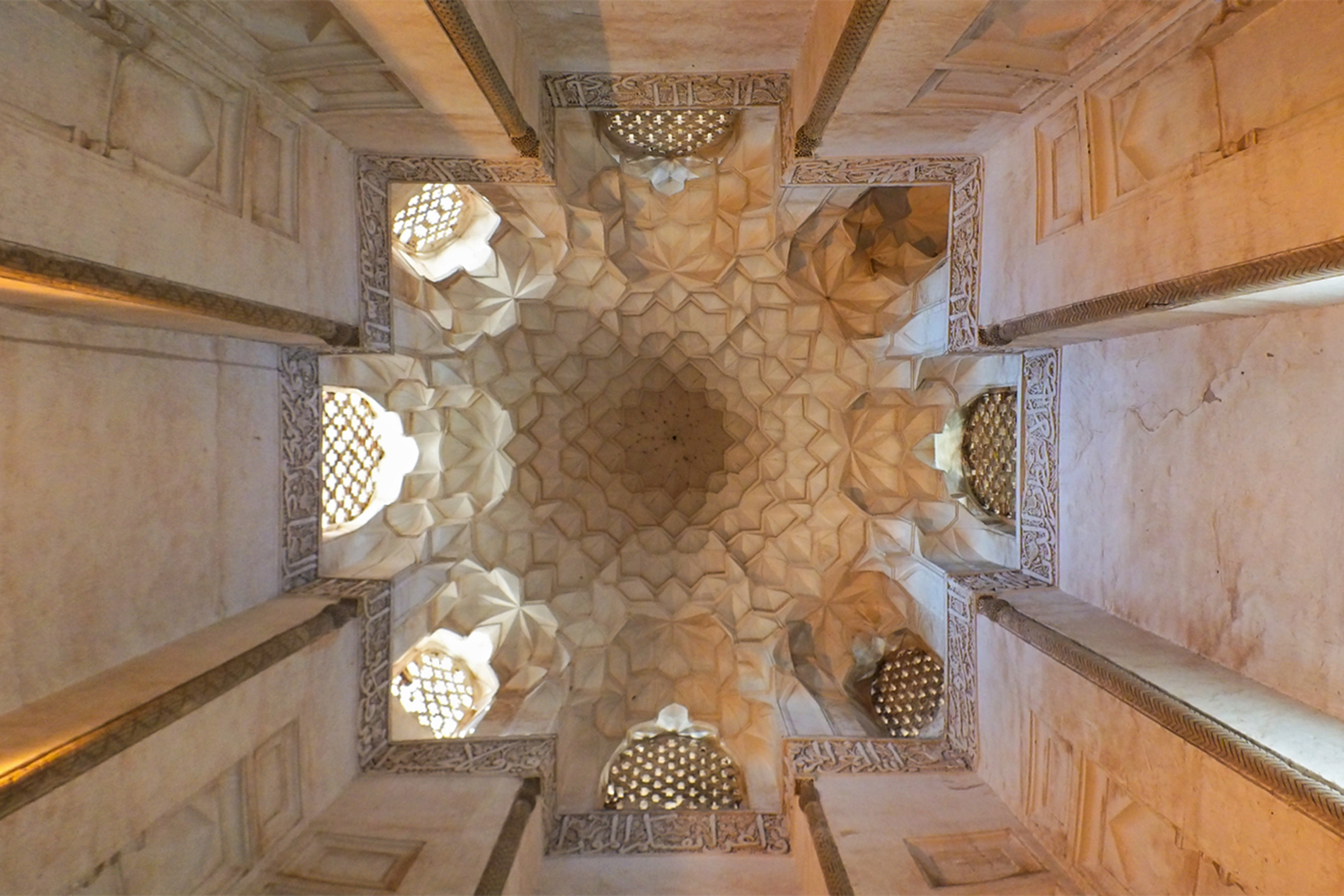
Dome of the Mausoleum of Shaykh 'Abd al-Samad in Natanz (1307, Ilkhanid era)

After his death, Abdul Samad al-Isfahani was buried in Natanz. A shrine was built over his grave under the orders of his disciple Shams al-Din Natanzi, with assistance from the vizier of the Mongol Ilkhanid ruler Muhammad Khudabandah, Zayn al-Din Mastari. The tomb of Al-Isfahani now stands in the center of the Jameh Mosque of Natanz, under its conical dome.
