= Natanz =

City in Isfahan province, Iran

Natanz Persian: نطنز
- City
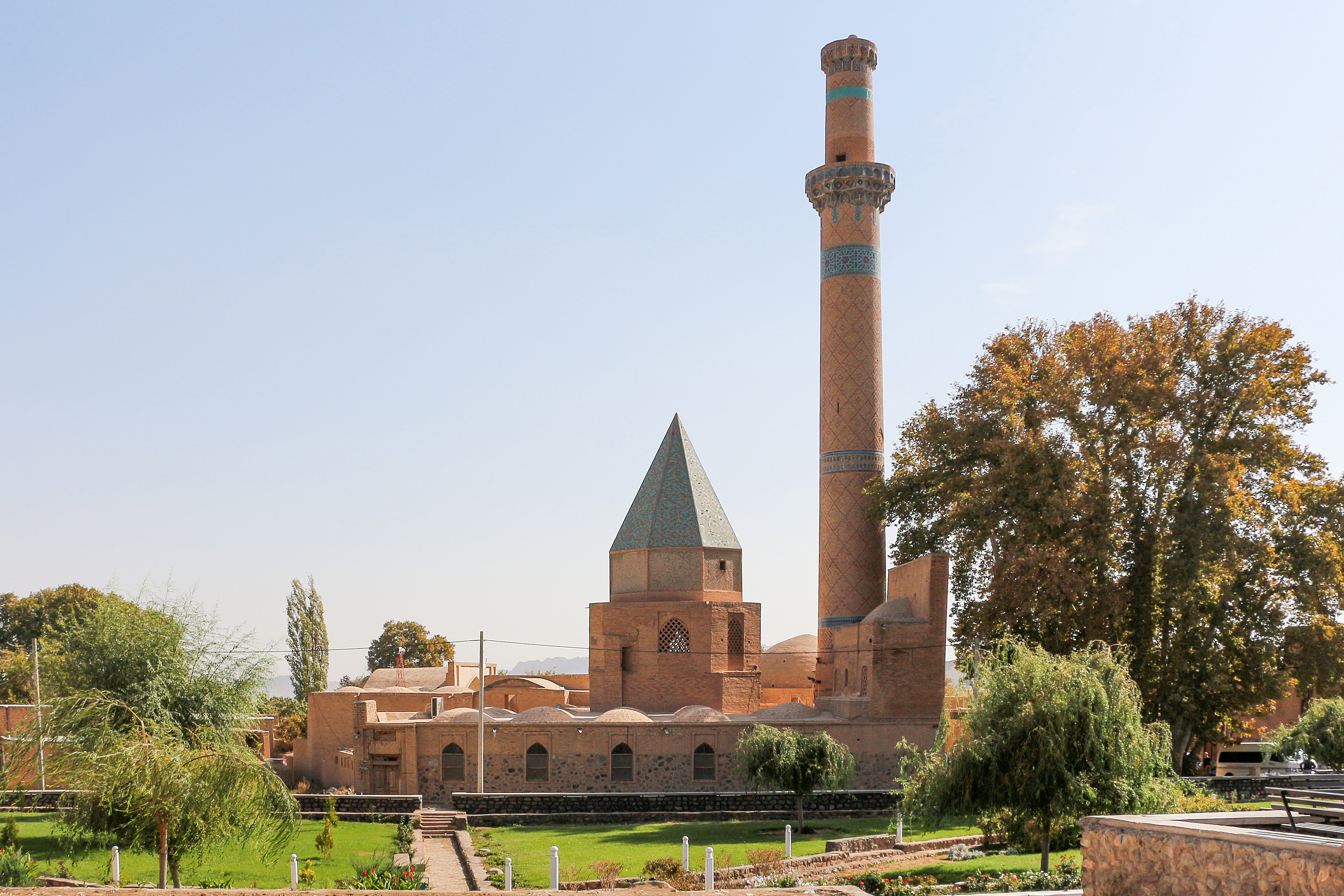
- Shrine Complex of Abd al Samad, built in 1304

- Location within Iran
- Coordinates: 33°30′26″N 51°54′49″E
- Country: Iran
- Province: Isfahan
- County: Natanz
- District: Central

Population (2016)
  - Total: 14,122
- Time zone: UTC+3:30 (IRST)
- Website: natanz.ir

Natanz (Persian: نطنز) (Note: Also romanized as Naţanz) is a city in the Central District of Natanz County, Isfahan province, Iran, serving as capital of both the county and the district. It is 70 kilometres (43 mi) south-east of Kashan.

== Demographics ==
=== Population ===
At the time of the 2006 National Census, the city's population was 12,060 in 3,411 households. The following census in 2011 counted 12,281 people in 3,829 households. The 2016 census measured the population of the city as 14,122 people in 4,564 households.

== Nuclear facility ==
The Natanz nuclear facility, located some 33 km NNW from the town (33°43′N 51°43′E) near a major highway, is generally recognized as Iran's central facility for uranium enrichment.

== Geography ==
=== Location ===
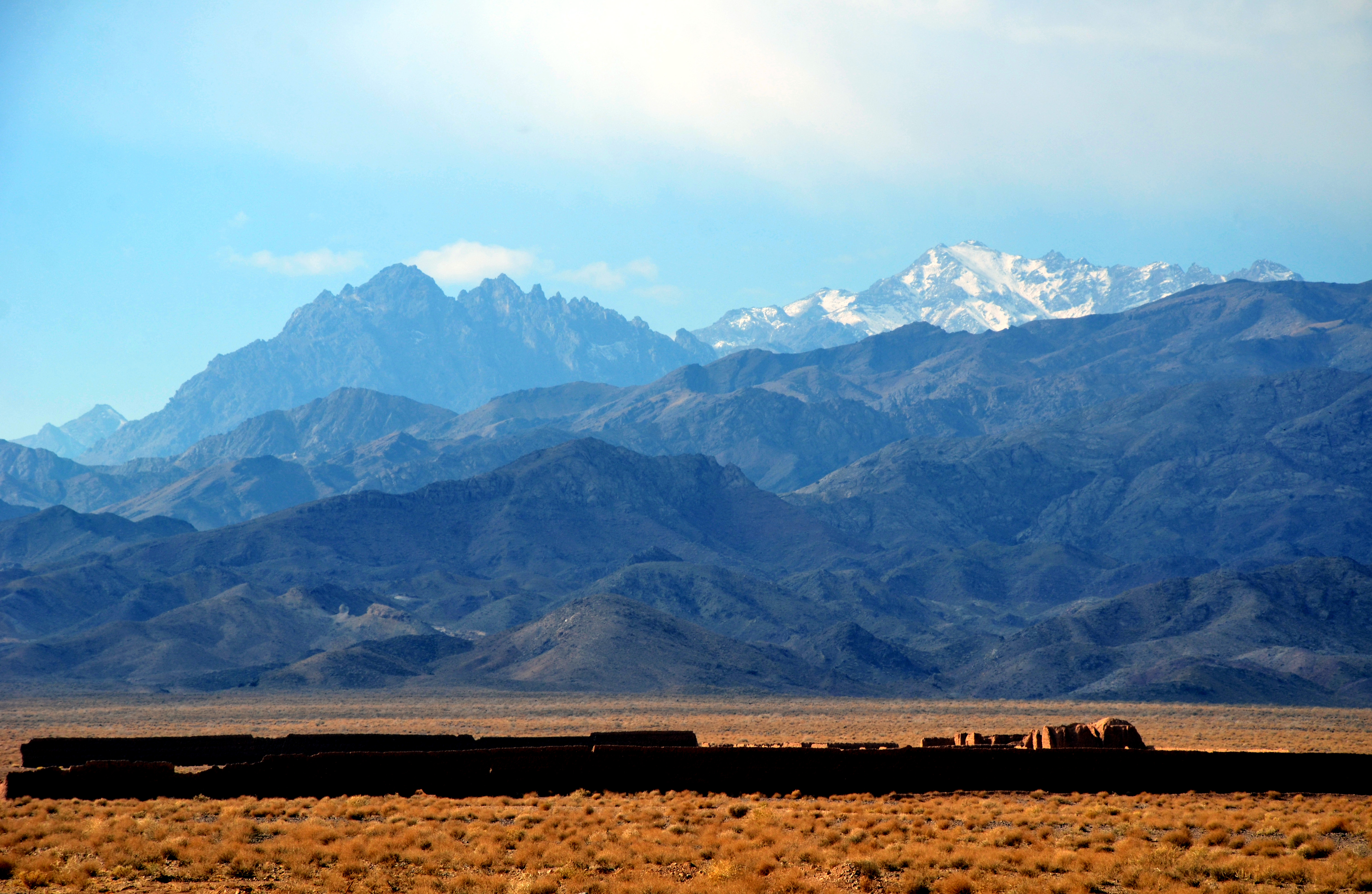
Karkas Mountain Near Natanz

Natanz is located 120 km northeast of Isfahan and on the main north-south highway of Iran. Its altitude is 1666 meters above sea level. The distance between Tehran and Natanz is 326 km, and it takes about 4 hours by car. The Karkas mountain chain (Kuh-e Karkas) (meaning mountain of vultures), at an elevation of 3,899 meters, rises above the town.

=== Climate ===
The average temperature of the city is 15.5 degrees Celsius and the average annual rainfall is 195 mm.

Climate data for Natanz (1992-2005)
Month	Jan	Feb	Mar	Apr	May	Jun	Jul	Aug	Sep	Oct	Nov	Dec	Year
Daily mean °C (°F)	2.1 (35.8)	4.4 (39.9)	8.5 (47.3)	15.0 (59.0)	19.7 (67.5)	25.4 (77.7)	28.2 (82.8)	27.7 (81.9)	23.4 (74.1)	17.0 (62.6)	9.5 (49.1)	4.6 (40.3)	15.5 (59.8)
Average precipitation mm (inches)	34.0 (1.34)	23.2 (0.91)	43.3 (1.70)	28.6 (1.13)	19.8 (0.78)	2.1 (0.08)	0.5 (0.02)	0.9 (0.04)	0.1 (0.00)	5.6 (0.22)	16.6 (0.65)	20.6 (0.81)	195.3 (7.68)
Average snowy days	3.6	2.6	1.3	0	0	0	0	0	0	0	0.1	1.9	9.5
Average relative humidity (%)	57	47	42	37	31	21	22	18	21	31	45	55	36
Average dew point °C (°F)	−5.4 (22.3)	−6.2 (20.8)	−4.4 (24.1)	0.0 (32.0)	1.8 (35.2)	1.7 (35.1)	4.1 (39.4)	1.6 (34.9)	0.0 (32.0)	−0.7 (30.7)	−2.5 (27.5)	−4.0 (24.8)	−1.2 (29.9)
Source: IRIMO

== Agriculture ==
Agriculture is Natanz' major industry. Local produce includes beets, walnuts, and pomegranates. The city is noted for its pears and its saffron, most of which is exported. Natanz' climate is well-suited for saffron, and the city has produced as much as 1,600 kg of dry saffron in a year.

== Historical monuments ==
It is known as the shrine of Abd as-Samad. Elements in the present complex date from 1304 with subsequent additions and restorations, such as the Khaneqah and Muqarnas vault. The tomb honors the Sufi Sheikh Abd al-Samad, and was built by the Sheikh's disciple, the Ilkhanid vizier Zain al-Din Mastari.

== Gallery ==
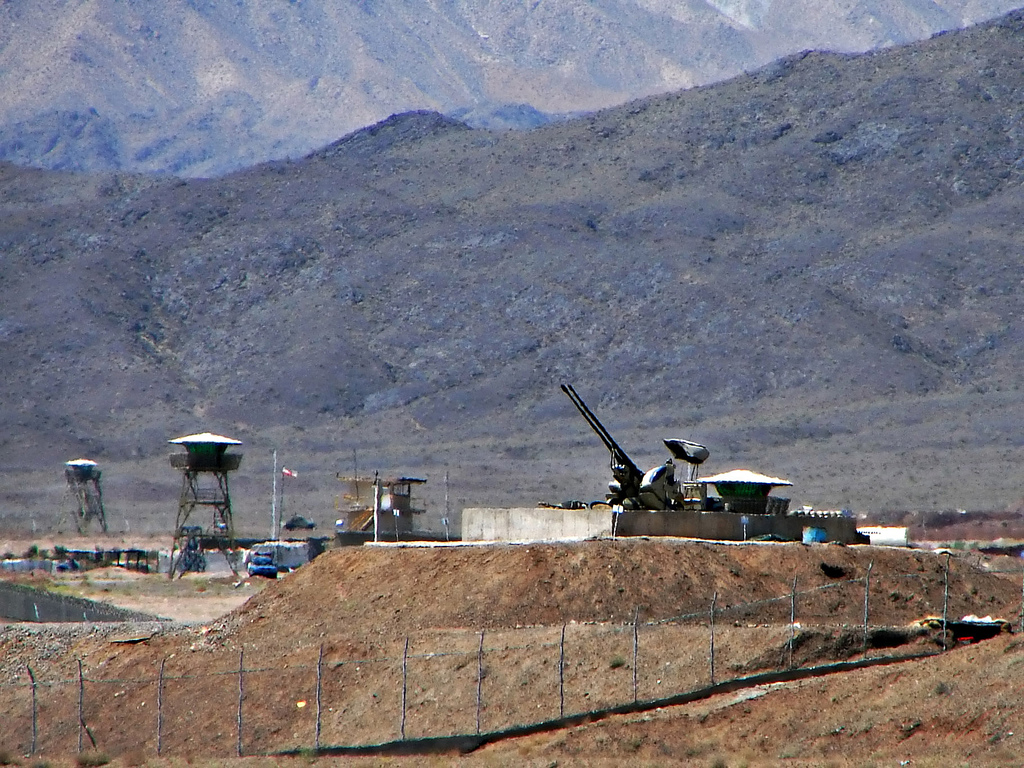
Anti-aircraft guns guarding Natanz nuclear facility

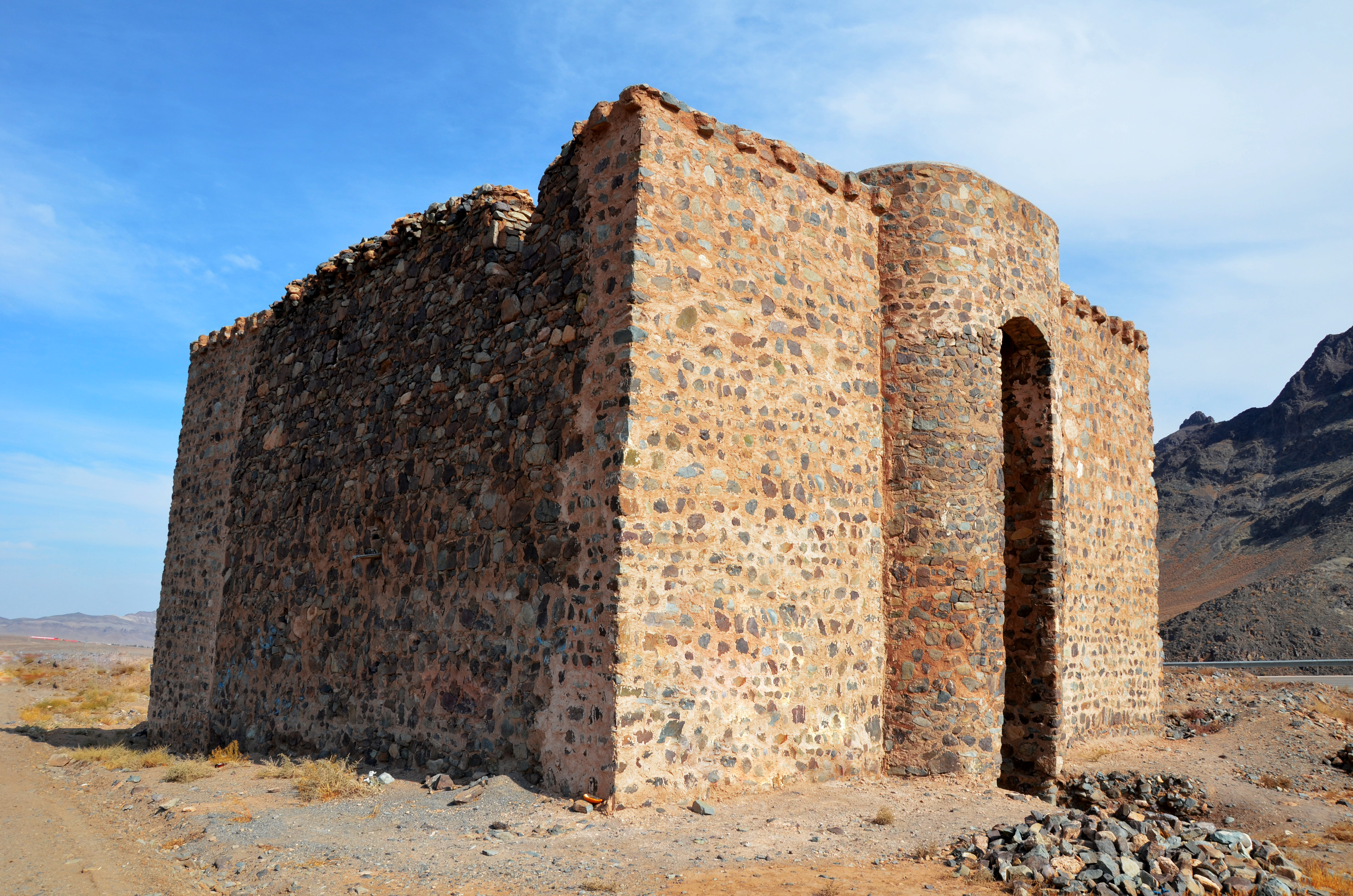
Natanz Stone Fortress

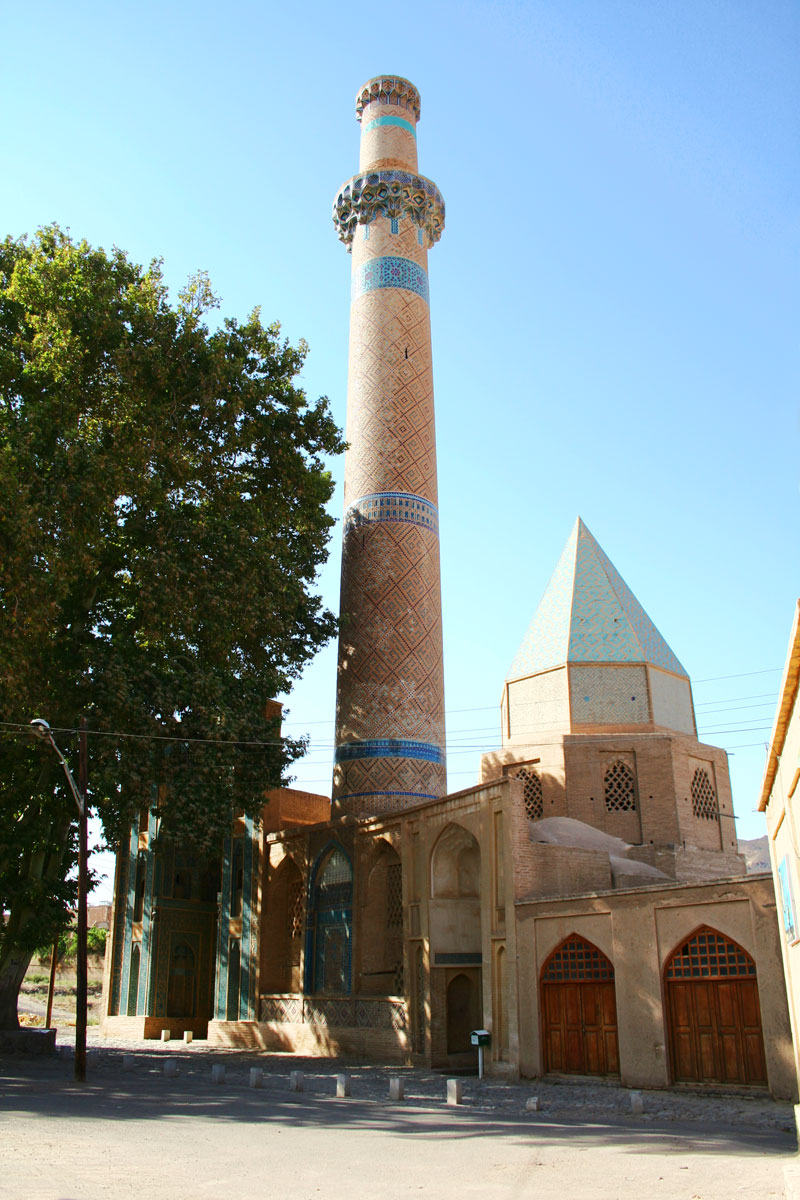
Natanz mosque next to the old Chenar

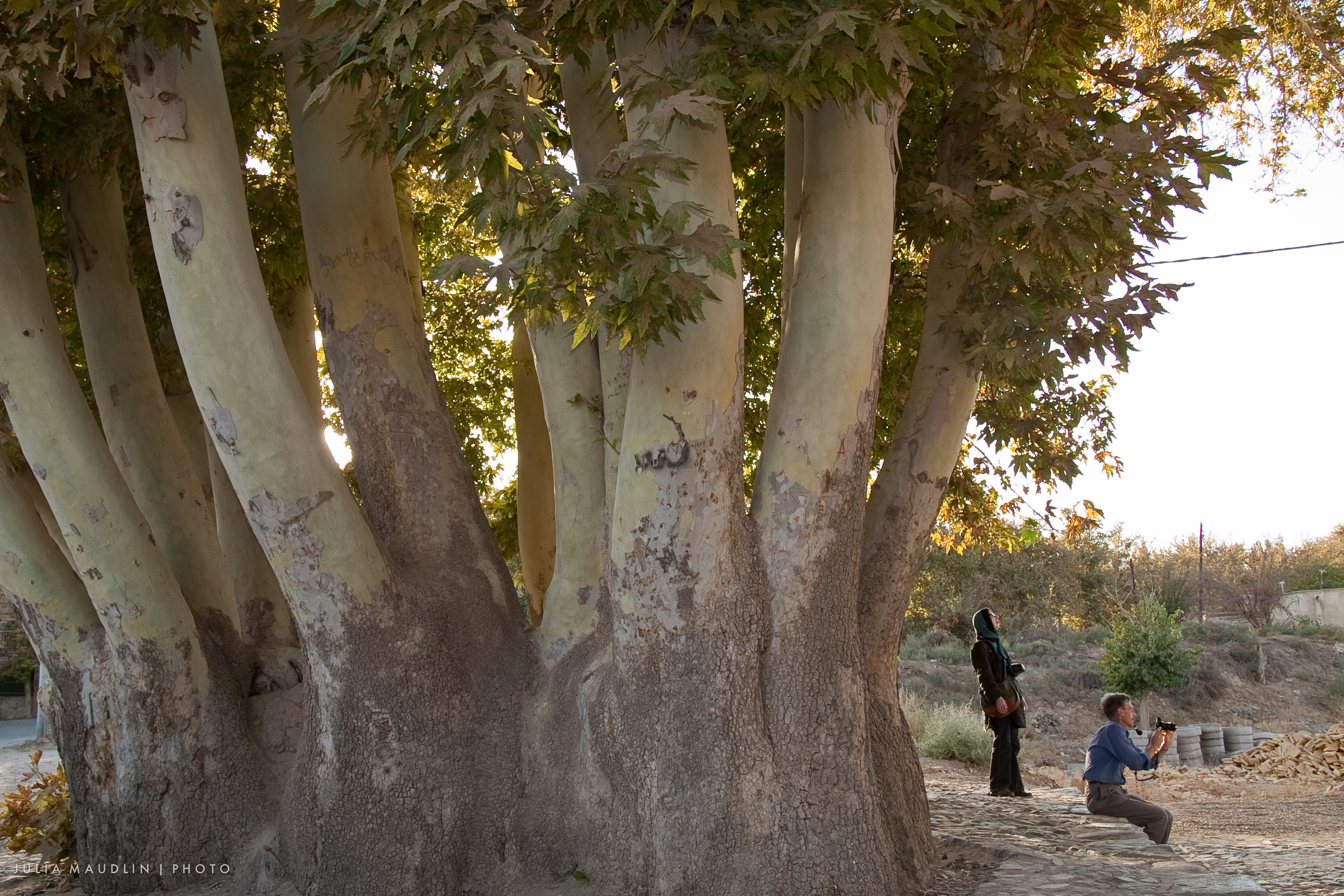
Ancient tree of Natanz

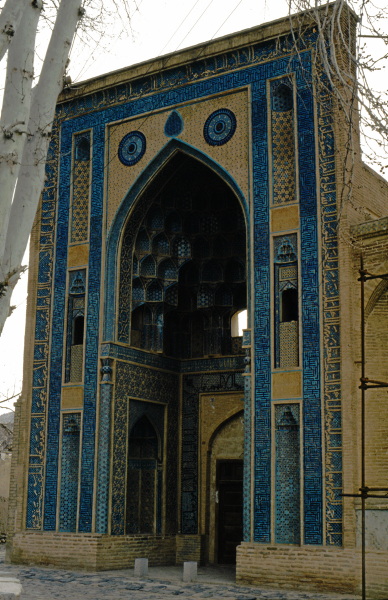
Portal of Abd al-Samad complex

== See also ==
- Fordow Fuel Enrichment Plant
- Nuclear facilities in Iran
- Stuxnet computer worm

Media related to Natanz at Wikimedia Commons
