= Kashan =

City in Isfahan province, Iran

Kashan Persian: کاشان
- City
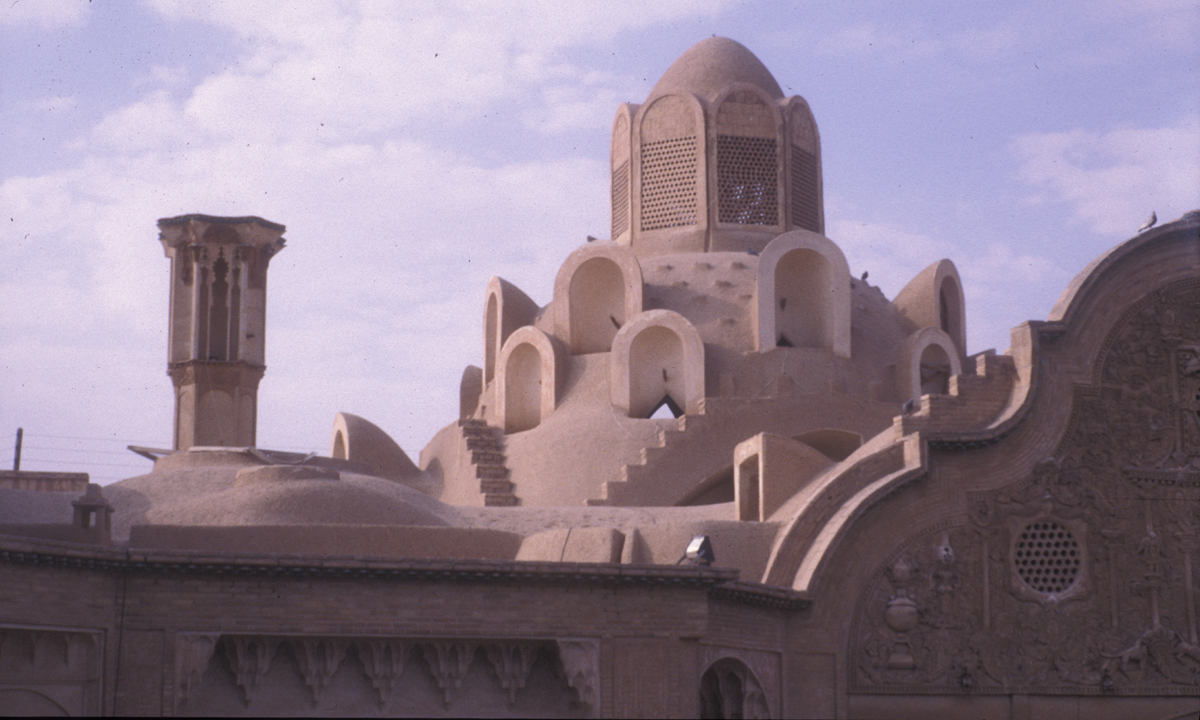
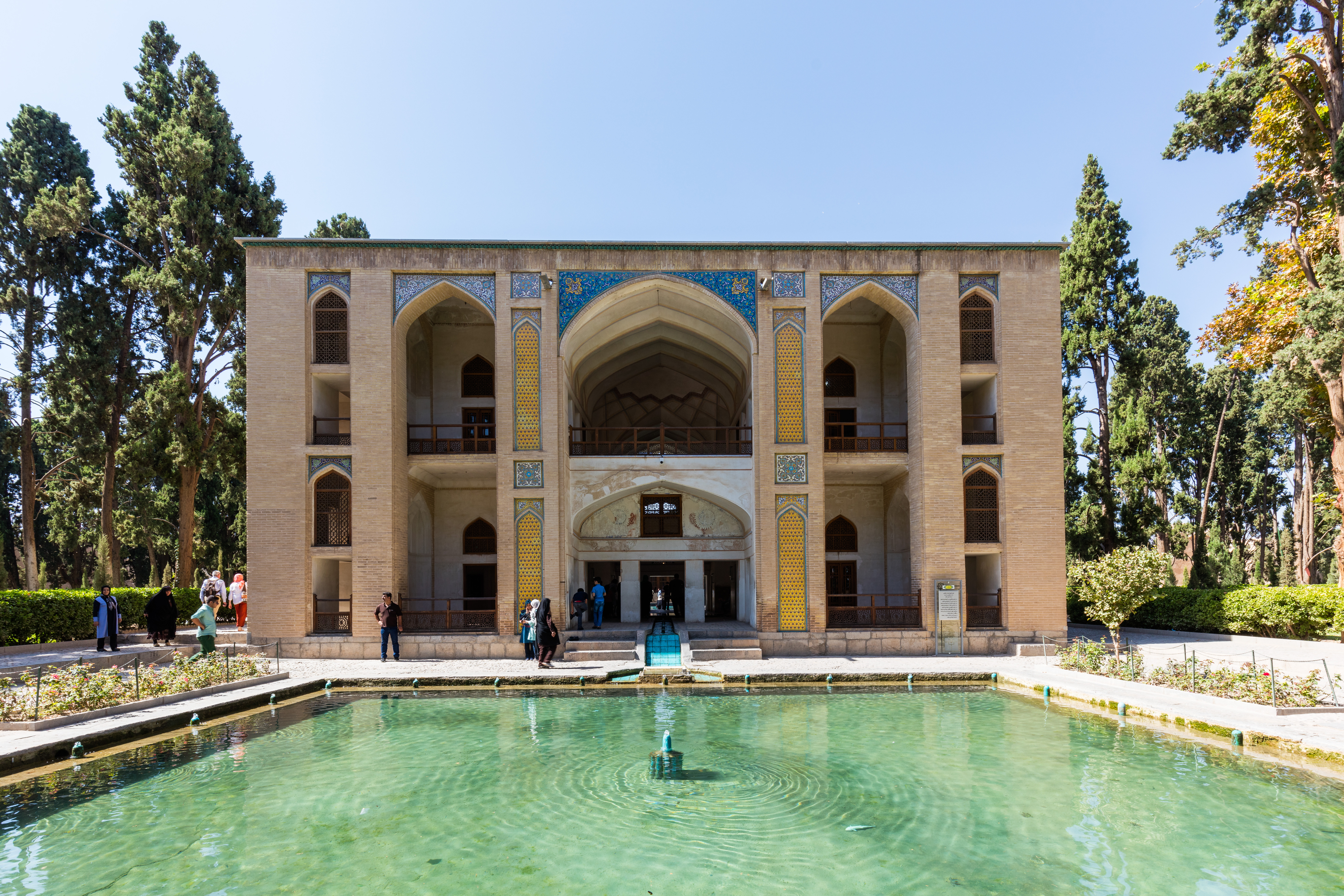
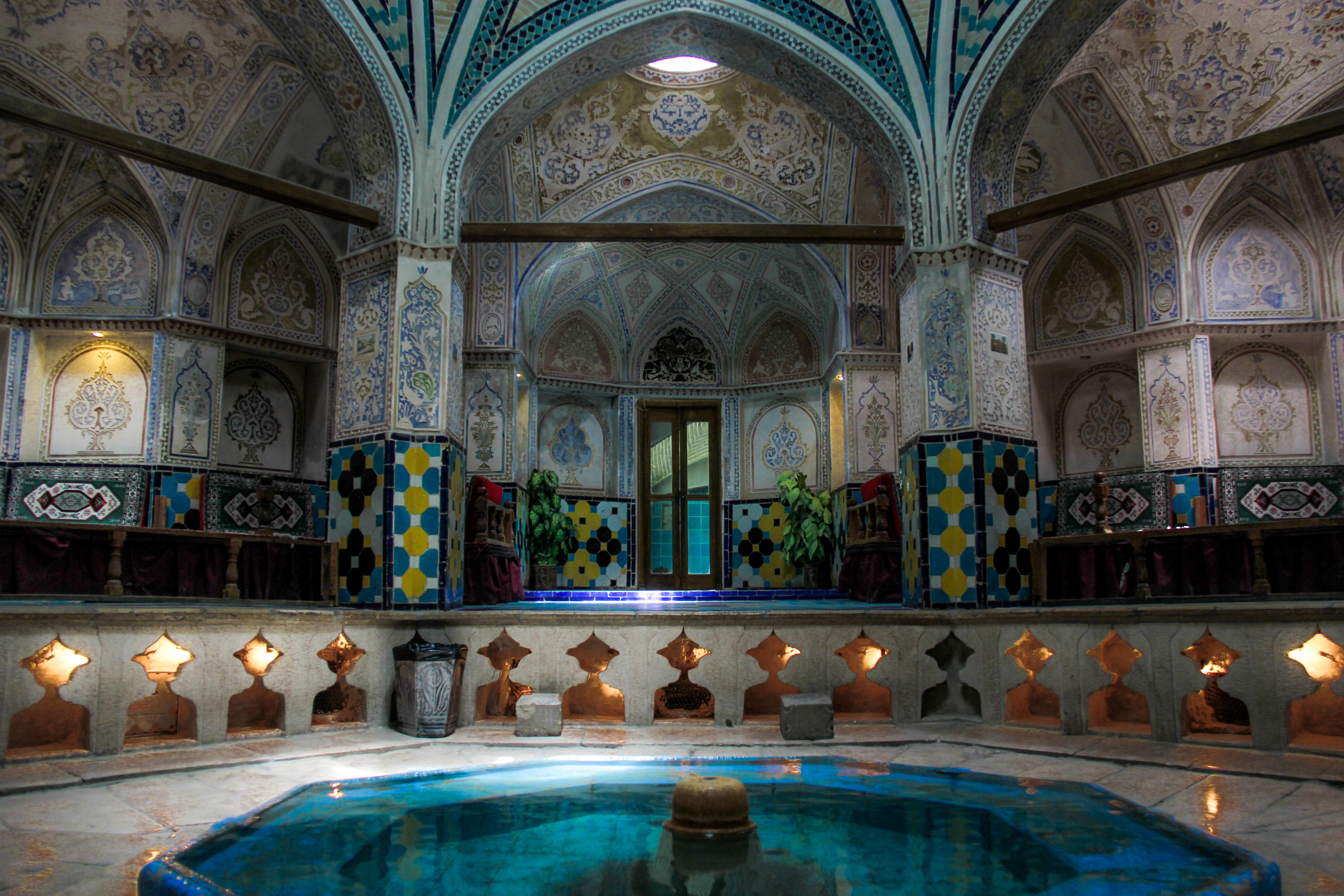
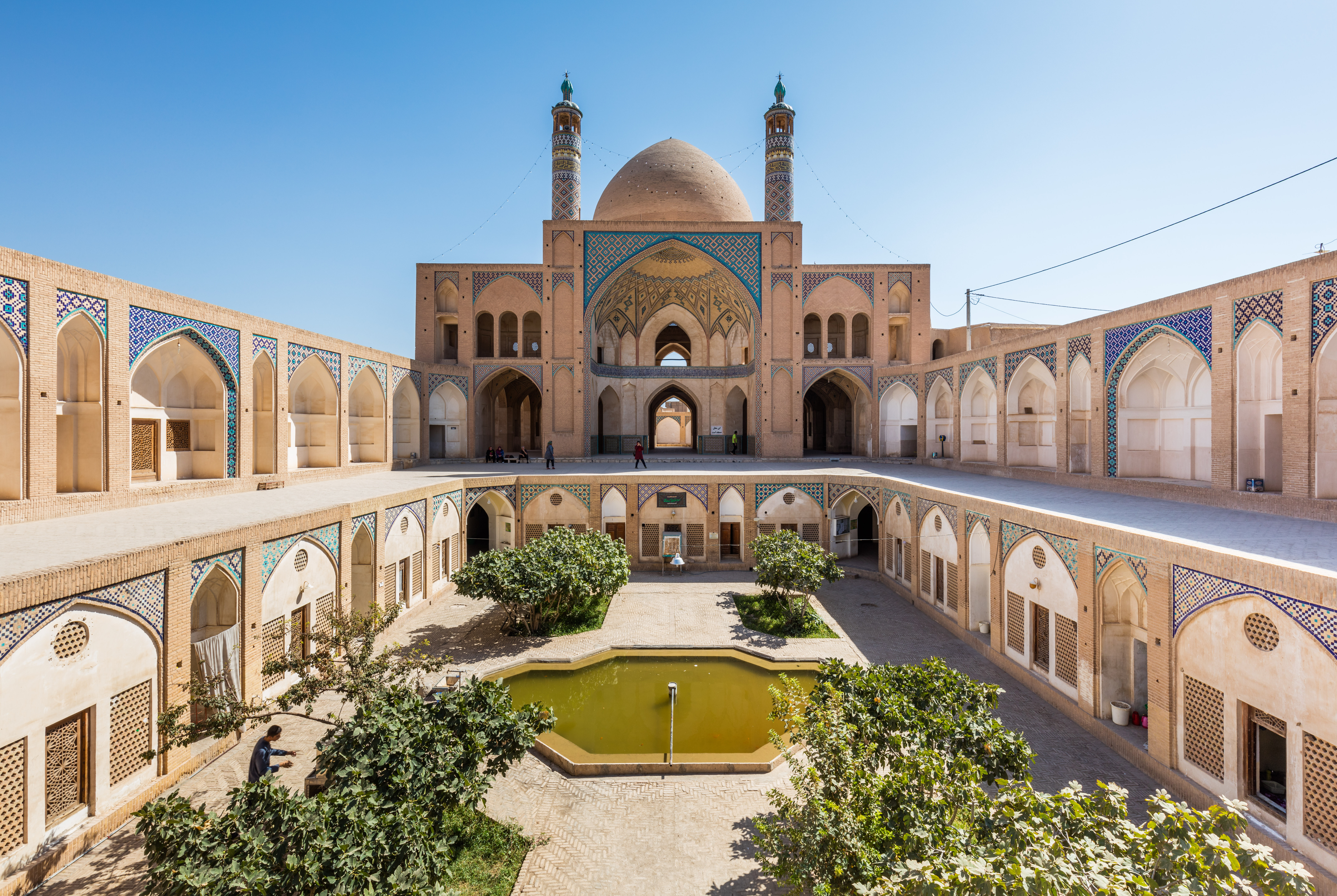
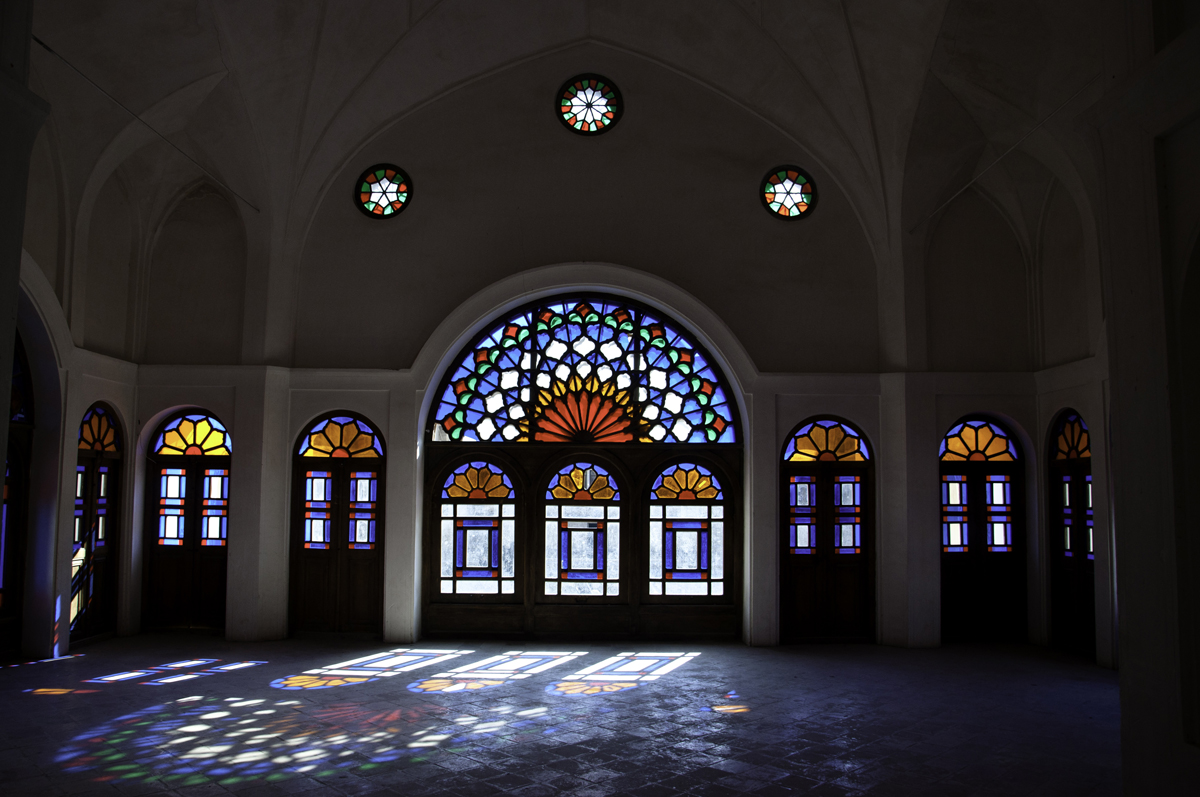
- Clockwise from the top: Borujerdi House, Sultan Amir Ahmad Bathhouse, Tabatabai House, Agha Bozorg Mosque, Fin Garden.

- Location in Iran
- Coordinates: 33°58′57″N 51°25′57″E
- Country: Iran
- Province: Isfahan
- County: Kashan
- District: Central
- Established

Government
  - Mayor: Kioumars Firouzpour

Population (2016)
  - Urban: 304,487
  - Metro: 432,557
- Time zone: UTC+3:30 (IRST)
- Website: www.kashan.ir

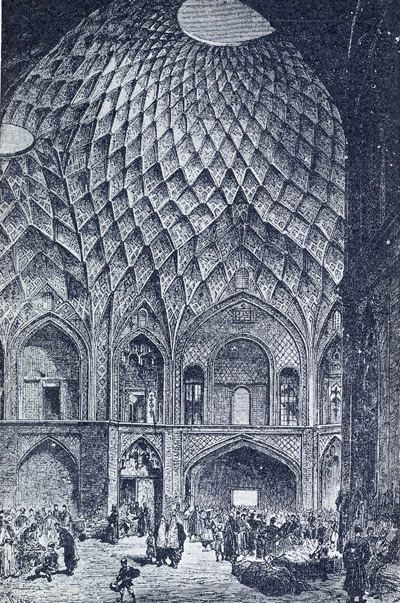
Timcheh-ye Amin od-Dowleh, Kashan Bazaar (19th century). Persian architects used these structures to naturally decrease temperatures, regulate sunlight, and ventilate the interior spaces during the daytime.

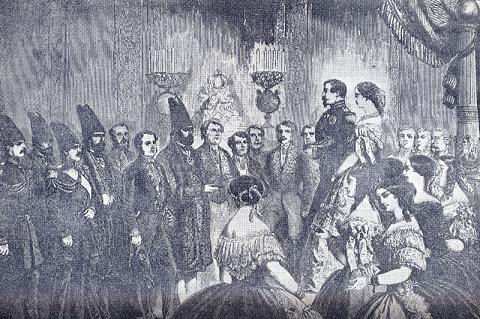
Amin-o-Dowleh, Persian royal envoy to the court of Napoleon III.

Kashan (Persian: کاشان; [kɒːˈʃɒːn]) (Note: Also romanized as Kāšān and Kāshān; also known as Cassan and Qashan) is a city in the Central District of Kashan County, in the northern part of Isfahan province, Iran, serving as capital of both the county and the district. Kashan is one of the oldest cities in Iran and is one of the oldest continuously inhabited cities in the world.

== History ==
Earliest evidence of human presence around Kashan date back to Paleolithic period that have been found at Neyasar, Kaftar Khoun and Sefid-Ab. The Tepe Sialk, linked to the Zayandeh River Culture, dates back to around the 6th millennium BC. Middle Paleolithic stone tools were discovered at travertine spring of Niasar and the travertine of Kaftar Khoun. Upper Paleolithic groups were living around Sefid-Ab spring at SW of Kashan.

It is uncertain as to when what is now Kashan was established. By some accounts, although not all, Kashan was the origin of the three wise men who followed the star that guided them to Bethlehem to witness the nativity of Jesus, as recounted in the Bible. For example, medieval traveler Friar Odoric of Pordenone related this story in 1330 after having visited there.

According to a legend dating from the Safavid era, Abu Lu'lu'a, the Persian skilled craftsman who was enslaved by the Islamic conquerors and who eventually assassinated the caliph Umar ibn al-Khattab in 644, fled to Kashan after the assassination. The shrine that was built over his supposed tomb is one of Kashan's landmarks (see gallery below).

During the Timurid era, Kashan was patronized by Ulugh Beg, grandson of Timur. Thereafter, Kashan successively came under the rule of the Qara Qoyunlu, and then the Aq Qoyunlu. Kashan was also a leisure vacation spot for the Safavid shahs.

The earthquake of 1778 leveled the city of Kashan and all the edifices of Abbas the Great, leaving 8000 casualties. However, the city was rebuilt.

The city was home to the Judeo-Kashani community. Their language is an endangered language of the West Iranian language family.

This city is also known as Dar al-Mominin.

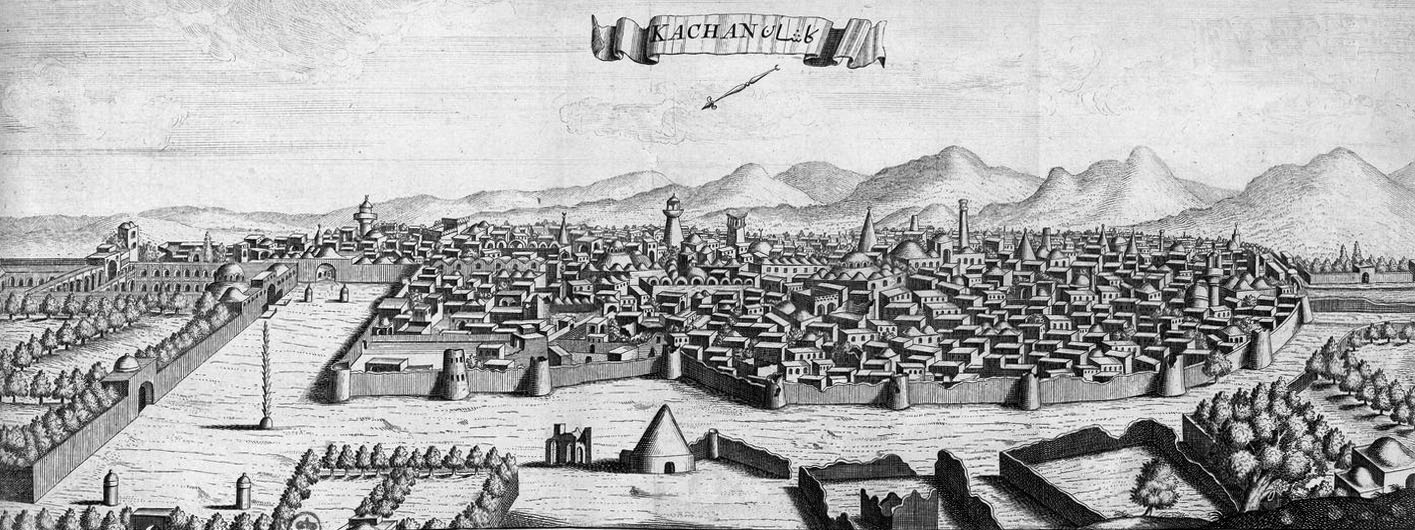
a view of Kashan around 17th century from Jean Chardin.

== Demographics ==
=== Population ===
At the time of the 2006 National Census, the city's population was 248,789 in 67,464 households. The following census in 2011 counted 275,325 people in 80,015 households. The 2016 census measured the population of the city as 304,487 people in 91,935 households.

== Geography ==
Kashan is divided into two parts, mountainous and desert.

=== Location ===
The city of Kashan is located in the north of Isfahan province, north of the Karkas Mountains and west of Dasht-e Kavir desert, where it is poor in terms of vegetation and where bushes and shrubs are more or less found.

=== Mountains ===
Dare mountain is next to Dare village and 14 kilometers southwest of Kashan with a height of 2,985 meters overlooking the city of Kashan, and Mount Gargash is the second highest peak of the Karkas mountain range (the first is mount Karakas in Natanz), 33 kilometers southwest of Kashan and 12 kilometers southwest of Qamsar and 7 kilometers northeast of Kamu with a height of 3,600 meters. Ardahal peak is located 35 kilometers west of Kashan with a height of 3505 meters after Gargash, is the highest point of Kashan heights (continuation of the central mountain range) in the vicinity of Niaser and the villages Nashlej and Mashhad.

After assessment of 40 summits in Iran for construction of a national observation facility regarding their surrounding light pollution, Mount Gargash was chosen as the site of Iranian National Observatory in 2003. After 18 years, the facility was inaugurated in 2021.

=== Climate ===
Kashan has a hot desert climate, with (BWh) designation in Köppen climate classification and (BW) in Trewartha climate classification, with cold winters (although warmer than other Iranian cities) and very hot and dry summers. Kashan is significantly warmer than other cities in the Iranian Plateau due to its lower elevation.

Climate data for Kashan (1991–2020, records 1966–present)
Month	Jan	Feb	Mar	Apr	May	Jun	Jul	Aug	Sep	Oct	Nov	Dec	Year
Record high °C (°F)	22.0 (71.6)	27.0 (80.6)	36.4 (97.5)	37.3 (99.1)	42.4 (108.3)	48.0 (118.4)	48.0 (118.4)	47.1 (116.8)	43.0 (109.4)	39.0 (102.2)	32.2 (90.0)	24.5 (76.1)	48.0 (118.4)
Mean daily maximum °C (°F)	10.7 (51.3)	14.2 (57.6)	19.9 (67.8)	26.0 (78.8)	32.1 (89.8)	38.1 (100.6)	40.8 (105.4)	39.7 (103.5)	35.1 (95.2)	27.5 (81.5)	18.0 (64.4)	12.2 (54.0)	26.2 (79.2)
Daily mean °C (°F)	4.9 (40.8)	8.0 (46.4)	13.4 (56.1)	19.3 (66.7)	25.1 (77.2)	31.0 (87.8)	33.7 (92.7)	32.2 (90.0)	27.3 (81.1)	20.1 (68.2)	11.8 (53.2)	6.4 (43.5)	19.4 (67.0)
Mean daily minimum °C (°F)	−0.2 (31.6)	2.1 (35.8)	6.9 (44.4)	12.3 (54.1)	17.4 (63.3)	22.4 (72.3)	25.4 (77.7)	23.6 (74.5)	18.9 (66.0)	13.0 (55.4)	6.1 (43.0)	1.4 (34.5)	12.4 (54.4)
Record low °C (°F)	−17.4 (0.7)	−10.0 (14.0)	−4.5 (23.9)	0.0 (32.0)	5.4 (41.7)	10.6 (51.1)	15.2 (59.4)	12.4 (54.3)	10.0 (50.0)	4.5 (40.1)	−8.6 (16.5)	−8.0 (17.6)	−17.4 (0.7)
Average precipitation mm (inches)	20.6 (0.81)	15.1 (0.59)	26.3 (1.04)	21.6 (0.85)	14.0 (0.55)	1.5 (0.06)	0.4 (0.02)	0.5 (0.02)	0.3 (0.01)	4.7 (0.19)	14.6 (0.57)	14.7 (0.58)	134.3 (5.29)
Average snowfall cm (inches)	12.2 (4.8)	3.5 (1.4)	1.0 (0.4)	0.0 (0.0)	0.0 (0.0)	0.0 (0.0)	0.0 (0.0)	0.0 (0.0)	0.0 (0.0)	0.0 (0.0)	0.1 (0.0)	1.4 (0.6)	18.2 (7.2)
Average precipitation days (≥ 1.0 mm)	4.1	2.8	3.8	3.5	2.1	0.5	0.2	0.1	0.2	1.2	2.7	3.1	24.3
Average snowy days	2.7	1.2	0.5	0.0	0.0	0.0	0.0	0.0	0.0	0.0	0.1	1.0	5.5
Average relative humidity (%)	61	52	43	40	33	22	21	22	25	37	53	62	39
Average dew point °C (°F)	−2.8 (27.0)	−2.5 (27.5)	−0.6 (30.9)	3.4 (38.1)	5.8 (42.4)	5.6 (42.1)	7.0 (44.6)	6.3 (43.3)	4.6 (40.3)	3.6 (38.5)	1.2 (34.2)	−1.0 (30.2)	2.6 (36.6)
Mean monthly sunshine hours	187	194	222	234	282	329	332	341	306	264	192	176	3,059
Source 1: NCEI (snowfall 1981–2010)
Source 2: IRIMO (snow days and extremes 1966–2010), Ogimet

== Main sights ==
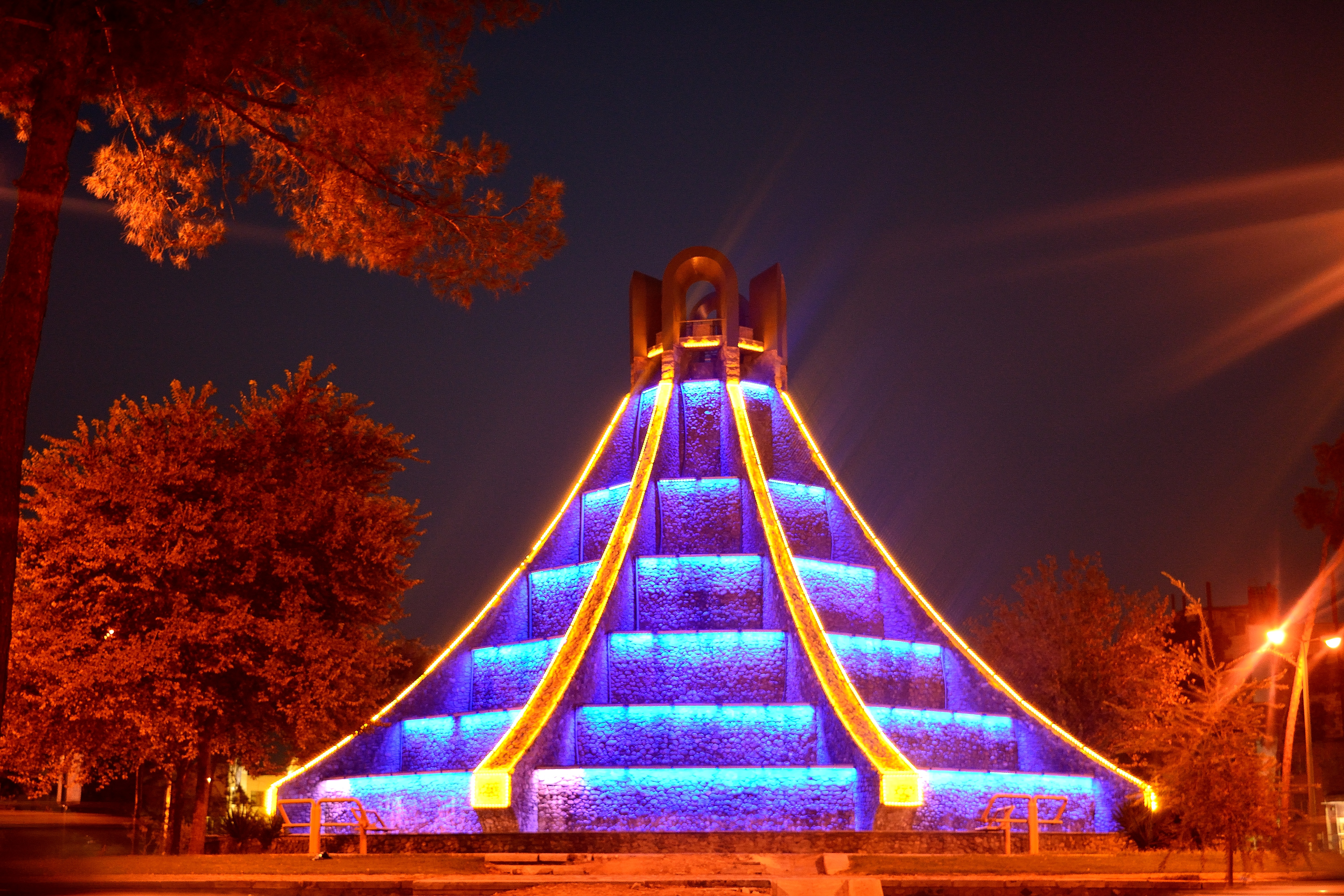
Kashan Former Entrance

On 9 August 2007, Iran placed the Historical Axis of Fin, Sialk, Kashan on its Tentative List for possible future nomination as a UNESCO World Heritage Site. The exact definition of what locations within Kashan proper might be nominated was not made clear. In 2012, Iran successfully nominated the Fin Garden separately for inscription by UNESCO as a part of its Persian gardens World Heritage Site. Despite this the "Historical-Cultural Axis of Fin, Sialk, Kashan" remains in full on Iran's Tentative List. The Borujerdi House is one of the historical places from the Qajar era.

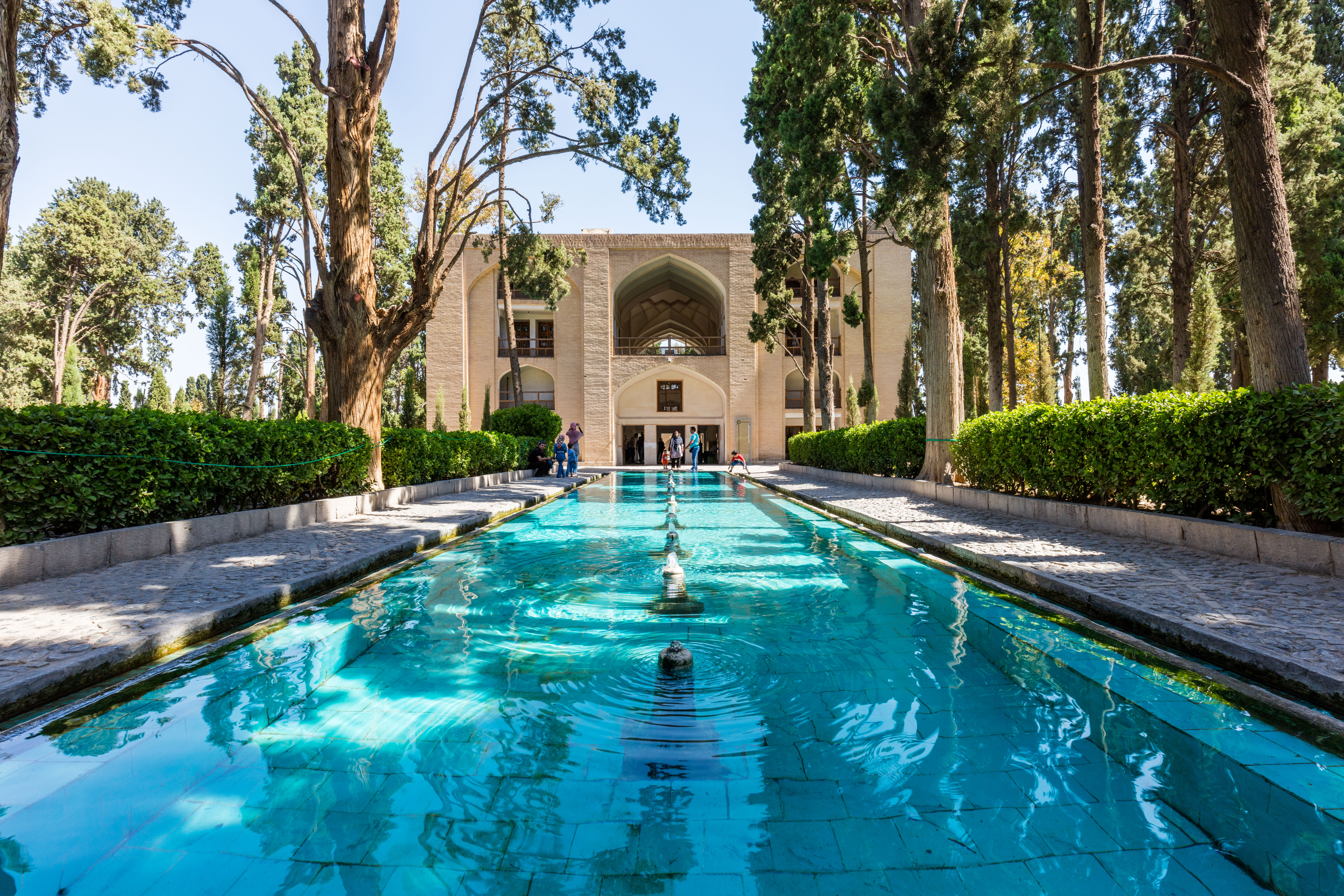
Fin Garden

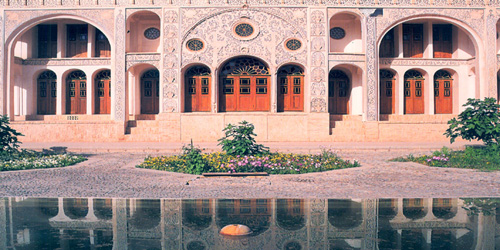
Tabatabai House, early 1800s, Kashan. A fine example of traditional Iranian architecture.

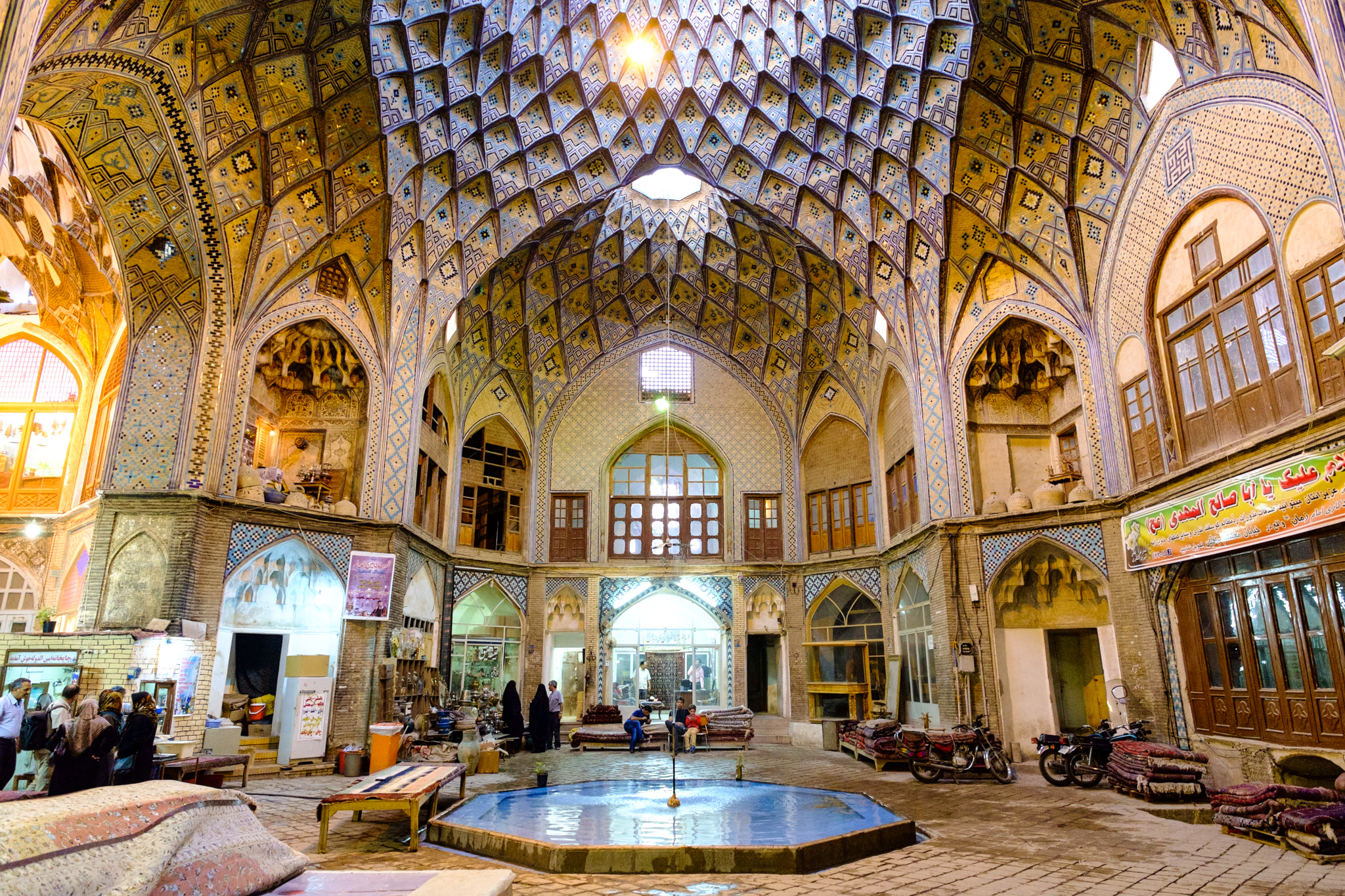
Amin od-Dowleh Caravansarai

Kashan's architectural sights include:

- Abbāsi House
- Agha Bozorg Mosque
- Āmeri House
- Bazaar of Kashan
- Borujerdi House
- Fin Garden
- Jalali Castle
- Jameh Mosque of Kashan
- Meydan Mosque
- Shrine of Abu Lu'lu'a (shrine dedicated to the assassin of Umar, the second Islamic caliph)
- Sultan Amir Ahmad Bathhouse
- Tabatabai House
- Tabriziha Mosque
- Tepe Sialk

== Today ==
Kashan is known for the manufacture of carpets, silk and other textiles.

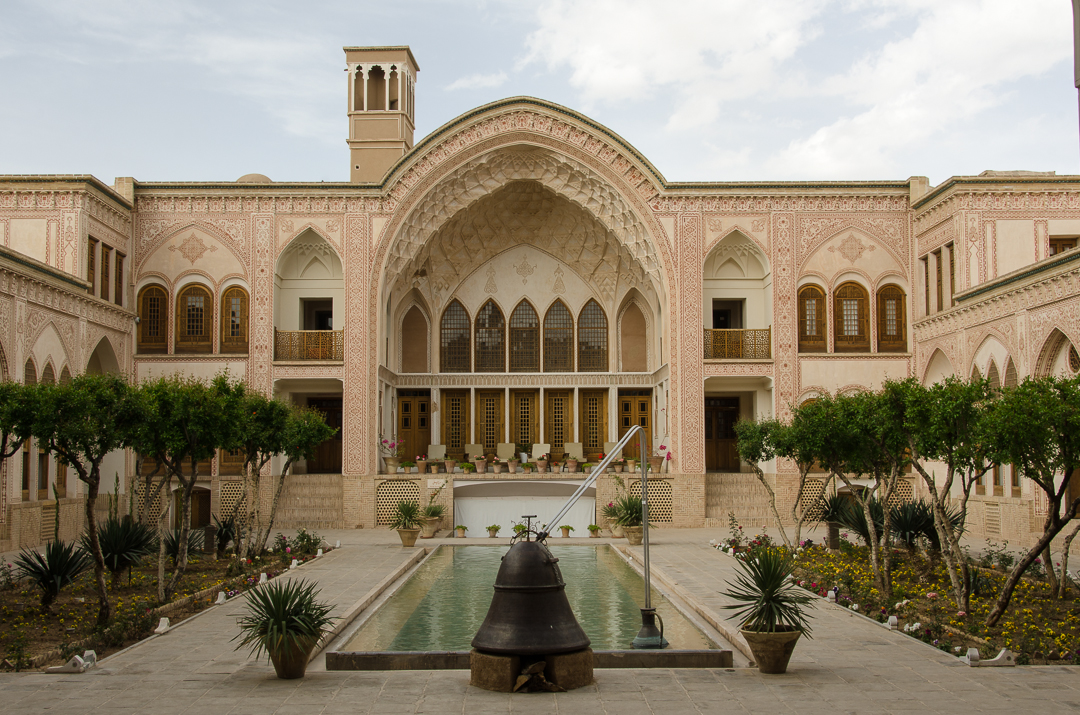
Ameri House

== Education ==
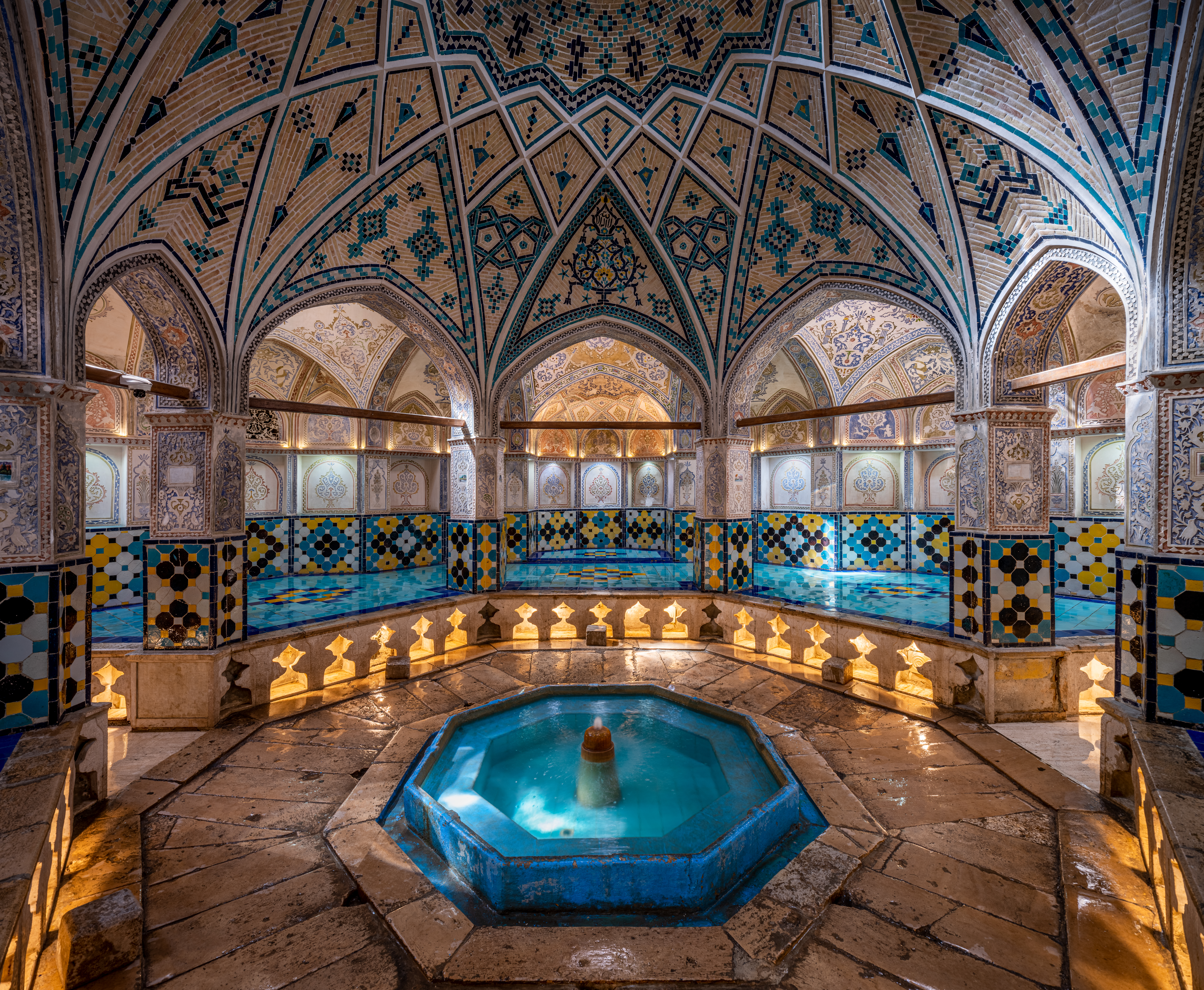
Sultan Amir Ahmad Bathhouse

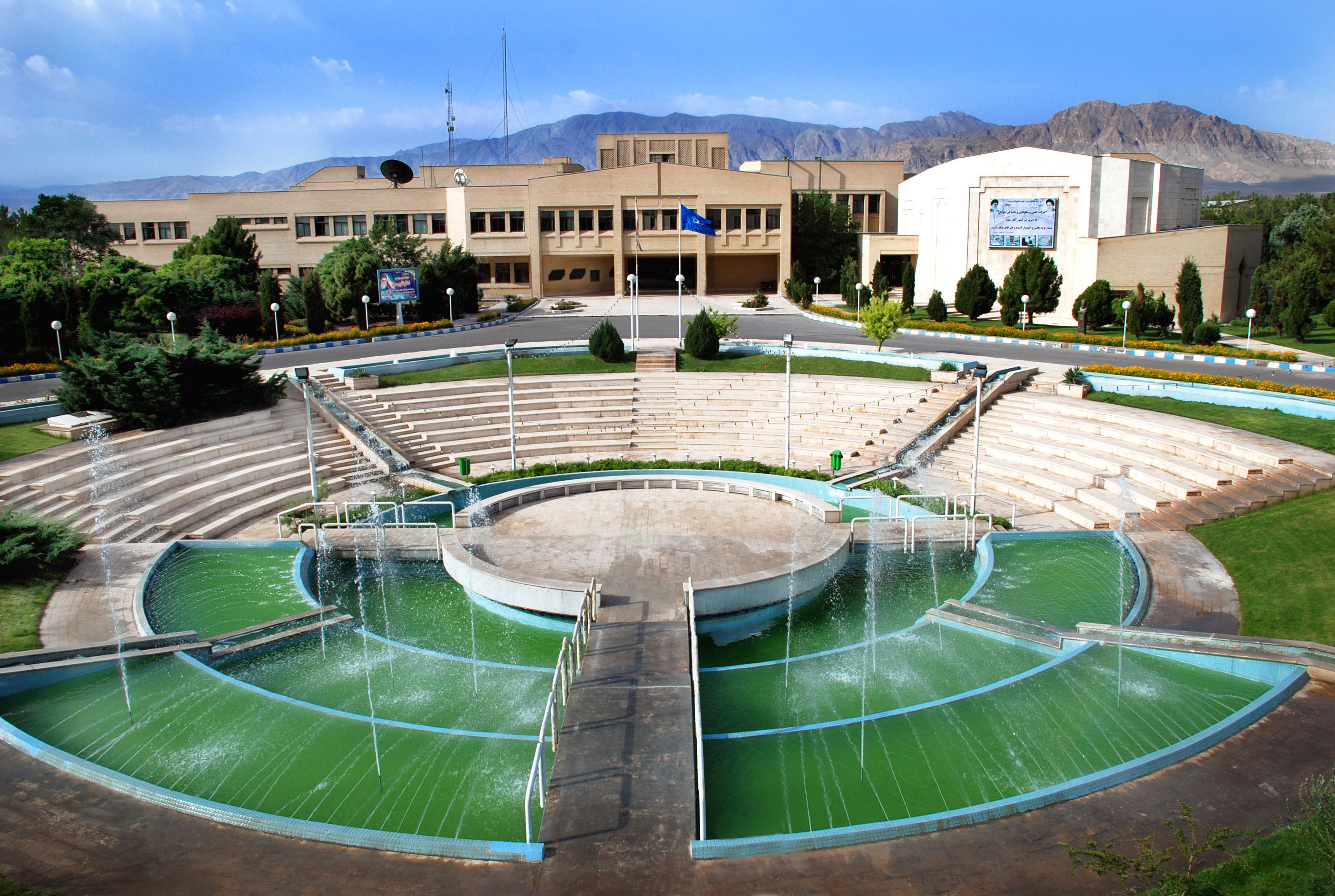
University of Kashan Entrance

There are more than 10,000 students currently studying in various fields (e.g.:Applied sciences, Engineering, Art, Law, Medical sciences, Nano technology, literature, Carpet and Handicrafts, etc.) at universities of Kashan. Colleges and universities in Kashan include:

- Kashan University of Medical Sciences
- Islamic Azad University of Kashan
- University of Kashan

== Accessibility ==
- Road 71
- Freeway 7, located near the city

Kashan is connected via freeways to Isfahan and Natanz to the South, and Qom, which is an hour drive away to the north. Kashan railway station is along the main north–south railways of Iran. Kashan Airport reopened on 2 June 2016 after twenty years hiatus with an ATA Airlines flight from Mashhad International Airport.

== Notable people ==
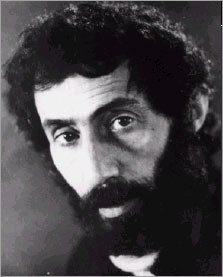
Sohrab Sepehri contemporary painter and poet

- Reza Abbasi, Persian miniaturist
- David Alliance, Baron Alliance, businessman, politician, and member of the House of Lords
- Amir Ghafour, volleyball player
- Saeed Hajjarian, reformist political strategist, journalist, pro-democracy activist and former intelligence officer.
- Ehsan Hajsafi, professional footballer
- Ghyath ad-Din Jamshid Kashani
- Mohsen Feyz Kashani, Akhbari Twelver Shi'i Muslim, mystic, poet, philosopher, and muhaddith
- Afdal al-Din Kashani, poet and philosopher
- Kalim Kashani, poet
- Molla Fathollah Kashani, jurisprudent, theologian, and commentator
- Muhtasham Kashani, poet
- Javad Kazemian, football winger
- Isaac Larian (born 1954), Iranian-born American businessman, founder and the chief executive officer of MGA Entertainment, the world's largest privately owned toy company
- Ustad Ali Maryam, architect
- Kamal-ol-Molk, painter
- Sani ol molk, painter, artist, and illustrator
- Mohammad Motamedi, traditional vocalist, and a ney player
- Mulla Muhammad Mahdi Naraqi
- Ghotb Ravandi
- Sohrab Sepehri, poet and painter
- Yedidia Shofet (1908 –2005), Chief Rabbi of Iran
- Pari Zangeneh, folk singer and actor
- Moluk Zarabi, singer and actor

== Twin towns – sister cities ==
- Neishabour, Iran

== Gallery ==
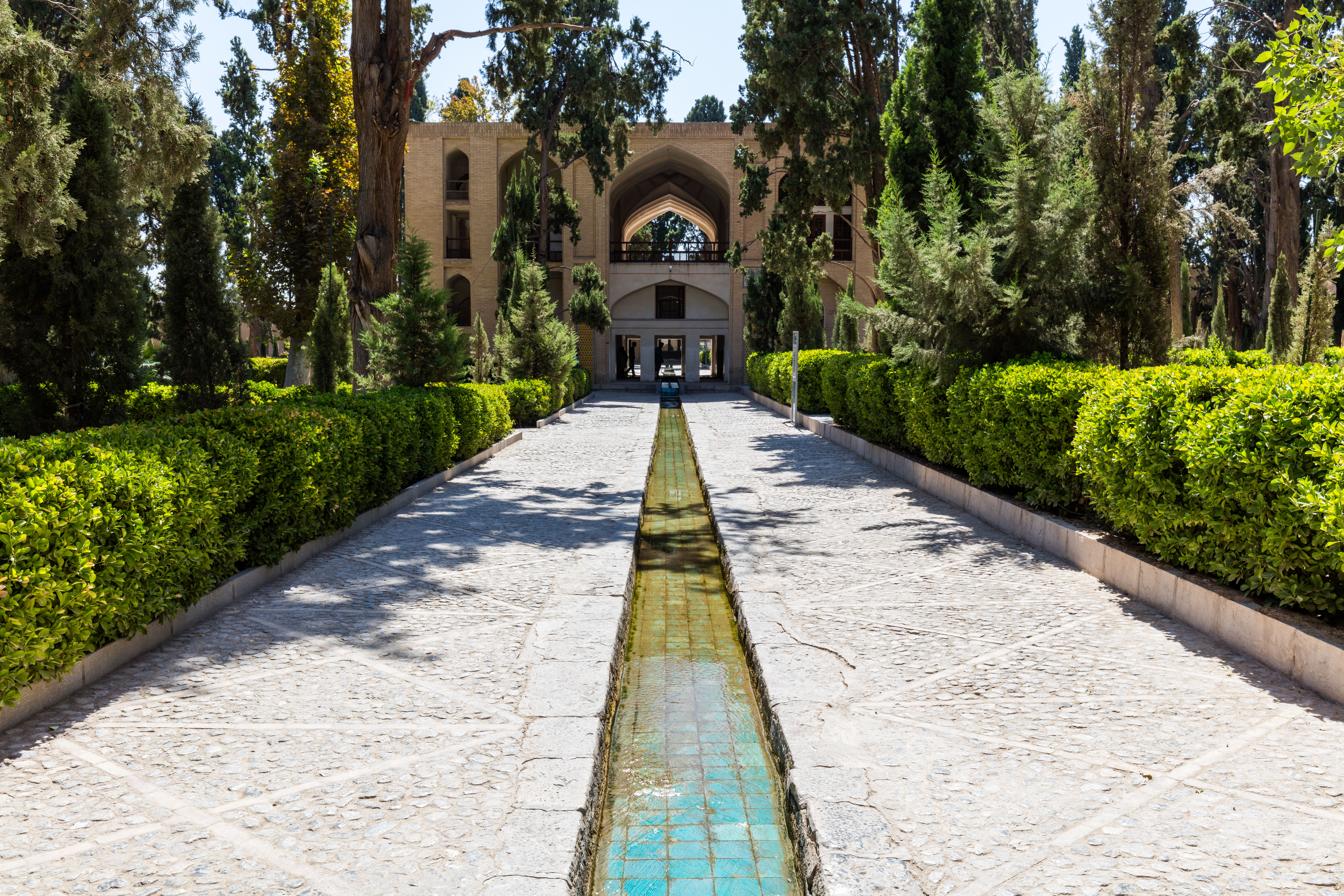
Fin Garden

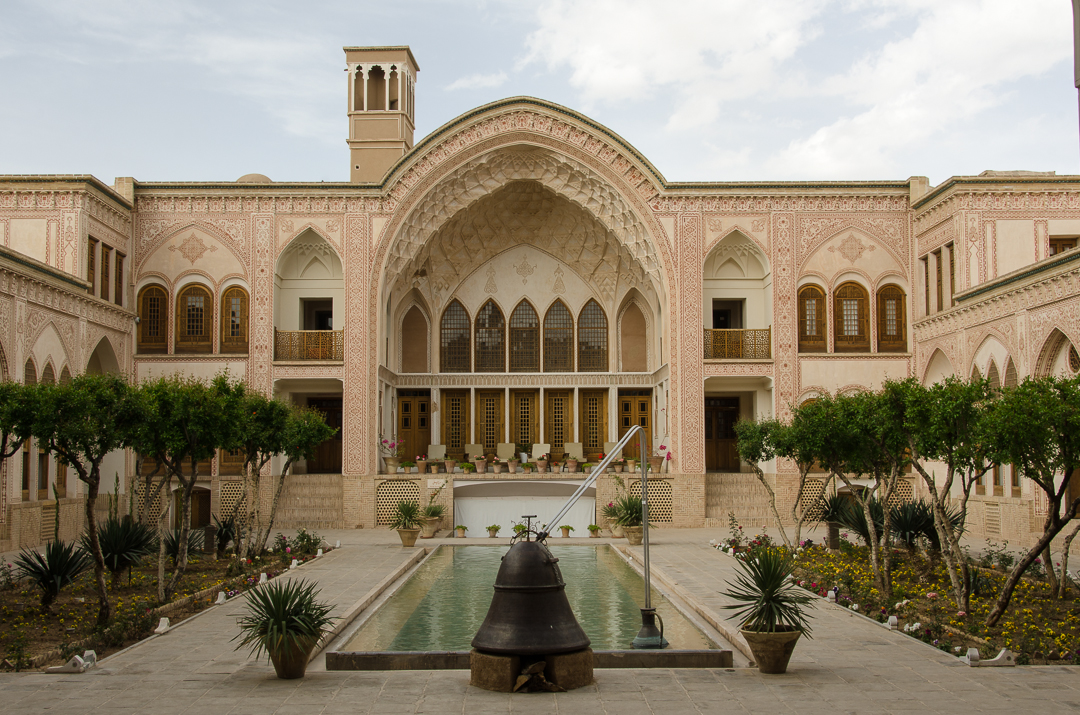
Ameri House

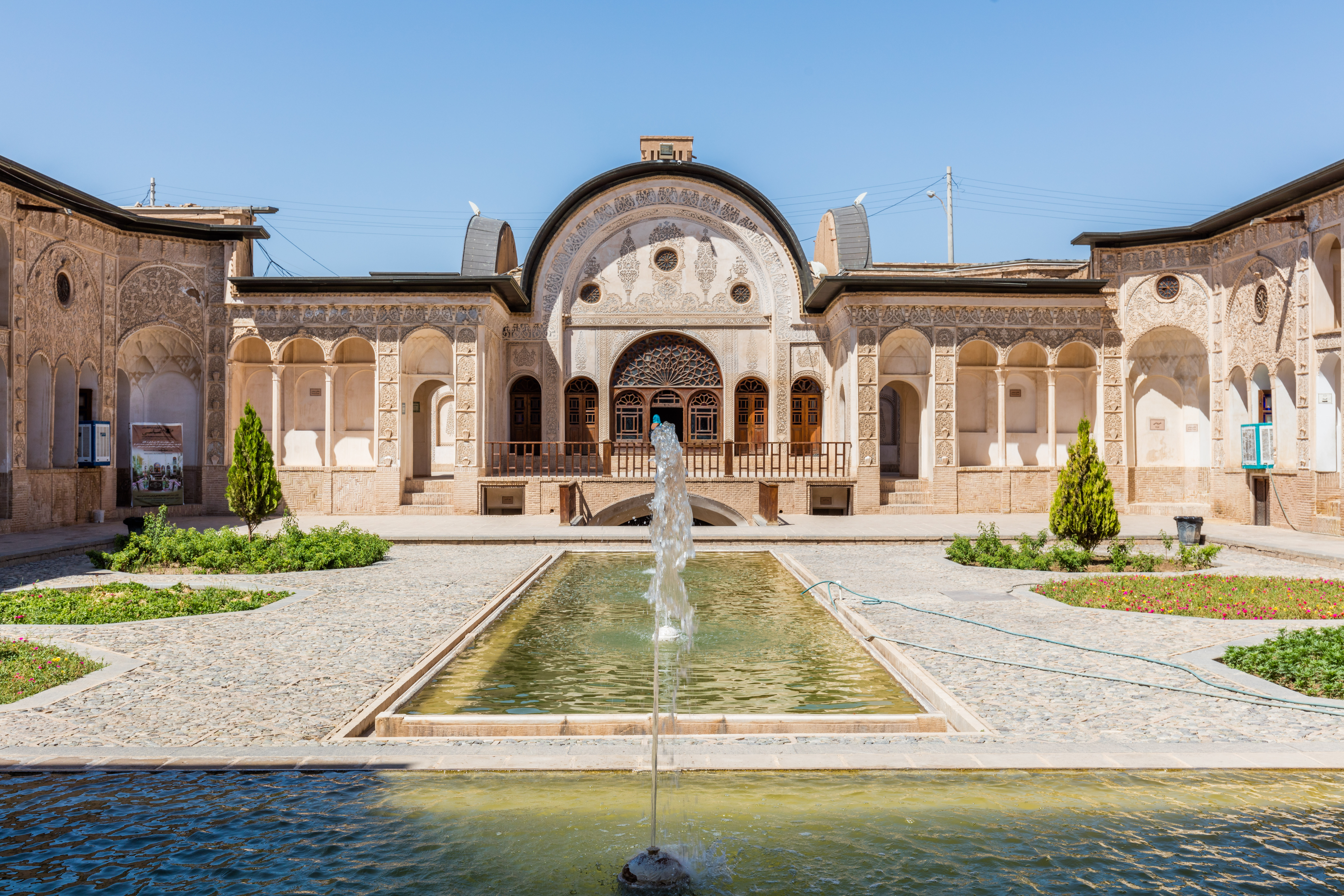
Tabatabai House

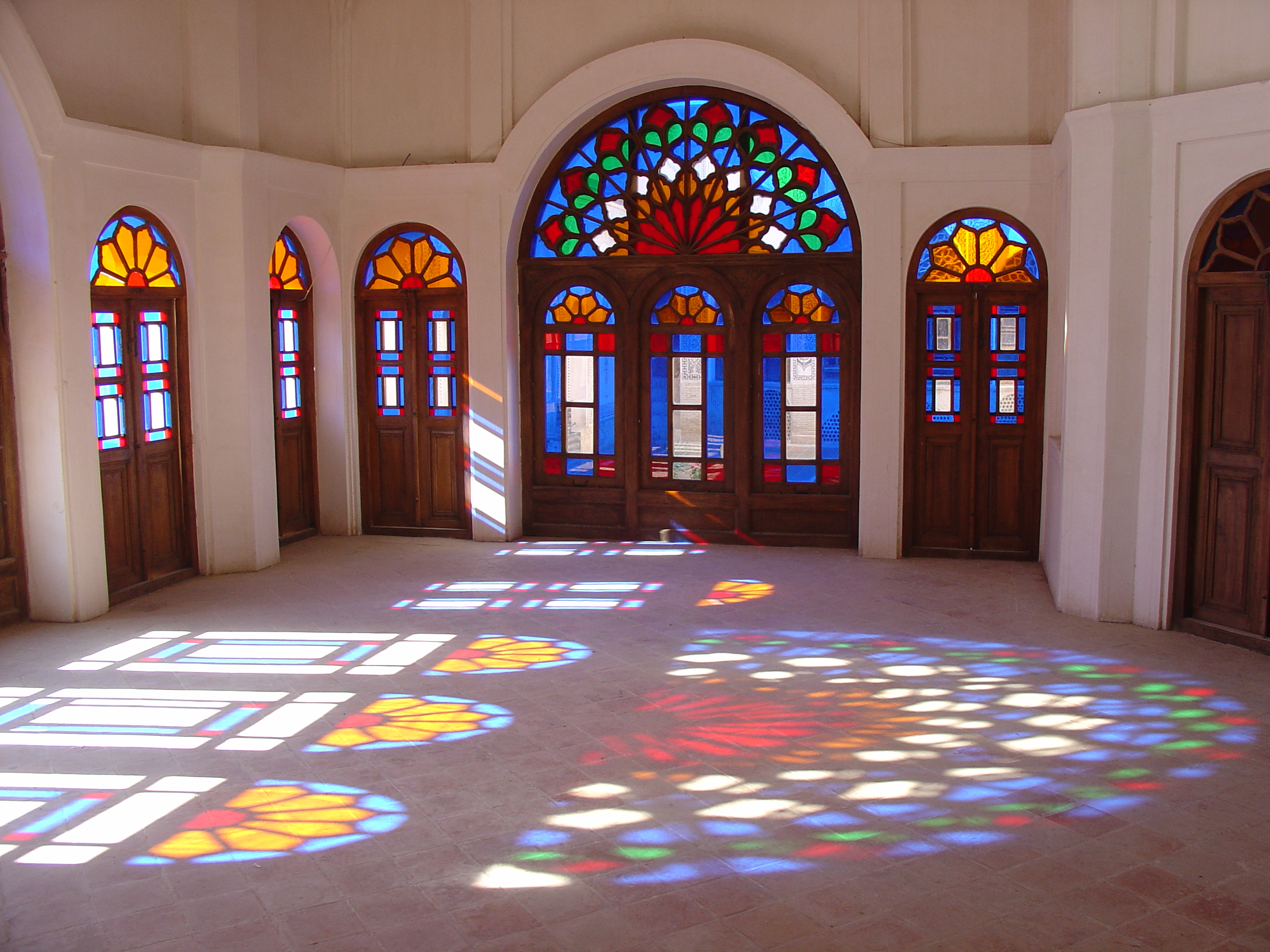
Interior of Tabatabai House

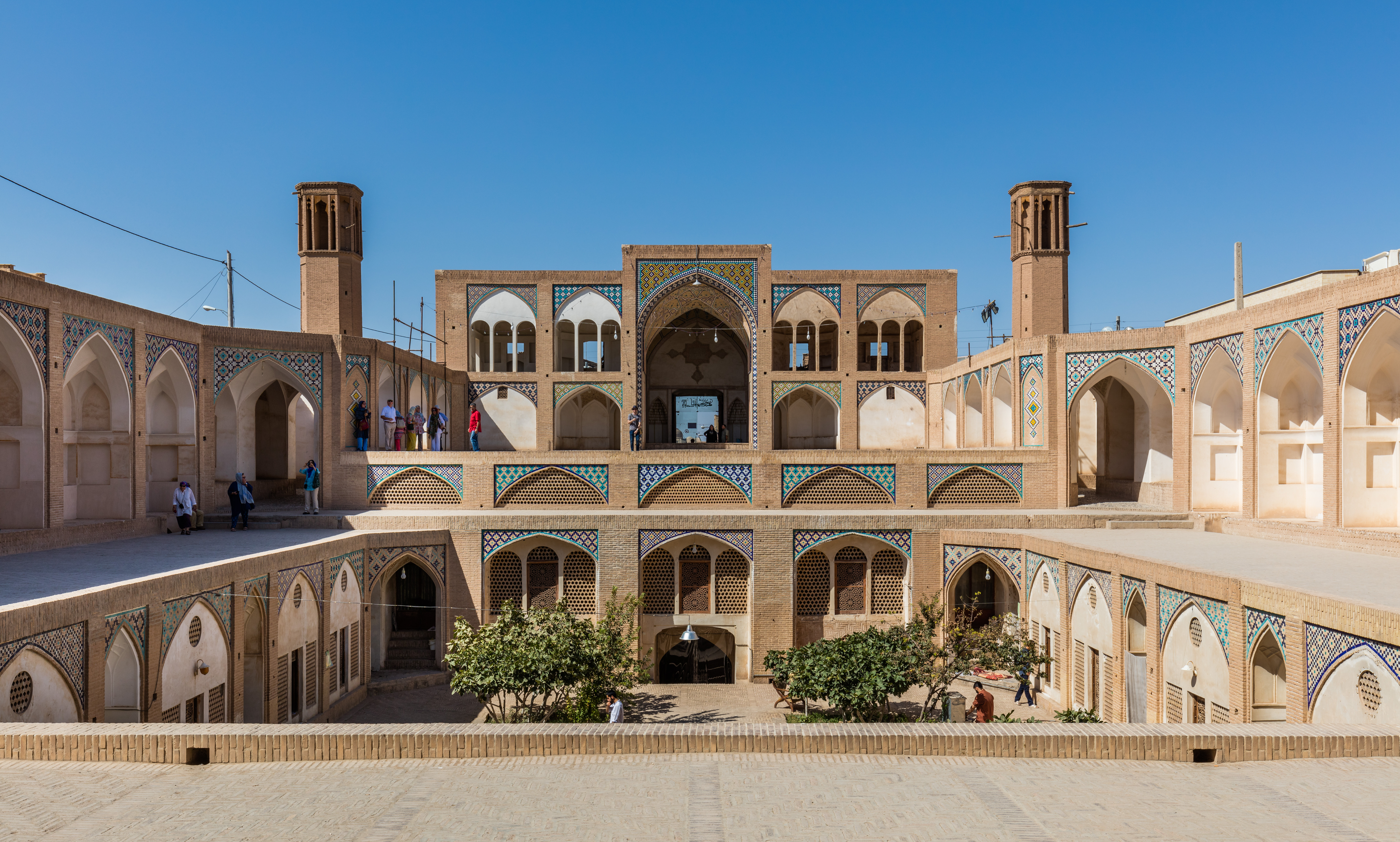
Agha Bozorg School and Mosque

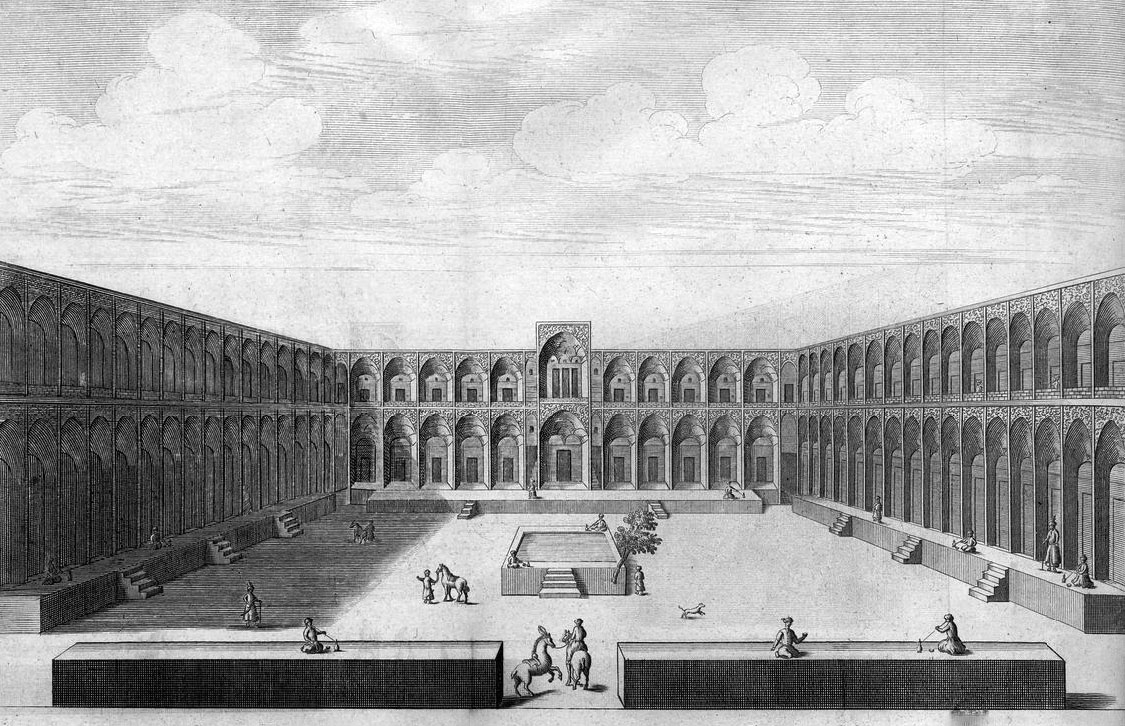
Chardin Caravanseray

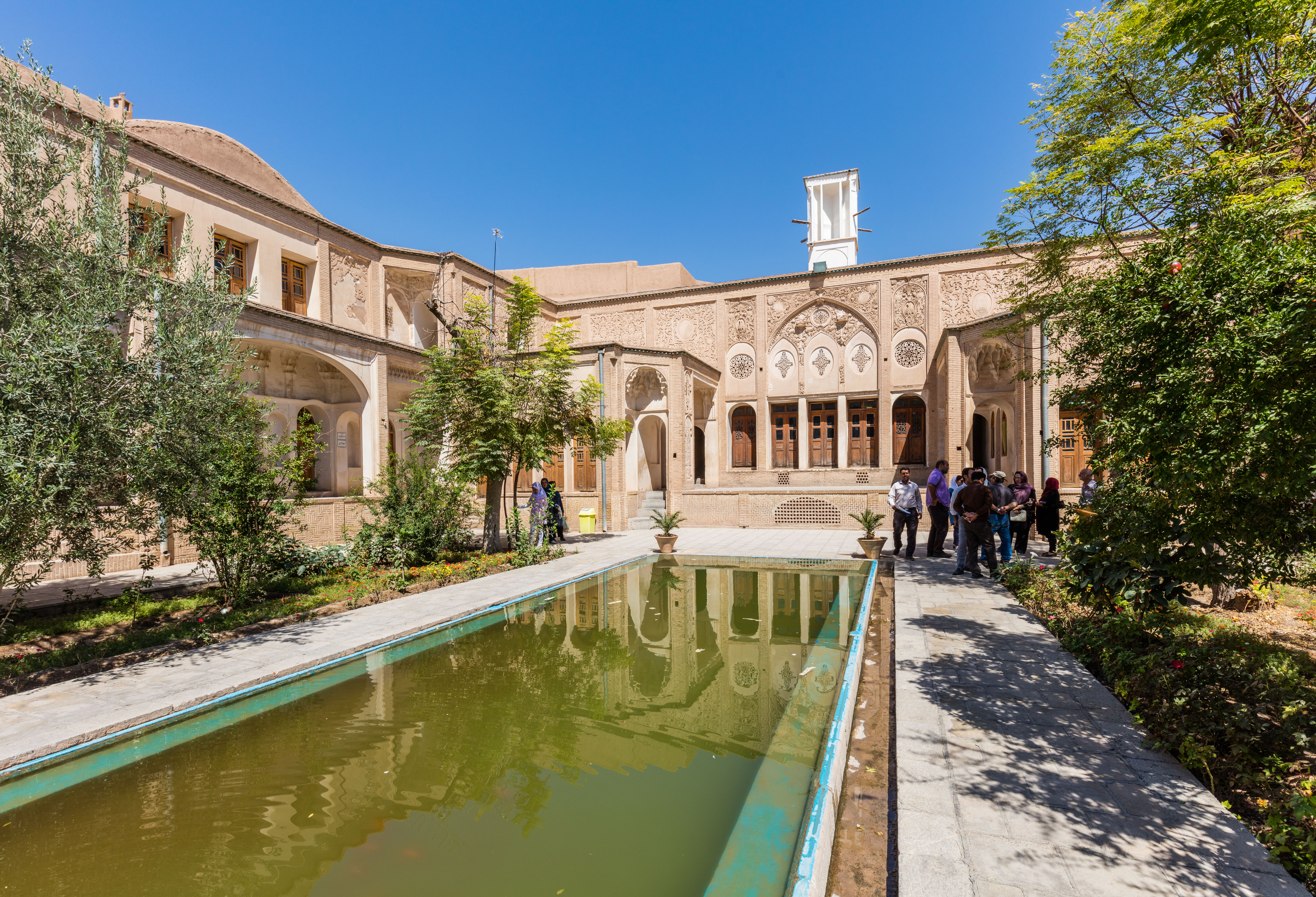
Borujerdi House

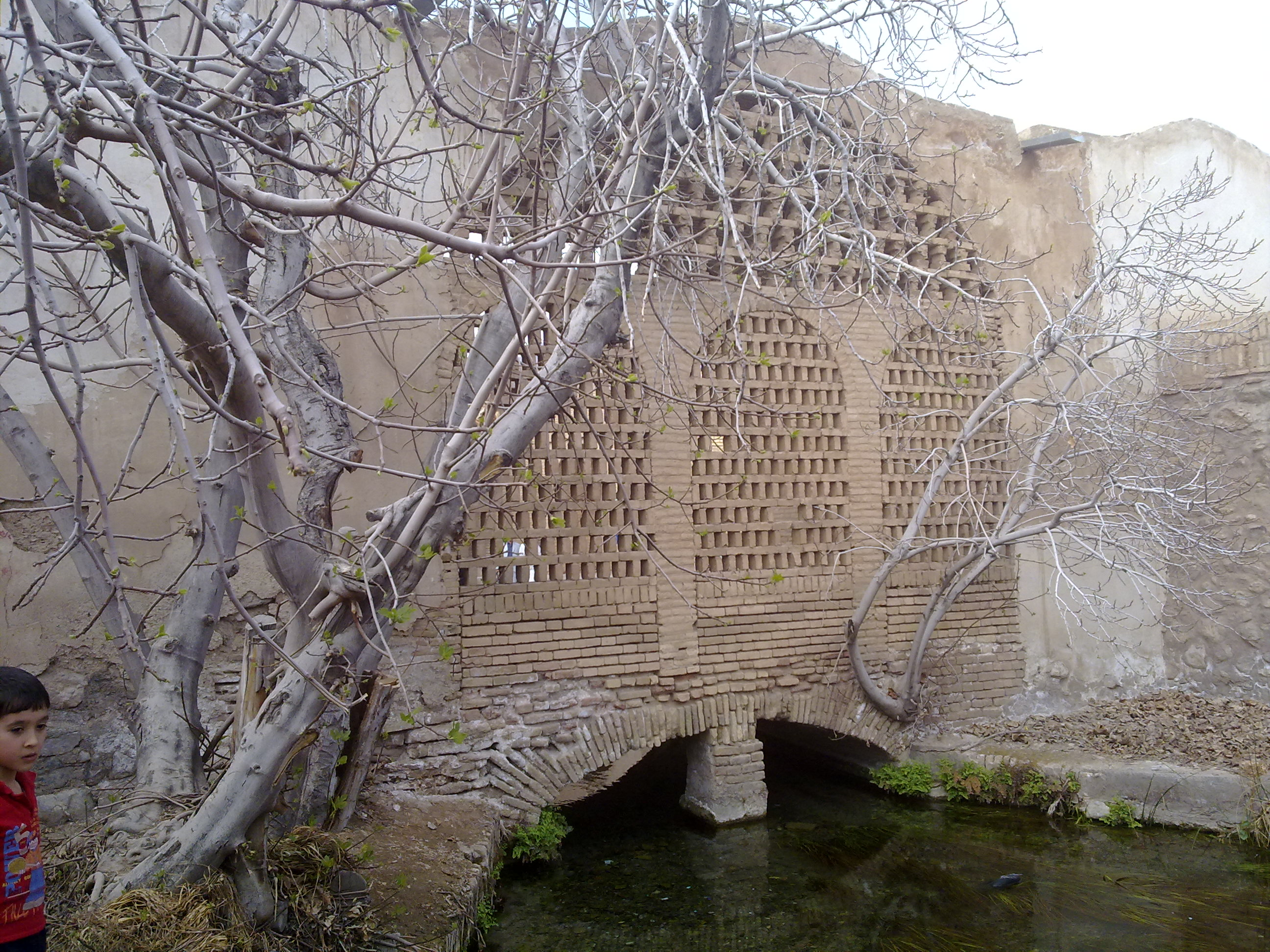
Soleimaniyeh spring

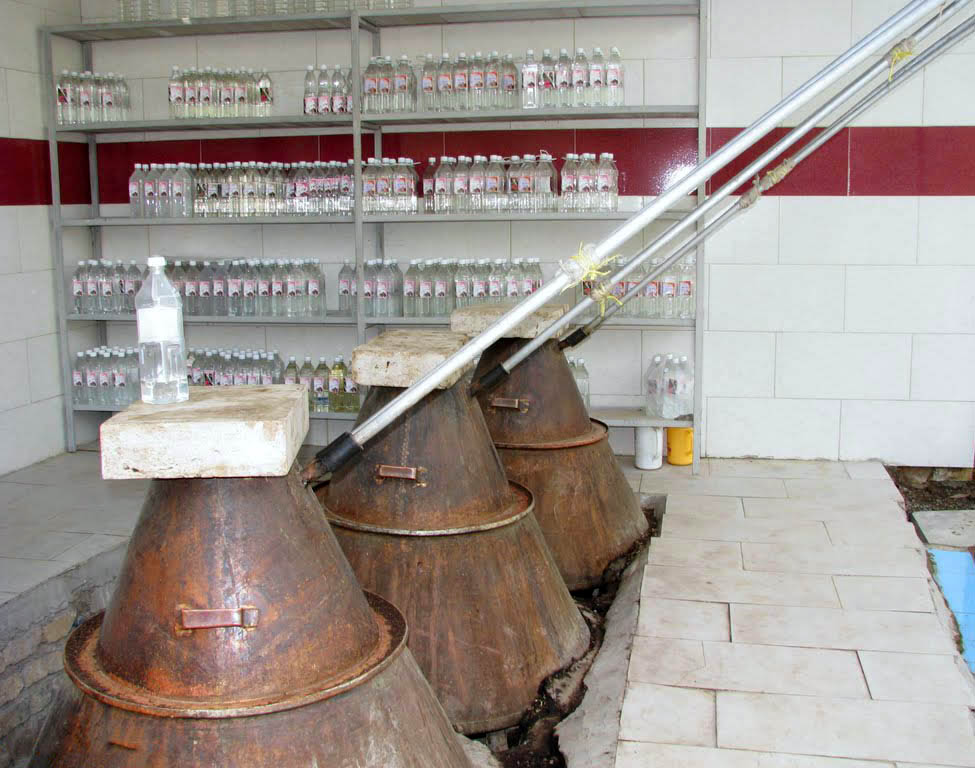
A manufactory of rose water in Kashan

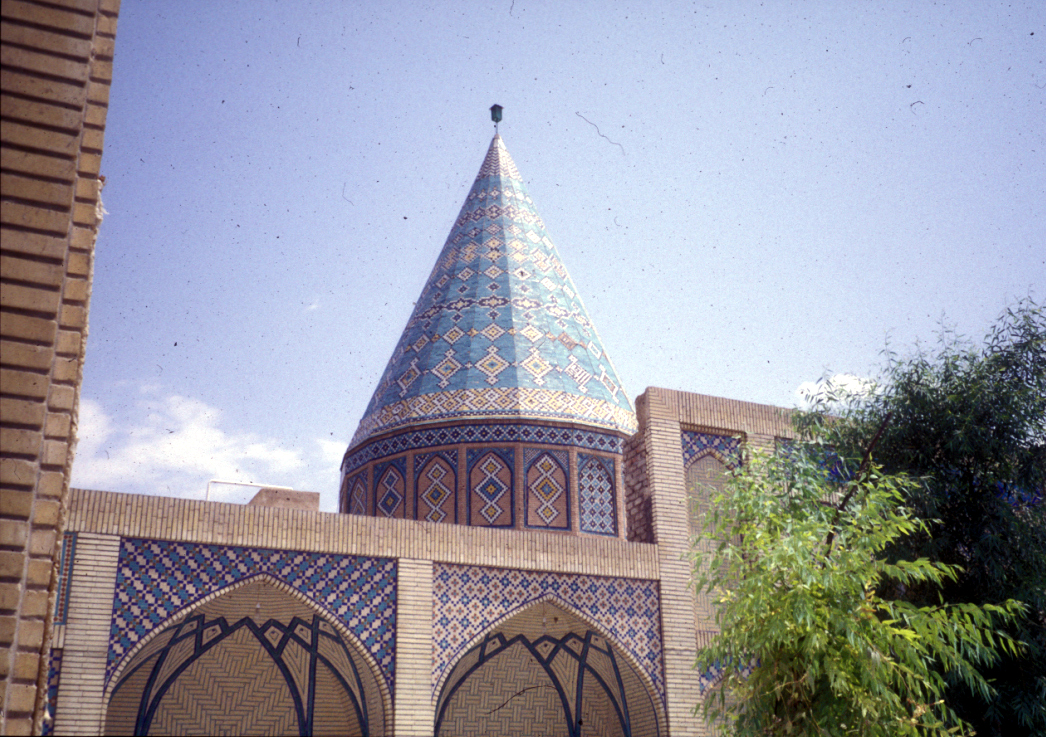
Shrine of Abu Lu'lu'a, not far from Fin Garden

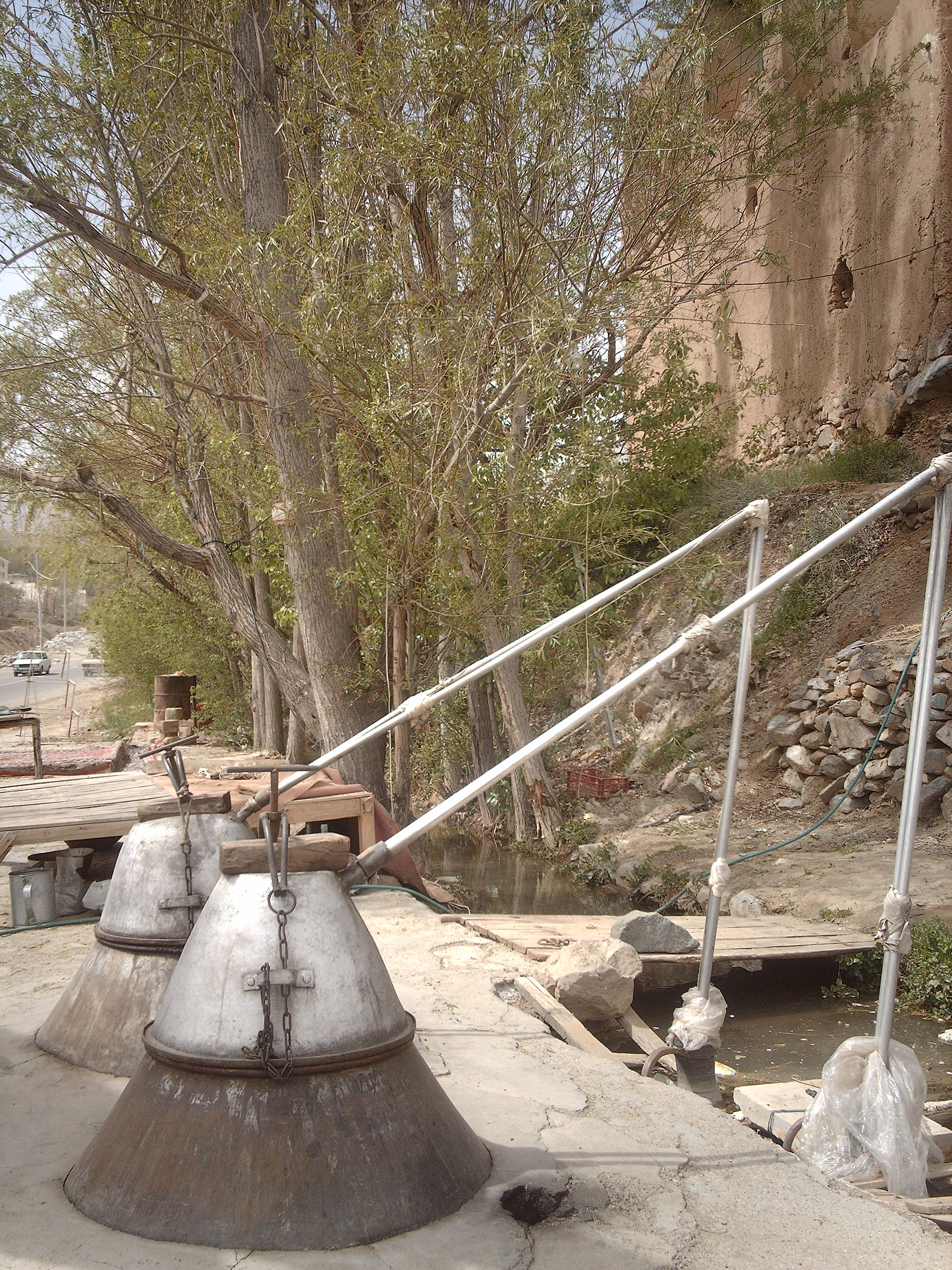
Golabgiri festival in Ghamsar

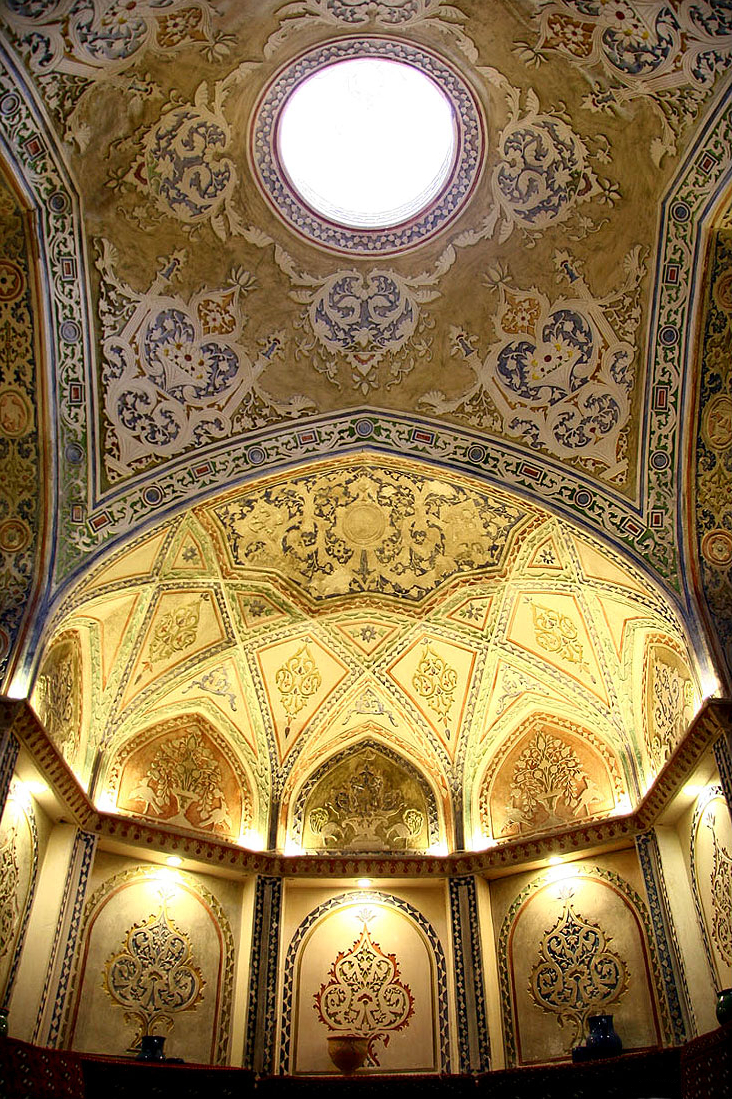
Interior of Soltan Amir Ahmad Bathhouse

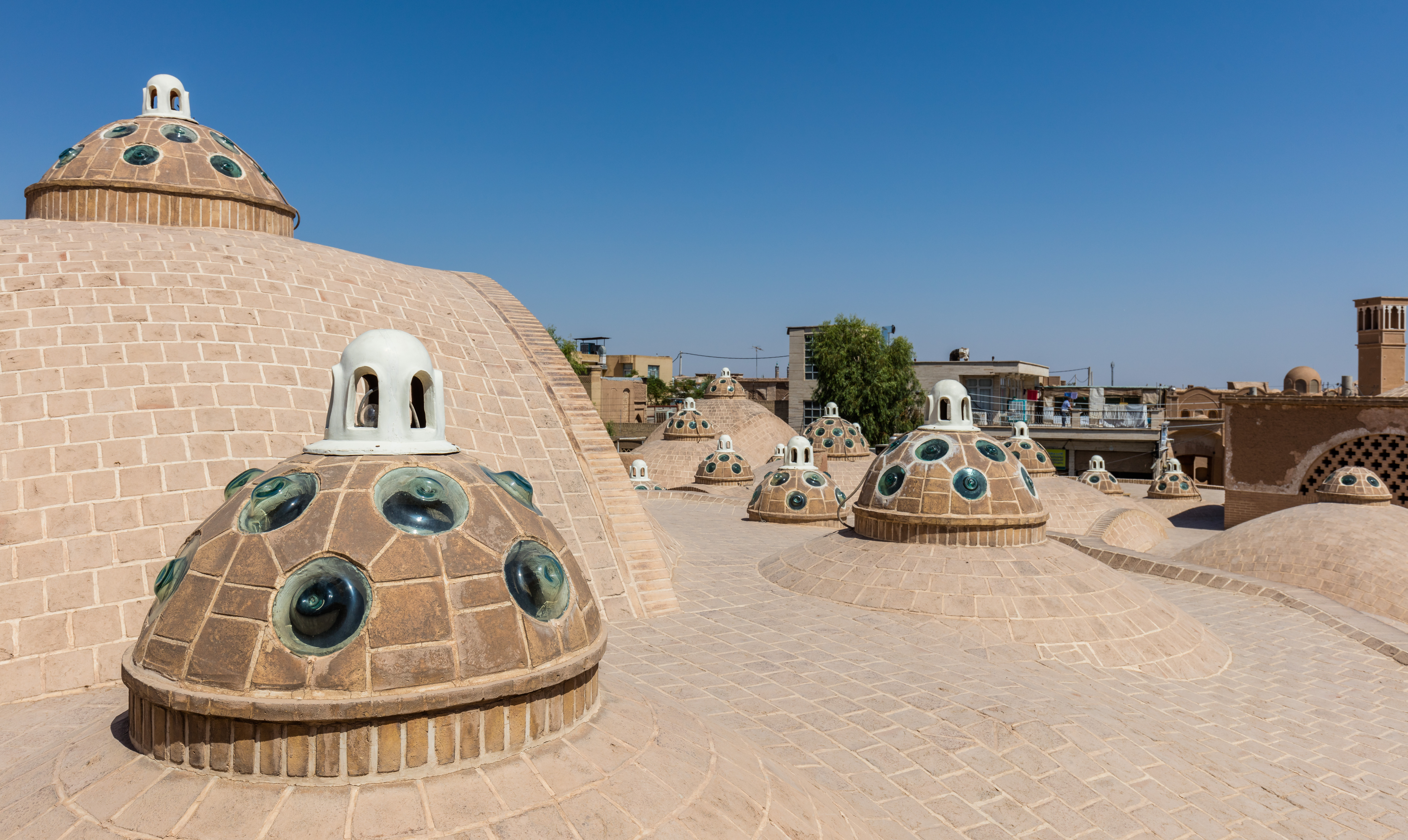
Roof of Soltan bath house

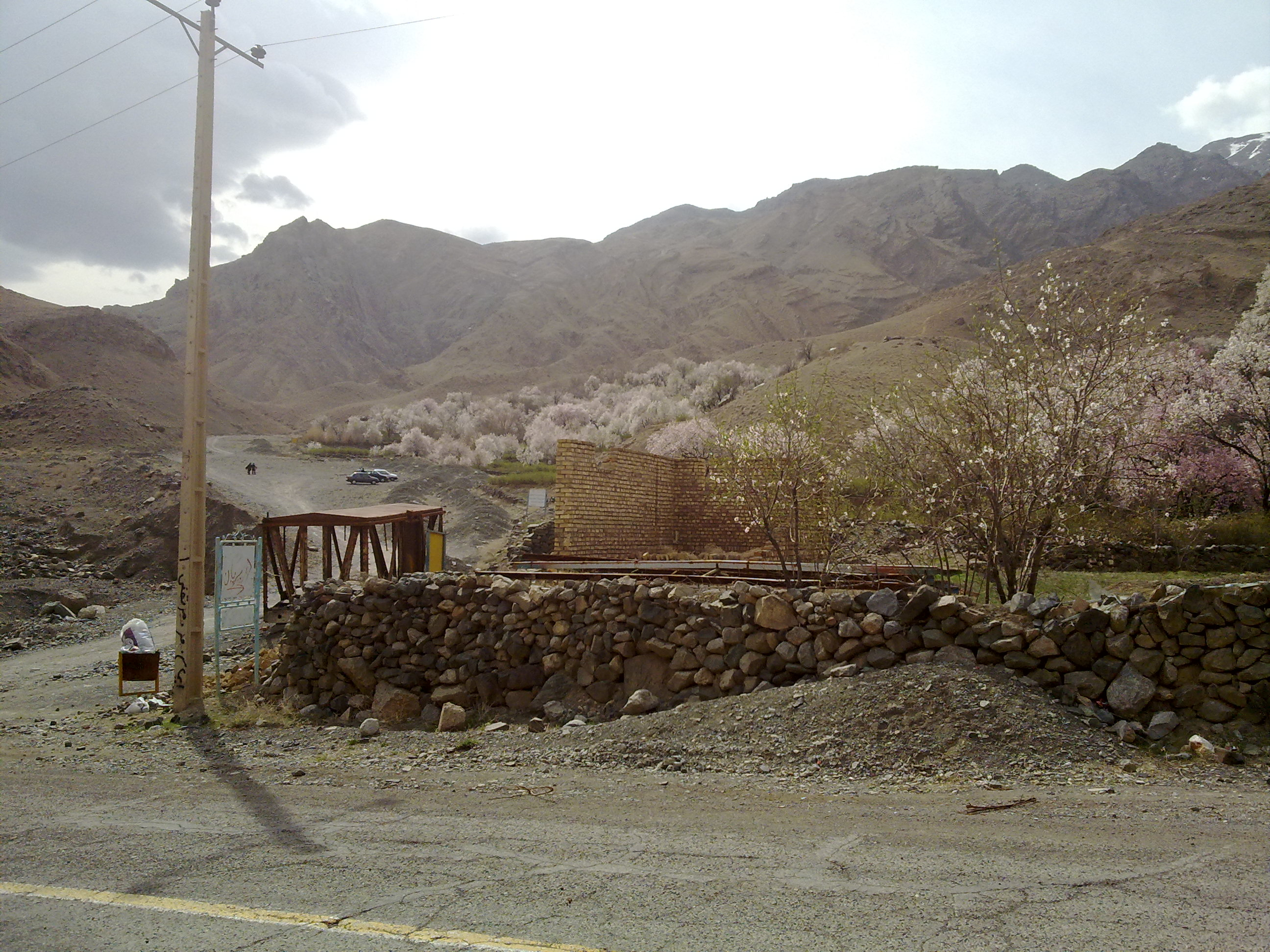
Darre Pariyan (Angels Valley)

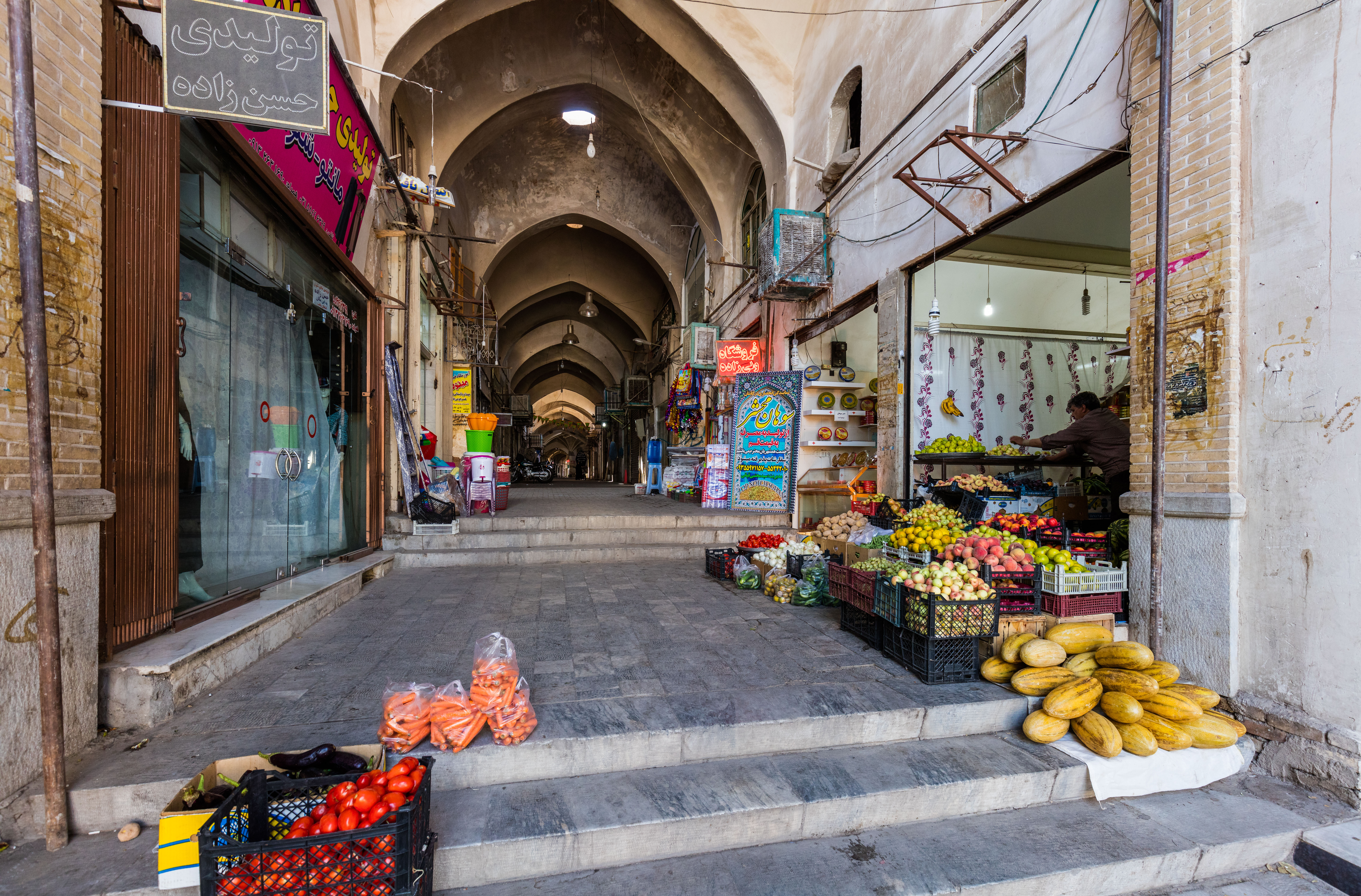
Bazaar of Kashan

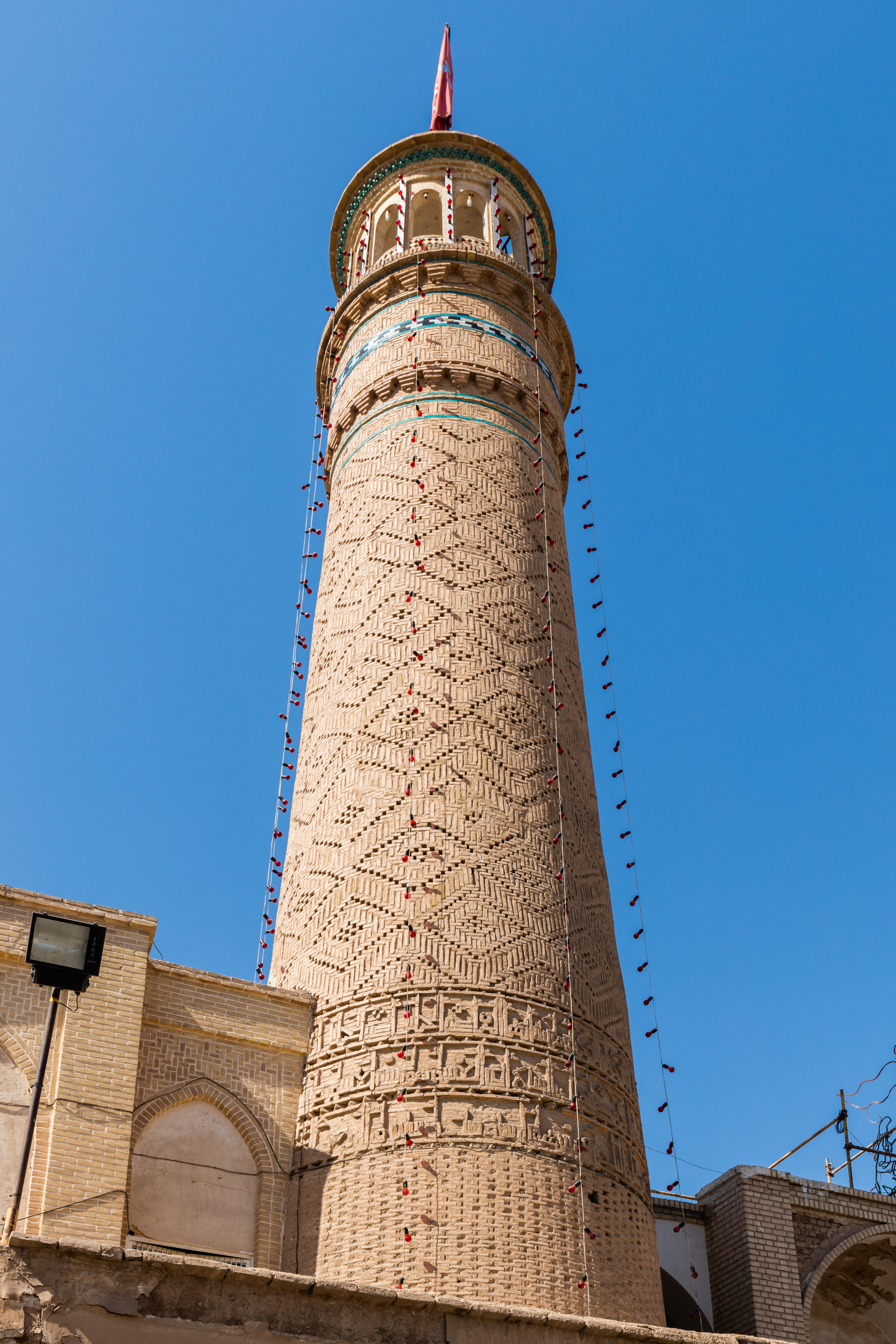
Friday Mosque of Kashan

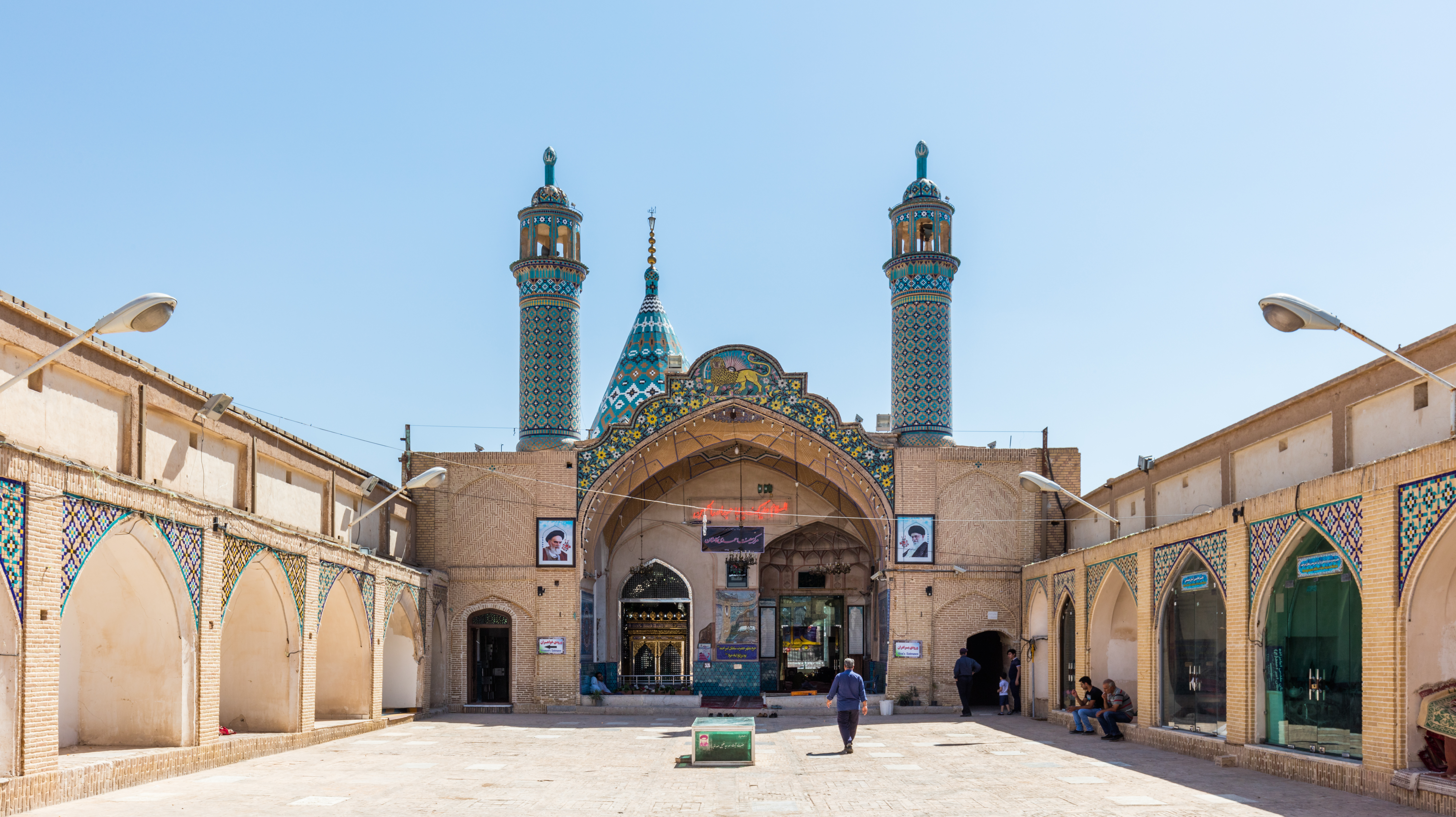
Sultan Amir Ahmad Mosque

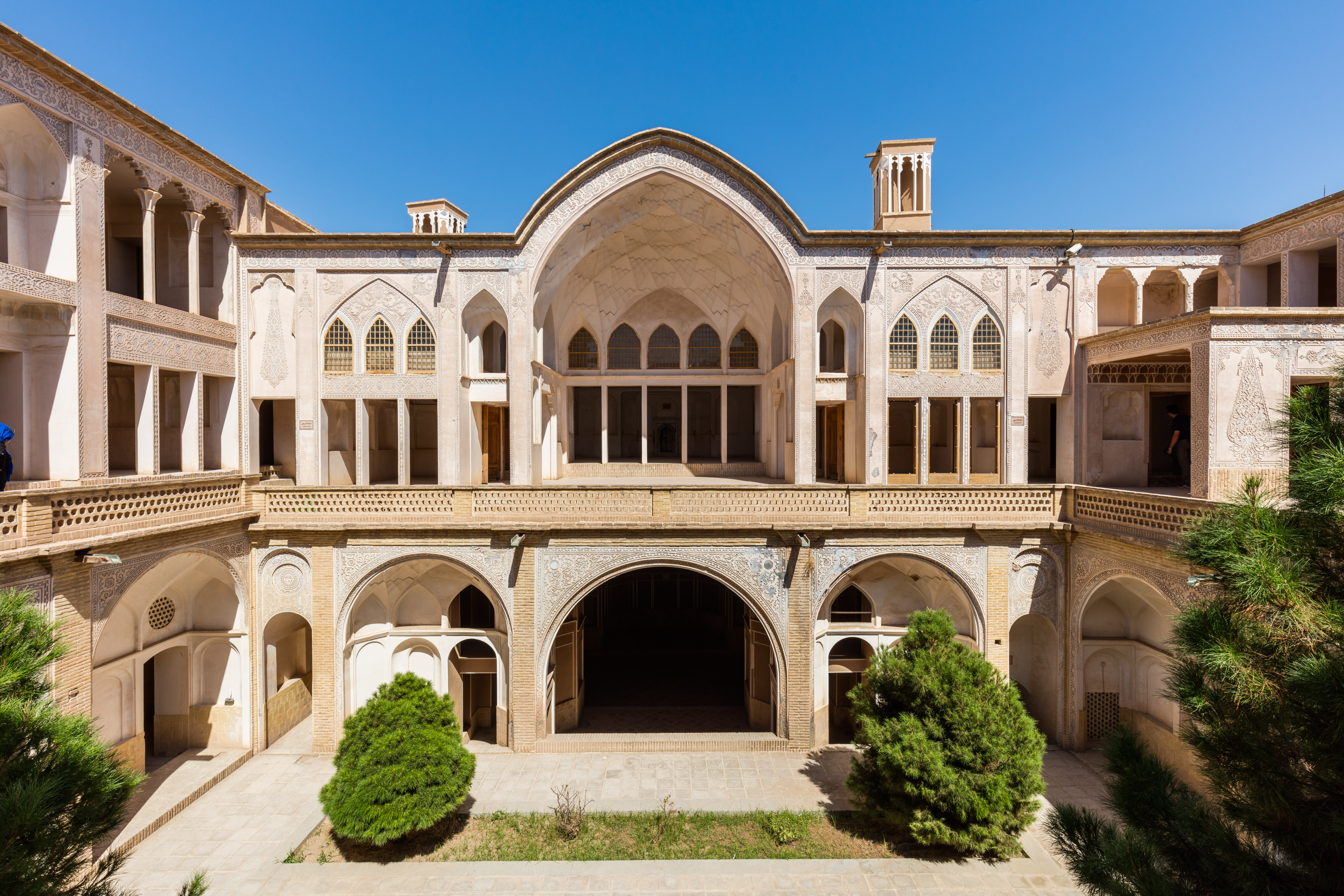
Abbasi House

== See also ==
- Aran va Bidgol
- Iranian Architecture
- Kashan rug
- List of the historical structures in the Isfahan province
- Maranjab Desert
- Namak lake
- Sialk - Kashan's ancient architecture.
- Traditional Persian residential architecture

Media related to Kashan at Wikimedia Commons

Kashan travel guide from Wikivoyage
