= Sultan Amir Ahmad Bathhouse =

Historic bathhouse in Kashan, Iran

Coordinates: 33.975203°N 51.441062°E

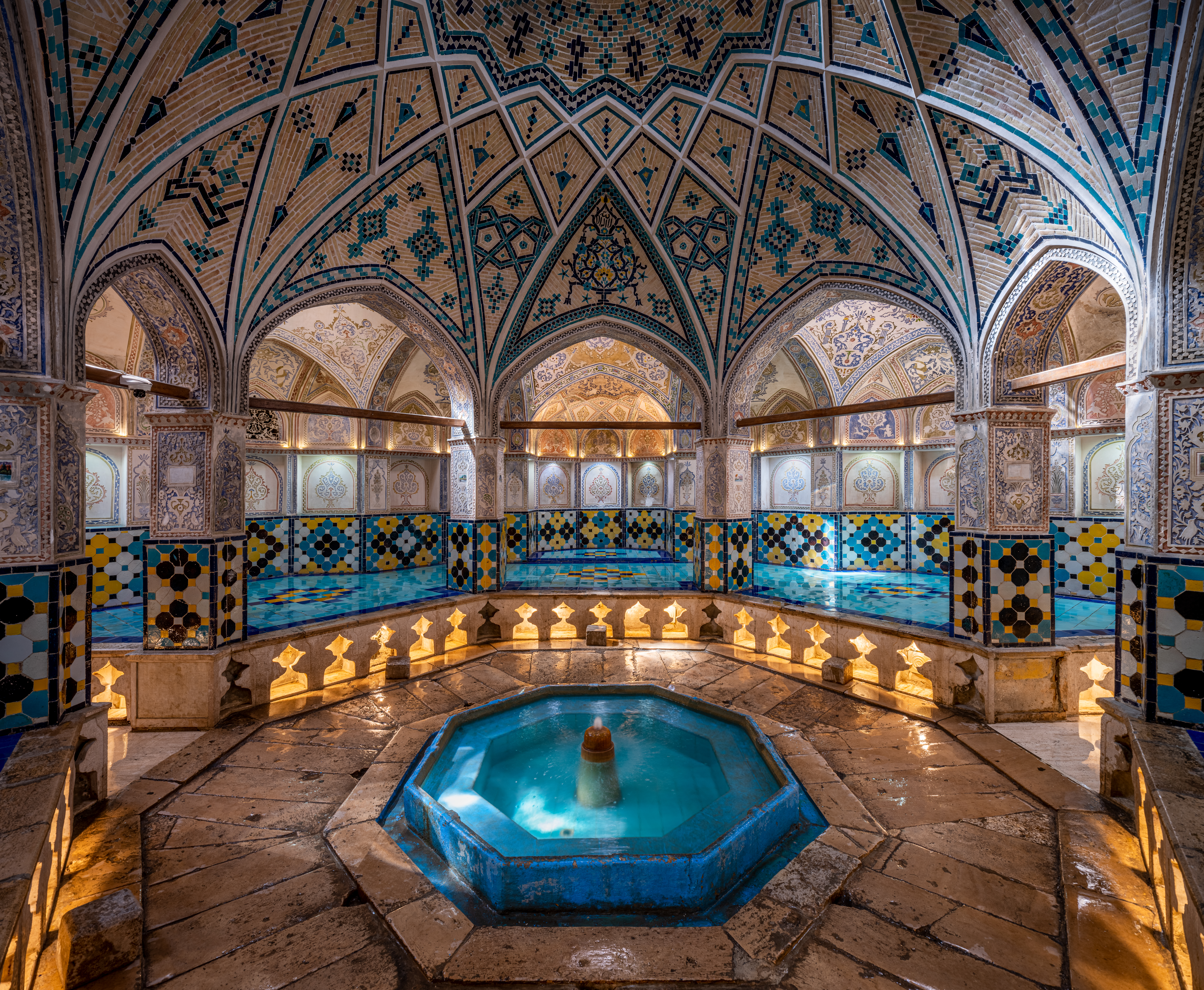
- Interactive map of the Sultan Amir Ahmad Bathhouse area

General information
- Architectural style: Safavid style Qajar style
- Location: Kashan, Iran
- Completed: 16th century

Sultan Amir Ahmad Bathhouse (Persian: حمام سلطان امیر احمد, romanized: Hammam-e Sultan Amir Ahmad), also known as the Qasemi Bathhouse, is a traditional Iranian public bathhouse (hammam) in Kashan, Iran. It was constructed in the 16th century, during the Safavid era; however, the bathhouse was damaged in 1778 as a result of an earthquake and was renovated during the Qajar era.

The bathhouse is named after Imamzadeh Sultan Amir Ahmad, whose mausoleum is nearby. It showcases an example of Iranian architecture with multiple domes. The water for the dome is supplied by two wells with water transported through ceramic pipes to different areas.

== Gallery ==
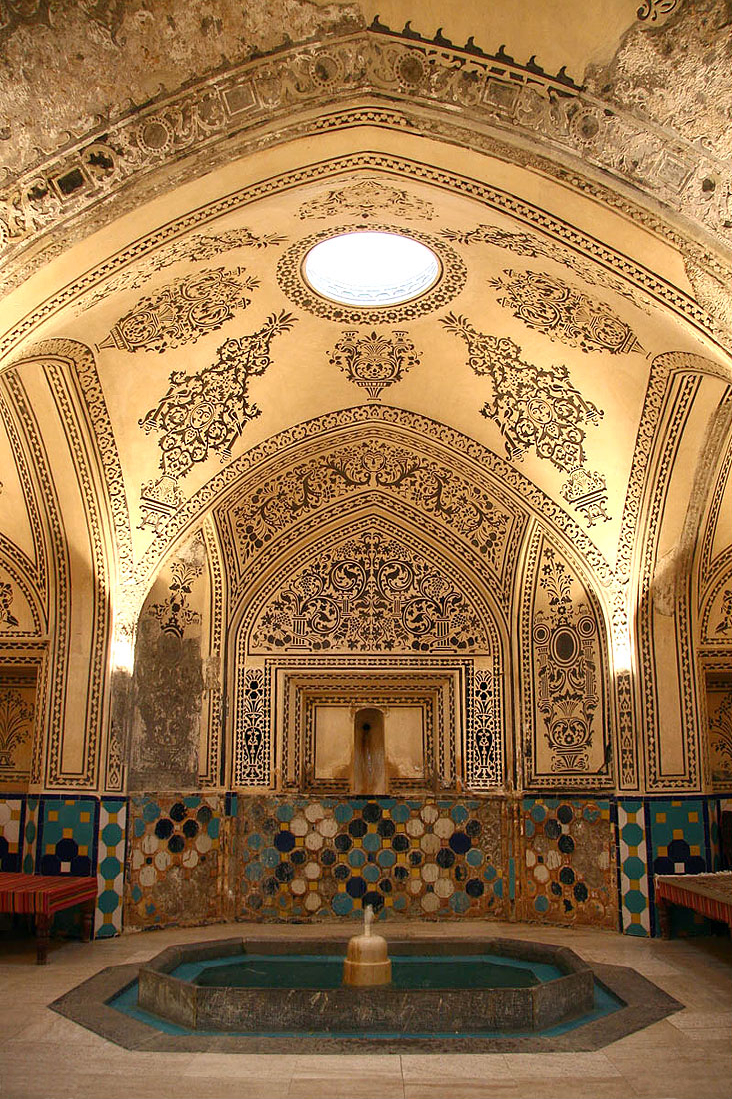
Interior decorations, plasterwork

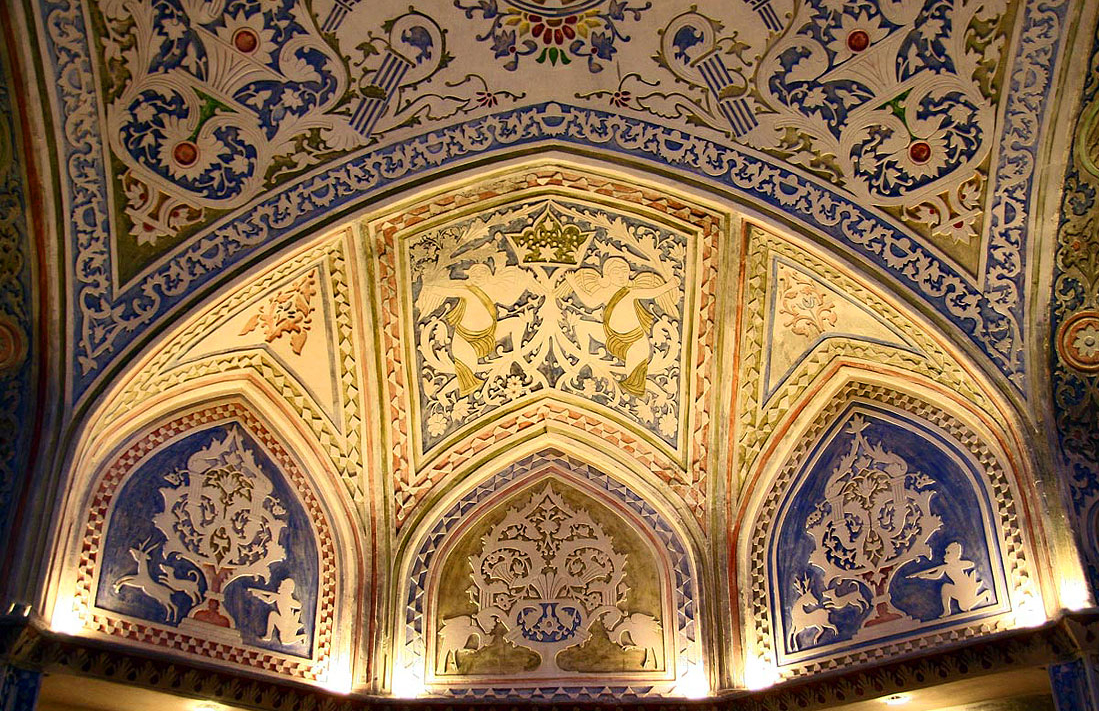
Interior decorations, colorful plasterwork

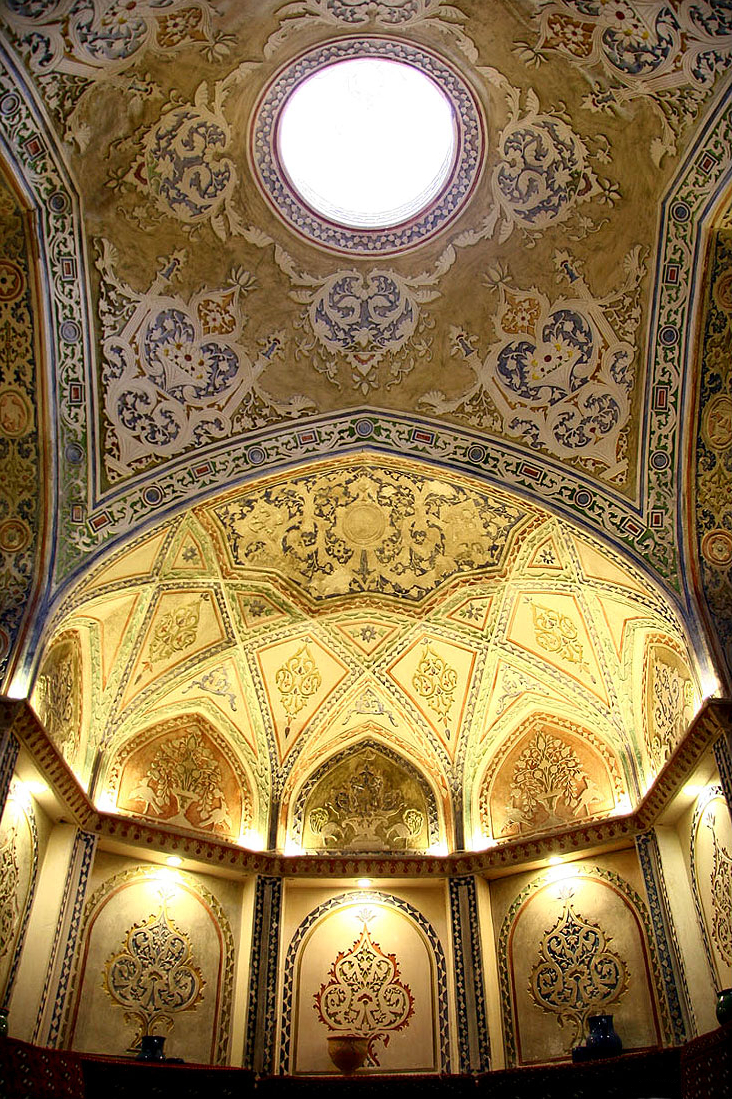
Interior decorations, plasterwork

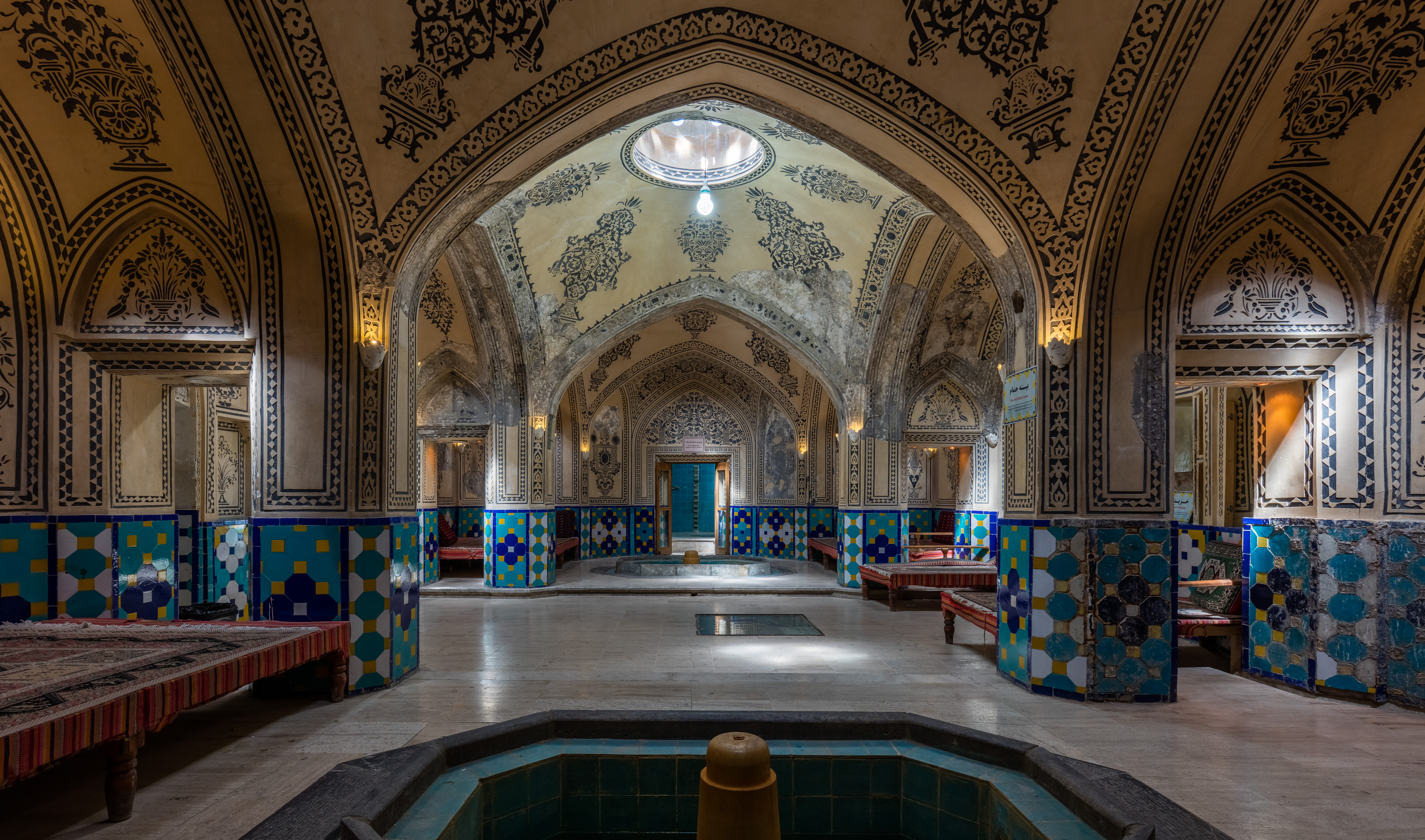
Interior decorations, brickwork & tilework

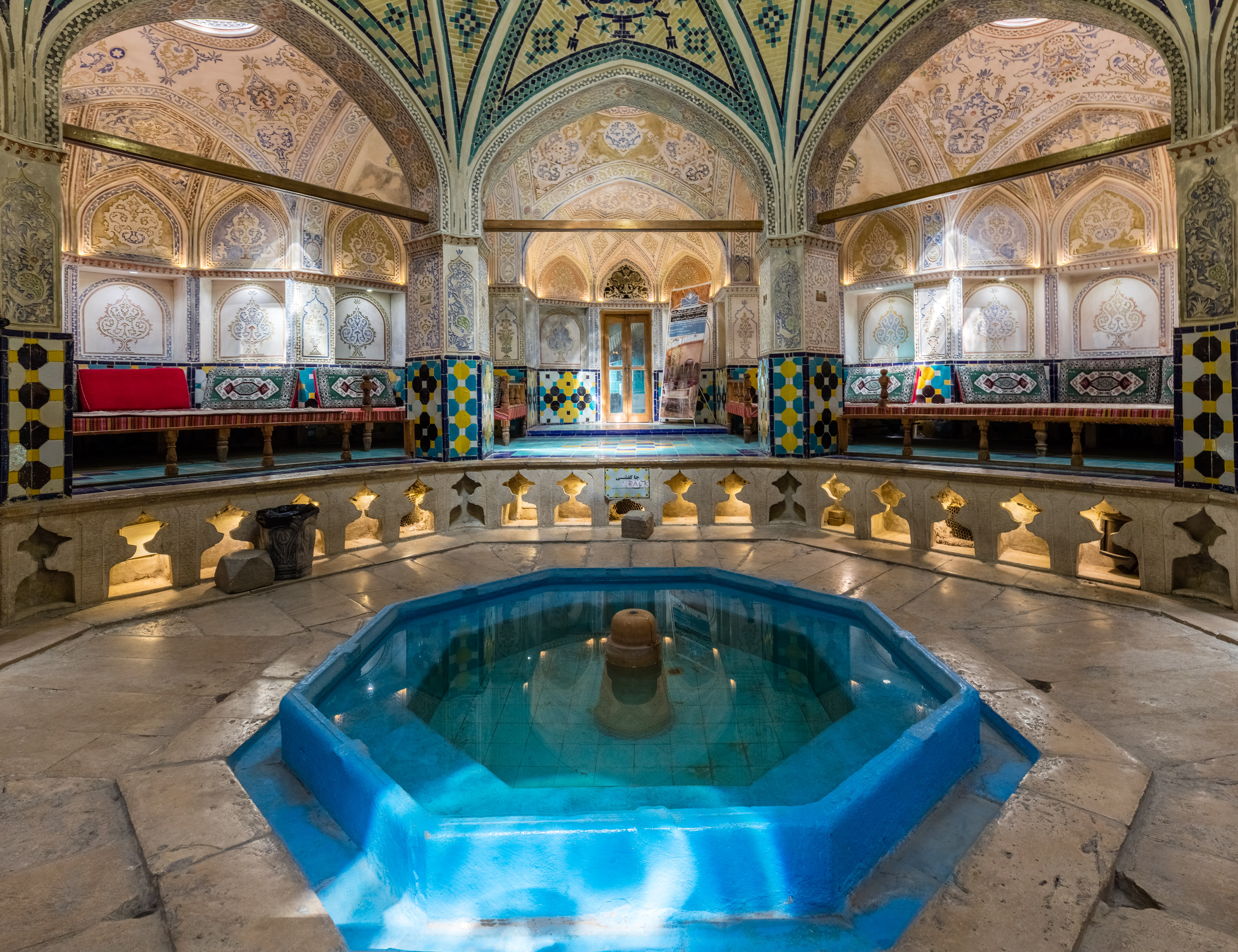
Part of the bathhouse is used as a tea house

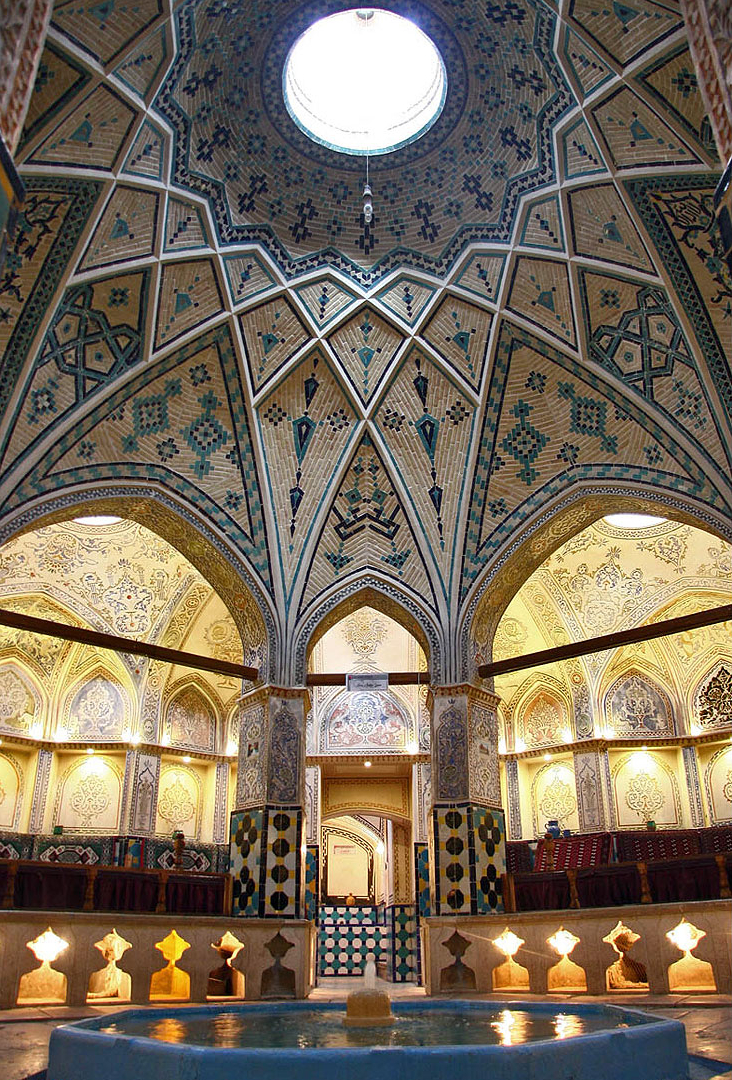
Interior decorations, brickwork & tilework

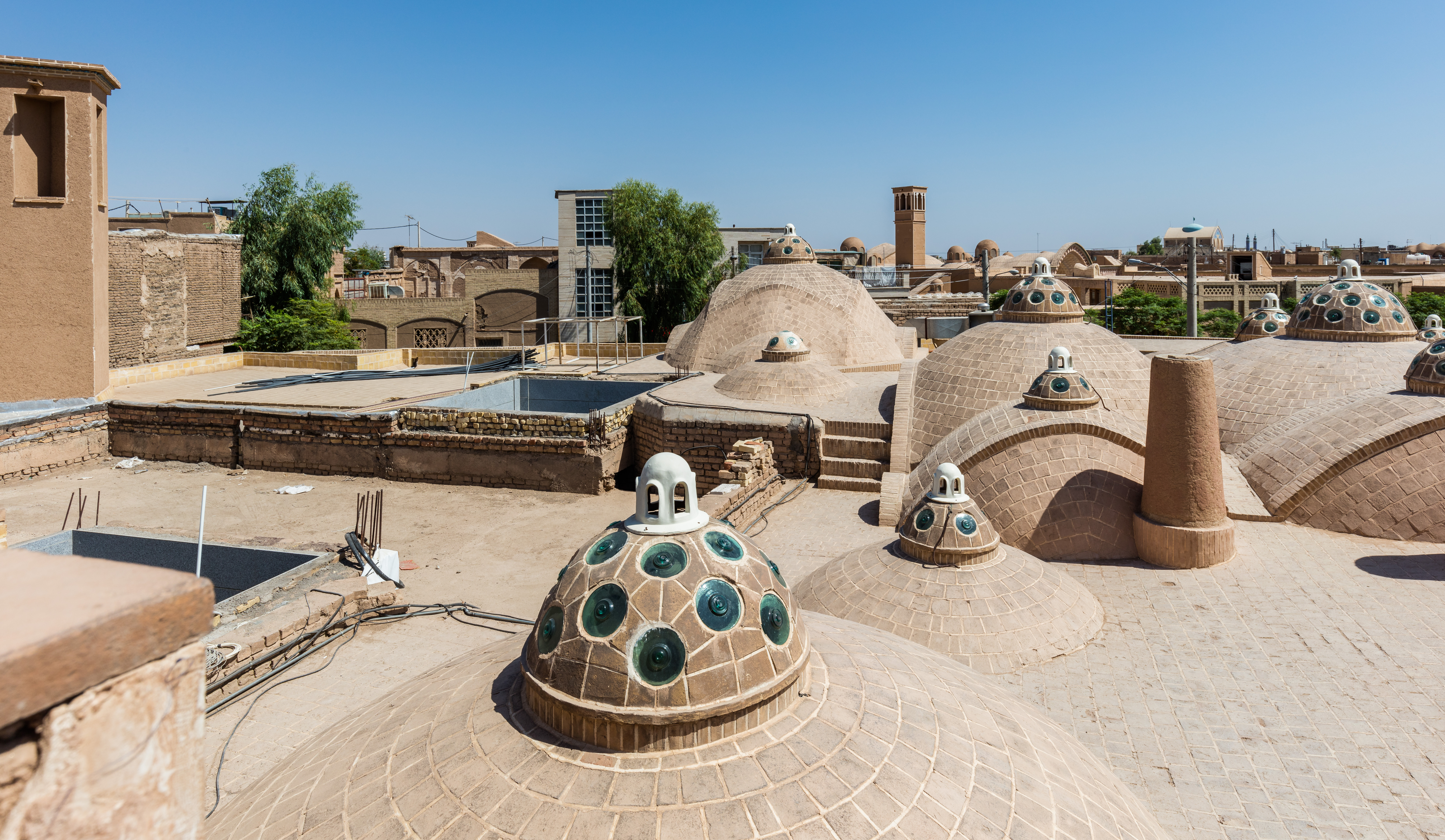
The roof domes

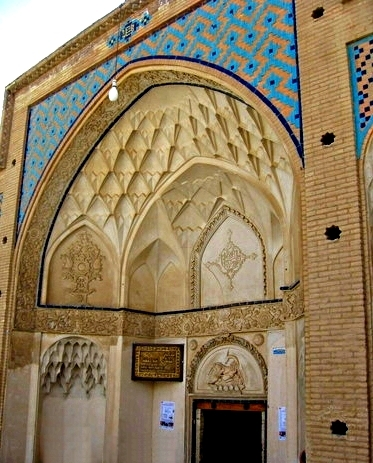
The Iwan at the entrance to the bathhouse

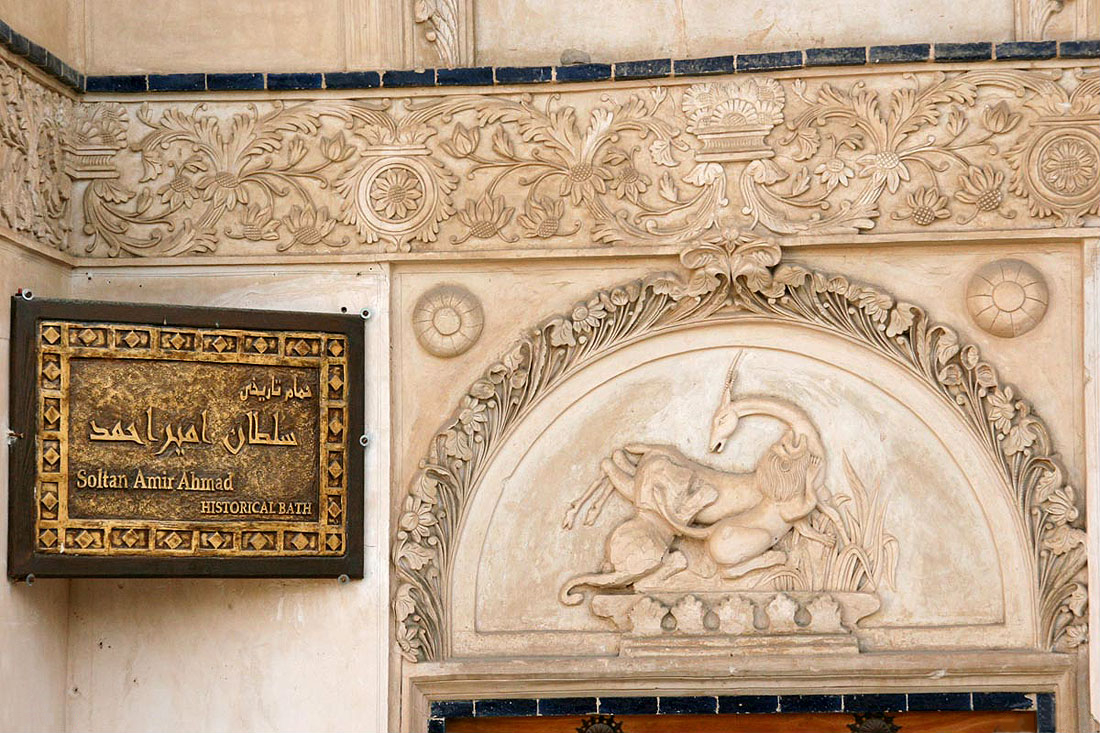
Stone relief above the entrance door
