= Jalali Castle =

Castle in Kashan, Iran

- قلعه جلالی
- Kashan, Iran

Site information
- Type: Castle
- Condition: Ruins

Location
- Coordinates: 33.9729°N 51.4404°E

Site history
- Built: 11. century
- Built by: Majd ed-Din Abolghassem Kashani
- Materials: Cob, mudbrick and brick

The Jalali Castle (Persian: قلعه جلالی) is located in Kashan, Iran.

== History ==
The walls around Kashan were built originally by Zobeyde Khatun, Harun al-Rashid's wife. She sponsored many developmental activities in the different cities of Islamic countries. In the early Seljuk era, Malik-Shah I ordered the repair of the walls and the strengthening of two of its castles and that the Jalali castle be built in the western part of the city. According to some historical documents there was a moat around the castle in that time.

The castle, tower and ramparts around the city of Kashan have protected its people very well down the centuries. For example, in 1138, Malek-Seljuk sieged Kashan for three months, but because of the strong fortification of Kashan, he could not capture the city and only destroyed some of the neighbouring villages. In 1198, Miajegh, the khwarazmid commander launched a military campaign against Kashan, but after four months ineffective siege of the city, he could only plunder the nearby villages, as Malek Seljuk had done. During these sieges the tower and ramparts were damaged severely because of stones and fire pots thrown by the mangonels of the invaders, but the destruction was repaired each time.

In the early Safavid era, the castle was used by outlaws and bandits as their cover and base. Therefore, Ismail I ordered the destruction of the castle, but for unknown reasons the order was not executed, instead a few developmental measures were taken and repairs to the castle were carried out making it stronger and more impregnable. According to the historical documents, the walls of the castle were 4 m thick and 6 m high at that time.

The consequence of the impregnability of the walls was the riot of Mohammad Khan Torkaman in the Safavid era, who misused the weakness of then-government in the time of Mohammad Khodabanda and rebelled and used this strong shelter as his base. Under the cover of the castle, Mohammad Khan Torkaman was a nightmare for the defenseless people of Kashan and the villages around it for 12 years. Torkaman's wickedness even reached the Safavid house and Khayr al-Nisa Begum, the mother of Abbas the Great, was killed by one of the Torkaman's men in Isfahan. When Abbas I ascended the throne, he immediately suppressed the rebellion and killed Torkaman and his men. After the quelling of the riot, because of peace and stability during the reign of Abbas I until the late Safavid era, the inner structures of the castle were destroyed gradually and only the thick wall, towers and Yakhchals, which were built with mudbricks, remained.

The gradual destruction of the castle was not the only historical misfortune of this defense structure. After the Afghan invasion, they damaged the castle severely, but in the era of Nader Shah, it was partly repaired.

The 1778 Kashan earthquake destroyed the towers and ramparts of Jalali castle even more but, by the order of Karim Khan Zand, the castle was repaired again by the governor of Kashan, Abdolrazzagh Khan and two gates were added to the five gates of the castle. The moat, which was dug again around the castle was the most important cause of Agha Mohammad Khan's failure in capturing the city.

The last battle of the castle was during the Persian Constitutional Revolution in the time of Nayeb Hossein Khan Kashi's bandits and his sons.

The most important gate of the castle was the Dolat gate. It was important because of the neighboring buildings like the bazaar and a caravansary. Because of the contemporary expansion of the city, the neighboring buildings have been destroyed.

== See also ==
- List of historical structures in Isfahan province
