= Tabriziha Mosque =

Shi'ite mosque in Kashan, Iran

- مسجد تبریزی‌ها
- Location of the mosque in Iran

Religion
- Affiliation: Shia Islam
- Ecclesiastical or organizational status: Mosque
- Status: Active

Location
- Location: Kashan, Isfahan Province
- Country: Iran
- Interactive map of Tabriziha Mosque
- Coordinates: 33°59′04″N 51°26′53″E

Architecture
- Type: Mosque architecture
- Style: Qajar
- Founder: Mohammad Hosseyn Tabrizi
- Completed: 1797 CE

Iran National Heritage List
- Official name: Tabriziha Mosque
- Type: Built
- Designated: 3 May 1974
- Reference no.: 972
- Conservation organization: Cultural Heritage, Handicrafts and Tourism Organization of Iran

The Tabriziha Mosque (Persian: مسجد تبریزی‌ها), also known as the Tabrizi Mosque, is a Shi'ite mosque, located in Malek bazarche of Kashan, in the province of Isfahan, Iran.

The mosque was completed in 1797 CE, during the Qajar era, and was added to the Iran National Heritage List on 3 May 1974, administered by the Cultural Heritage, Handicrafts and Tourism Organization of Iran.

== Architecture ==
The mosque was built by Mohammad Hosseyn Tabrizi in 1797 CE. Both sides of its big door have been decorated with haftrang tiles. Its vestibule has a stucco inscription. The ceiling of its shabestan has 18 arches, which have been decorated with bricks and tiles. The columns have been covered with tiles. The four sides of shabestan and around the columns there are inscriptions of the verses of Koran. The inscriptions have been written in white Naskh on a persian blue background. The triangle under the inscriptions have been decorated with designs and shapes. The mihrab of the mosque has been decorated with tiles and has a stucco inscription. On the inscription, some Koran verses have been written in white Thuluth script on the ultramarine background.

== See also ==
- Shia Islam in Iran
- List of mosques in Iran
- List of historical structures in Isfahan province
