= Saraye Ameriha =

Historic house in Kashan, Iran

- هتل سرای عامری ها
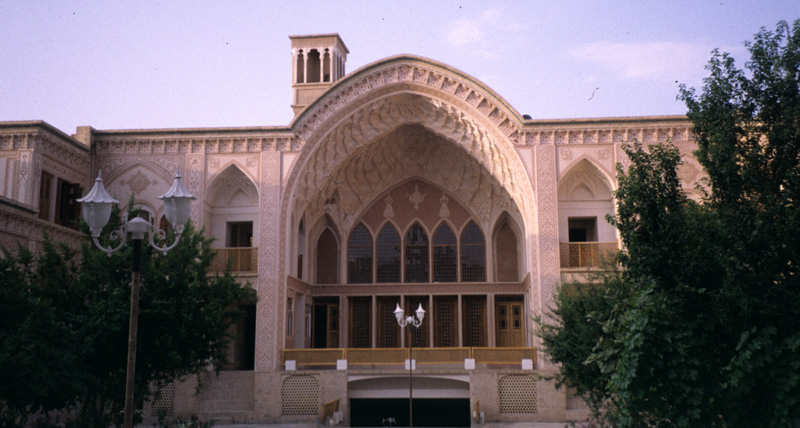
- Saraye Ameriha at Kashan

General information
- Location: Kashan, Iran
- Opening: 2014
- Renovated: 2014
- Owner: Ezam Construction

Technical details
- Size: 9000 Square meters

Design and construction
- Awards and prizes: TripAdvisor Travelers' Choice

Other information
- Number of rooms: 27

Saraye Ameriha is a historic house in Kashan, Iran. It was originally built as a family residence during Zand dynasty for Agha Āmeri, the governor of Kashan, and has since been restored and transformed into a traditional-style museum and hotel. Being the largest traditional house in Kashan, it has several interior and exterior yards, each consisting of pools and many rooms. It also has the highest wind catcher in Kashan.

== History ==
Built around 200 years ago, Saraye Ameriha served as a family residence during the Zand dynasty for Agha Āmeri, the governor of Kashan. It has since been restored and transformed into a traditional-style hotel.

Restoration began in 1999 due to earthquake damage and years of neglect. The first phase, completed in 2014, focused on restoring the house using its original blueprints. Phase two ended in 2017, and phase three is ongoing. The inauguration ceremony in 2014 was attended by notable officials, including Vice President Masoud Soltanifar.

== Structure ==
The Āmeri House is 9,000 square metres (97,000 sq ft) in size. It contains dozens of rooms, two bathhouses, and seven courtyards with gardens and fountains. The main structure is made of brick. Mud and straw are used in the insulation. The inner spaces are decorated with gypsum and mirror works. It has the highest wind catcher (Badgir) amongst houses in Kashan, and like other traditional Iranian houses, it consists of interior and exterior sections, porches, pools, yards, crew yards, stables covered with ornamentations such as stucco, Muqarnas, paintings on plaster, woodwork, woodcarving and other ornamentation arts. It is close to some monuments of Kashan like Tabatabai House and Borojerdi House.

== Amenities ==
Saraye Ameriha has several main yards, each with a large or small pool, surrounded by guest rooms and suites. Currently, it has 27 rooms, including presidential and royals. Other facilities include a carpet weaving house, conference room for national and international cultural programmes and seminars, Sohrab Sepehri Gallery of art, souvenir shop, coffee house, restaurant and other saloons and halls. The main structure is made of brick. Mud and straw are used in the insulation. The inner spaces are decorated with gypsum and mirror works.

== Gallery ==
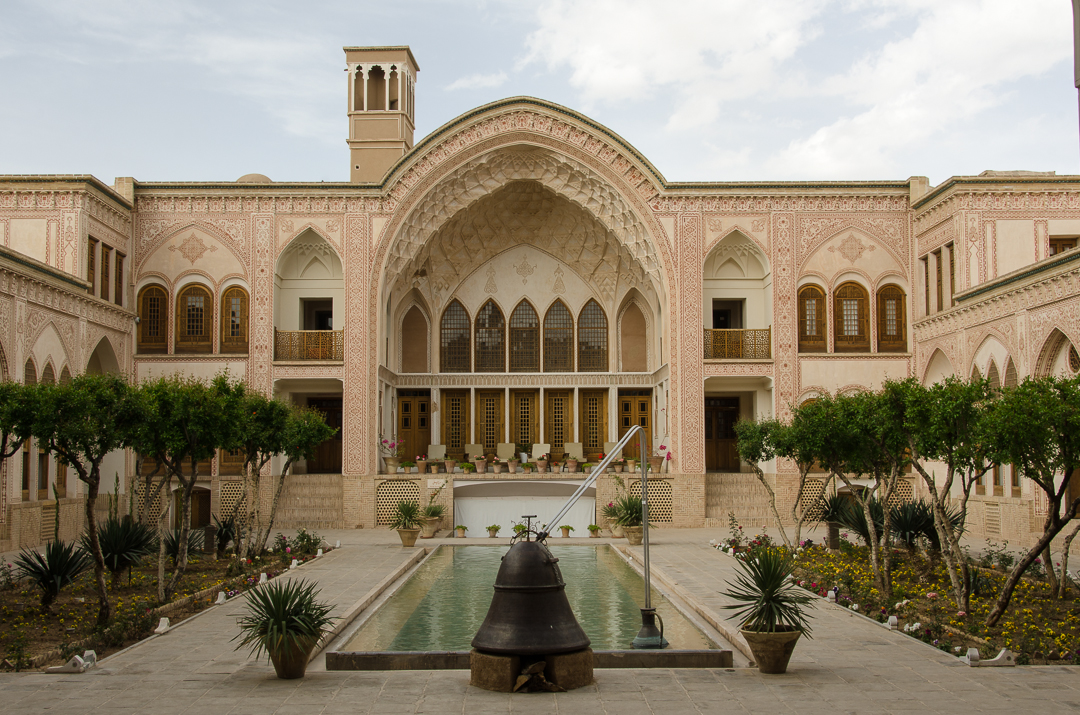
The main courtyard of the Āmeri House.

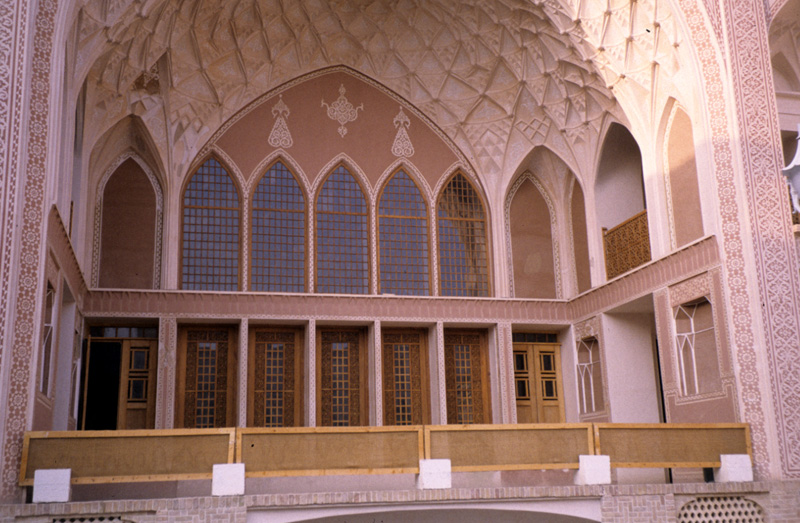
The panjdari of the main iwan (balcony) of the Āmeri House.

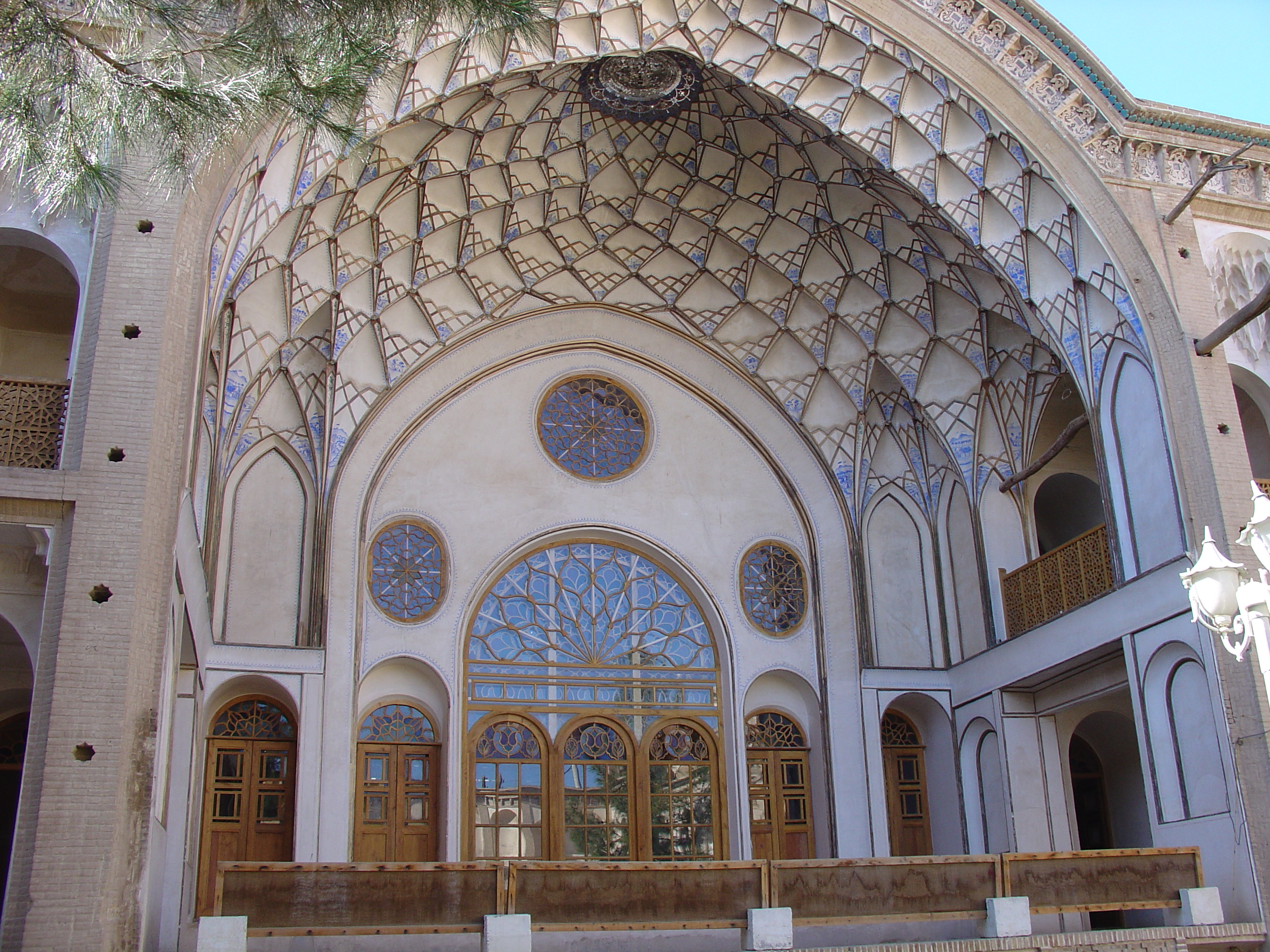
An iwan (balcony) in one of the courtyards of the Āmeri House.

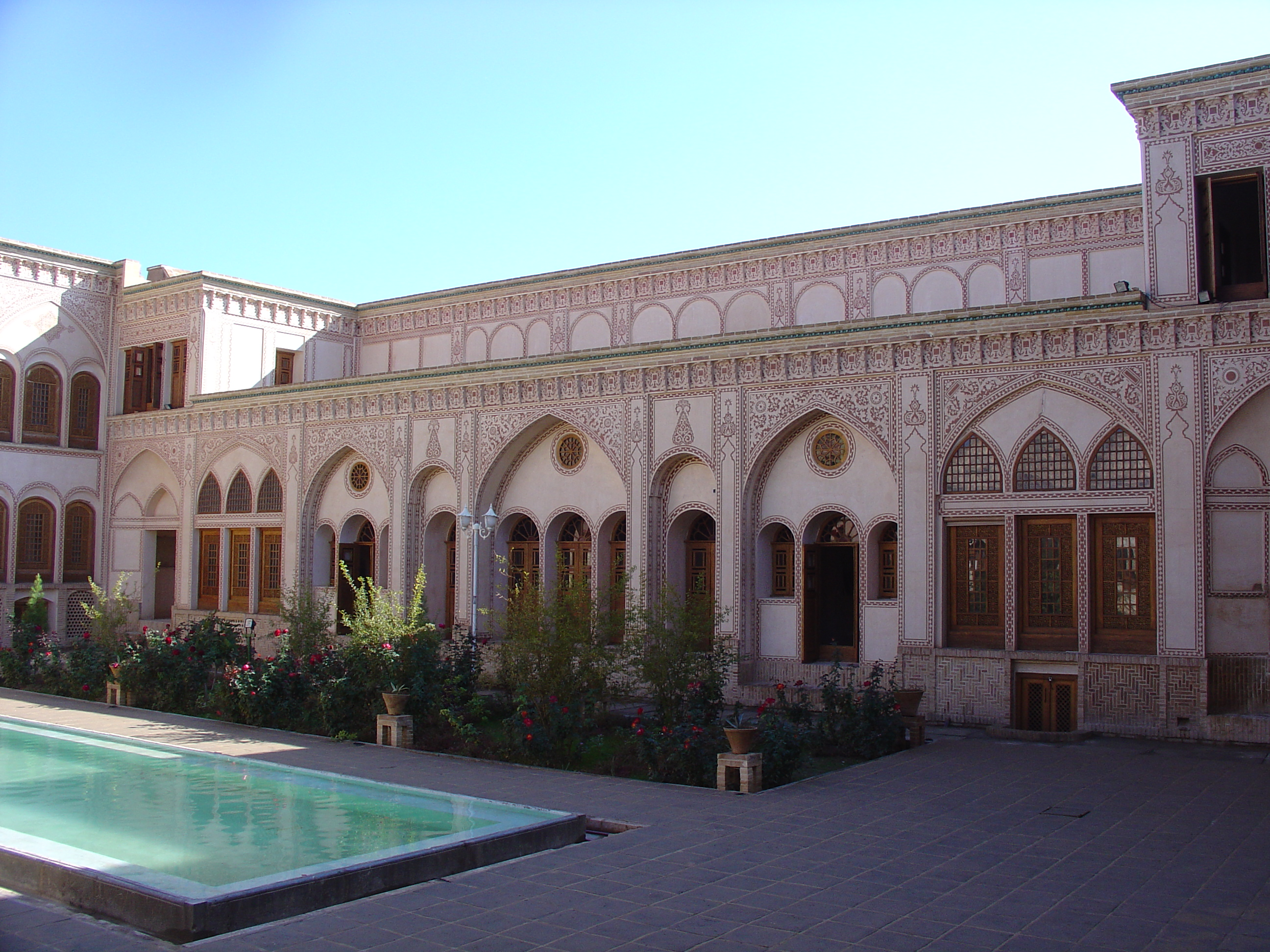
A courtyard in the Āmeri House.

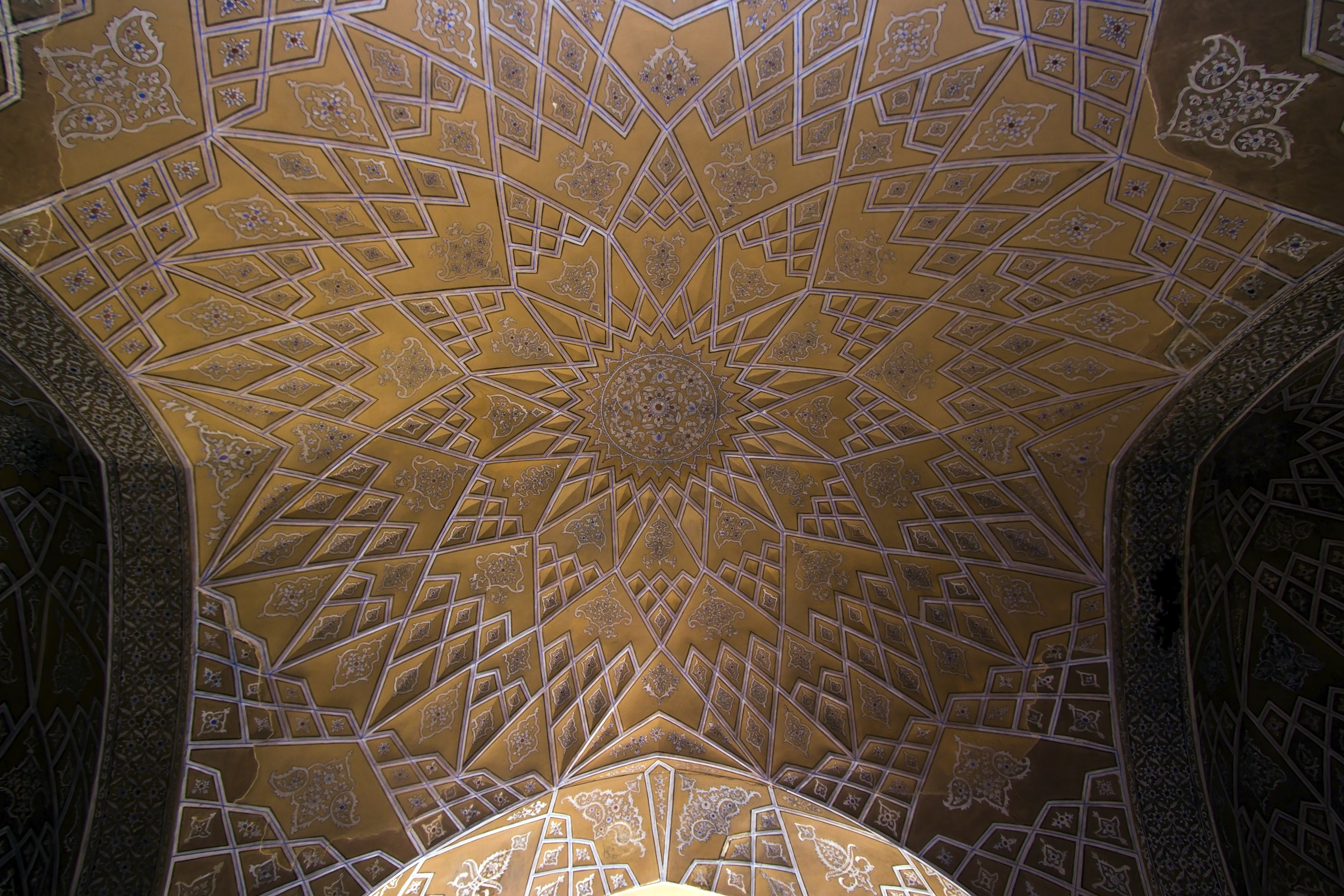
A ceiling inside the Āmeri House.

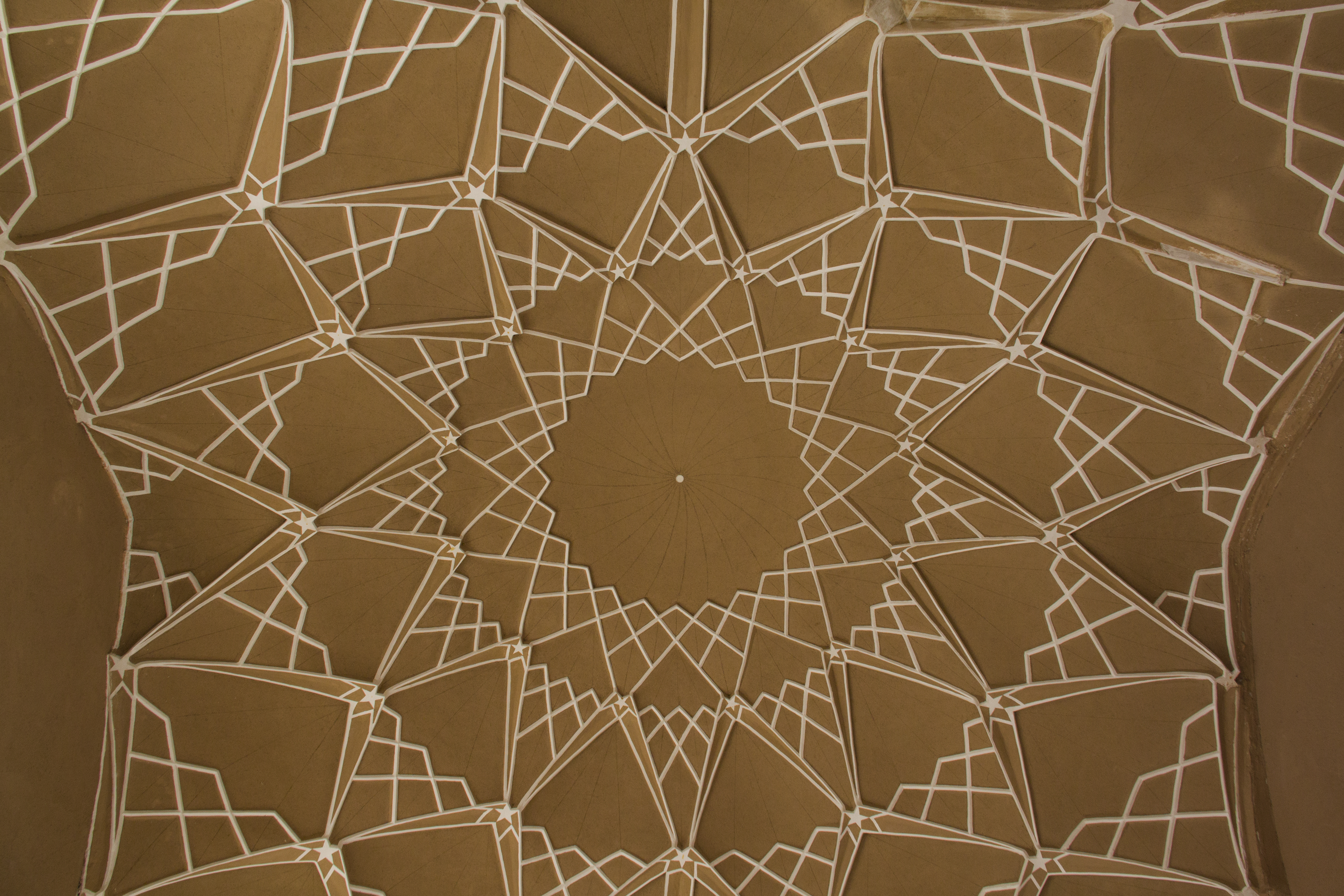
A ceiling inside the Āmeri House.

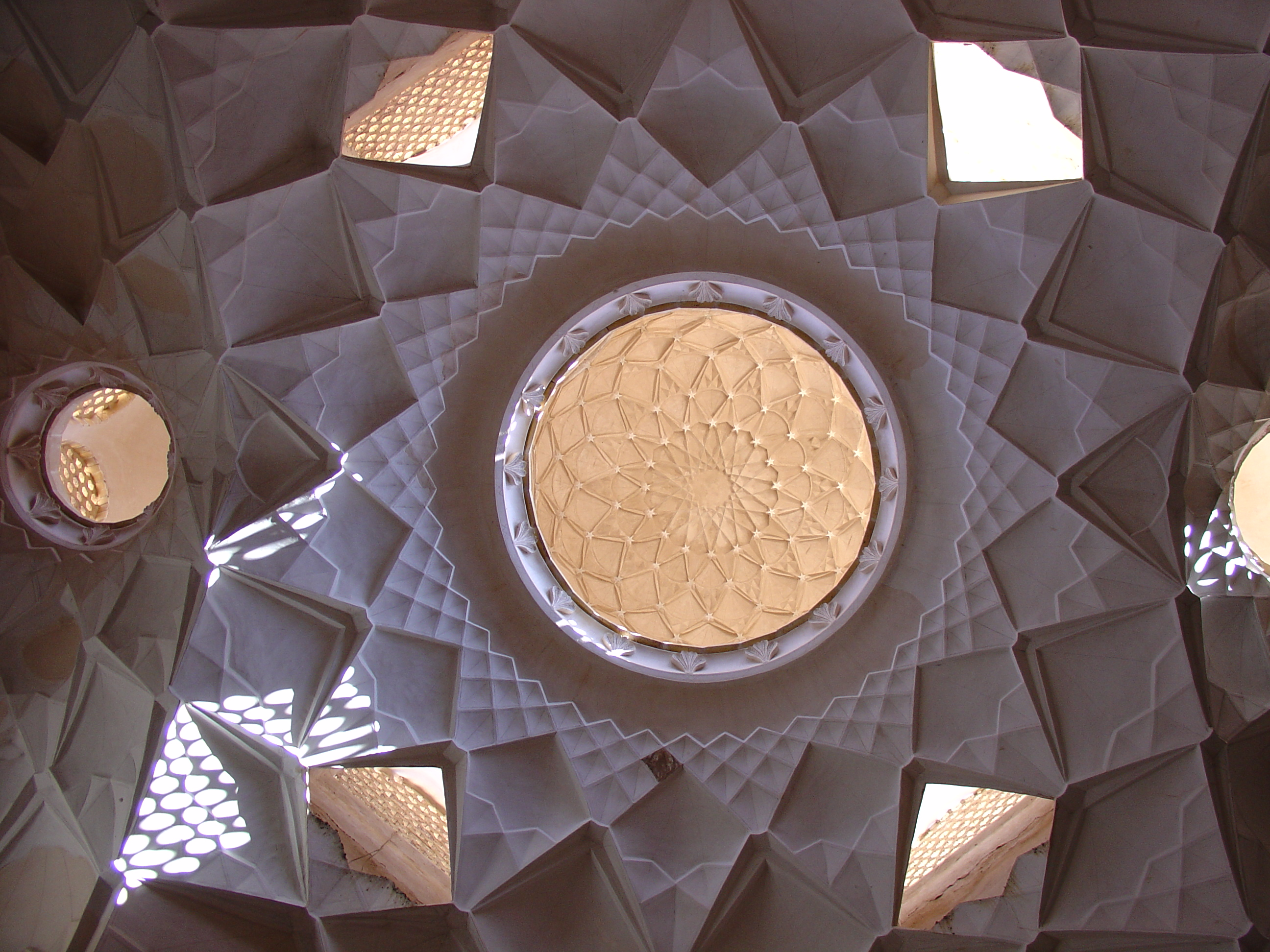
A ceiling inside the Āmeri House.

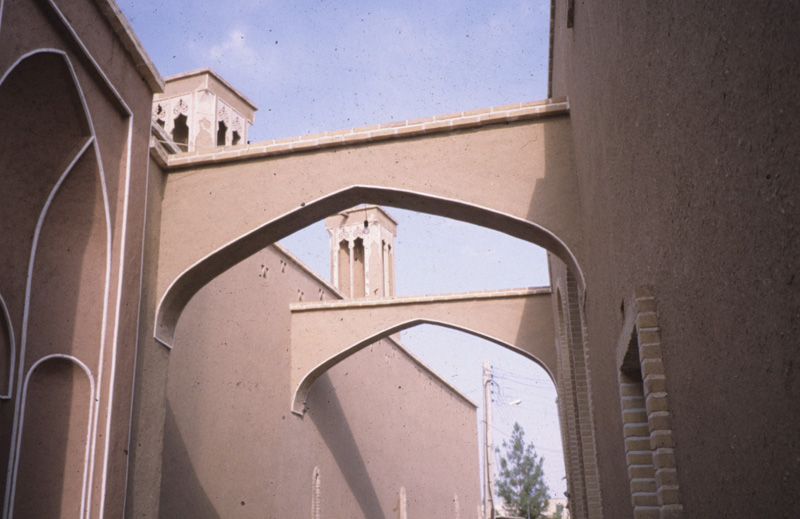
A kuche (alley) located to the east of the Āmeri House.

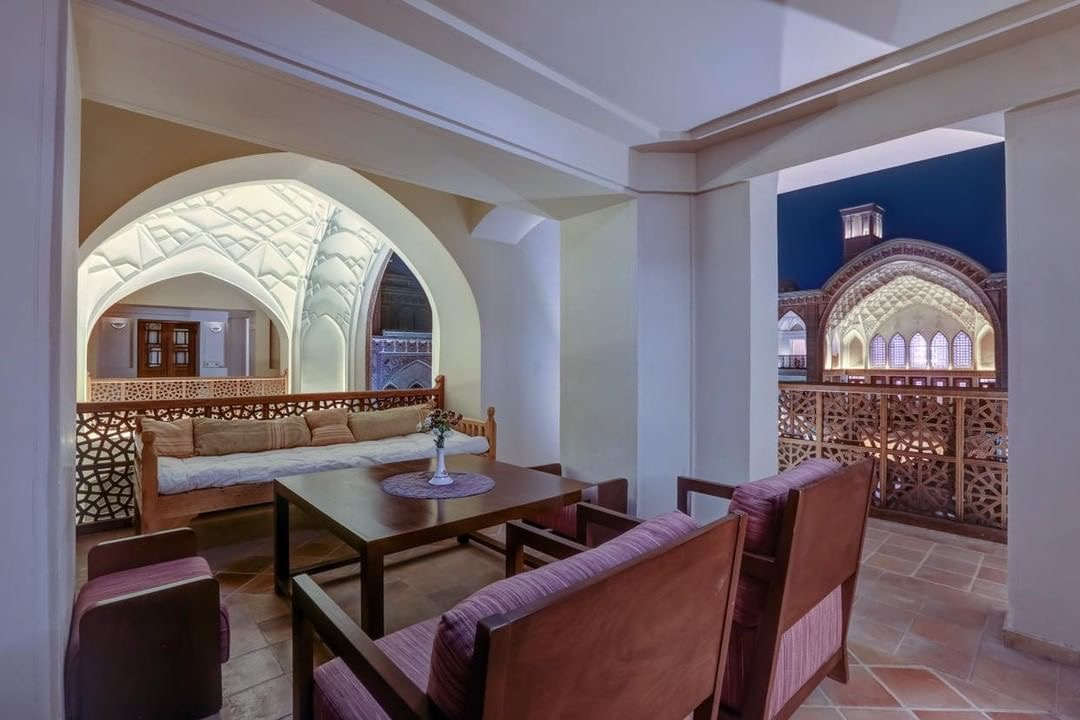
