= Āmeri House =

Historic house in Kashan, Iran

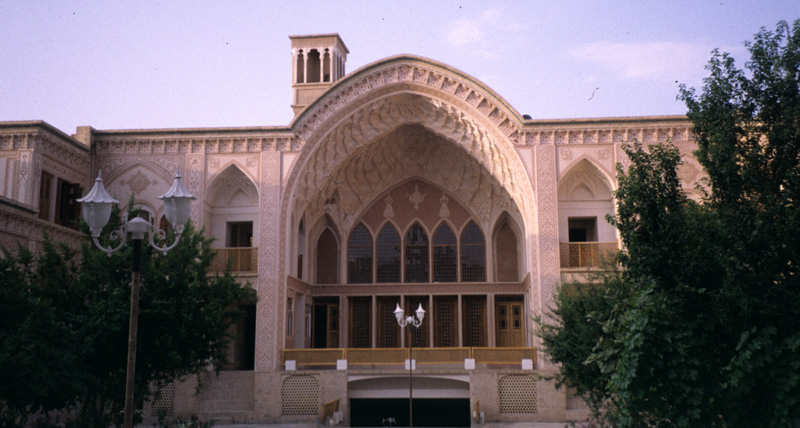
- The northern iwan (balcony) in the main courtyard of the Āmeri House.

General information
- Architectural style: Iranian
- Location: Kashan, Iran
- Coordinates: 33.9750°N 51.4419°E

The Āmeris House (Persian: خانه عامری‌ها) is a large historic house in Kashan, Iran. It was originally built as a family residence during the Zand era for Agha Āmeri, the governor of Kashan, and is now restored and transformed into a traditional-style hotel.

Like the other historic houses that are located nearby, the Āmeri House was damaged through earthquakes in the 18th century, and was then rebuilt in the 19th century. It is one of the prominent historic houses of Kashan, together with the Borujerdi House, the Tabātabāei House, and others.

== Structure ==
The Āmeri House is a huge property of 9,000 square metres (97,000 sq ft). It contains dozens of rooms, two bathhouses, and seven courtyards with gardens and fountains. The main structure is made of brick. Mud and straw are used in the insulation. The inner spaces are decorated with gypsum and mirror works. Underneath the complex are a series of tunnels. The Āmeri House is now a traditional hotel.

== Gallery ==
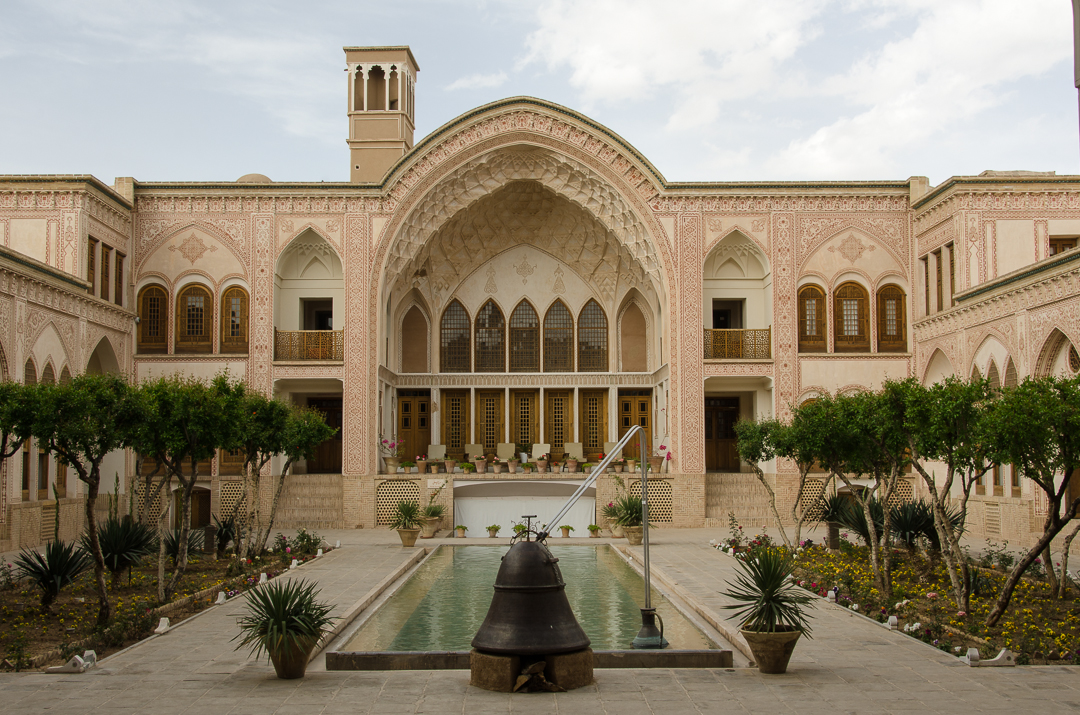
The main courtyard of the Āmeri House.

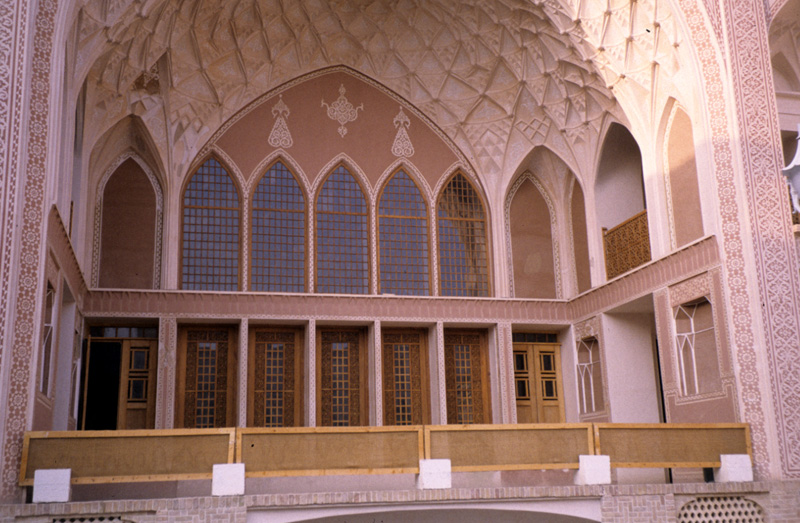
The panjdari of the main iwan (balcony) of the Āmeri House.

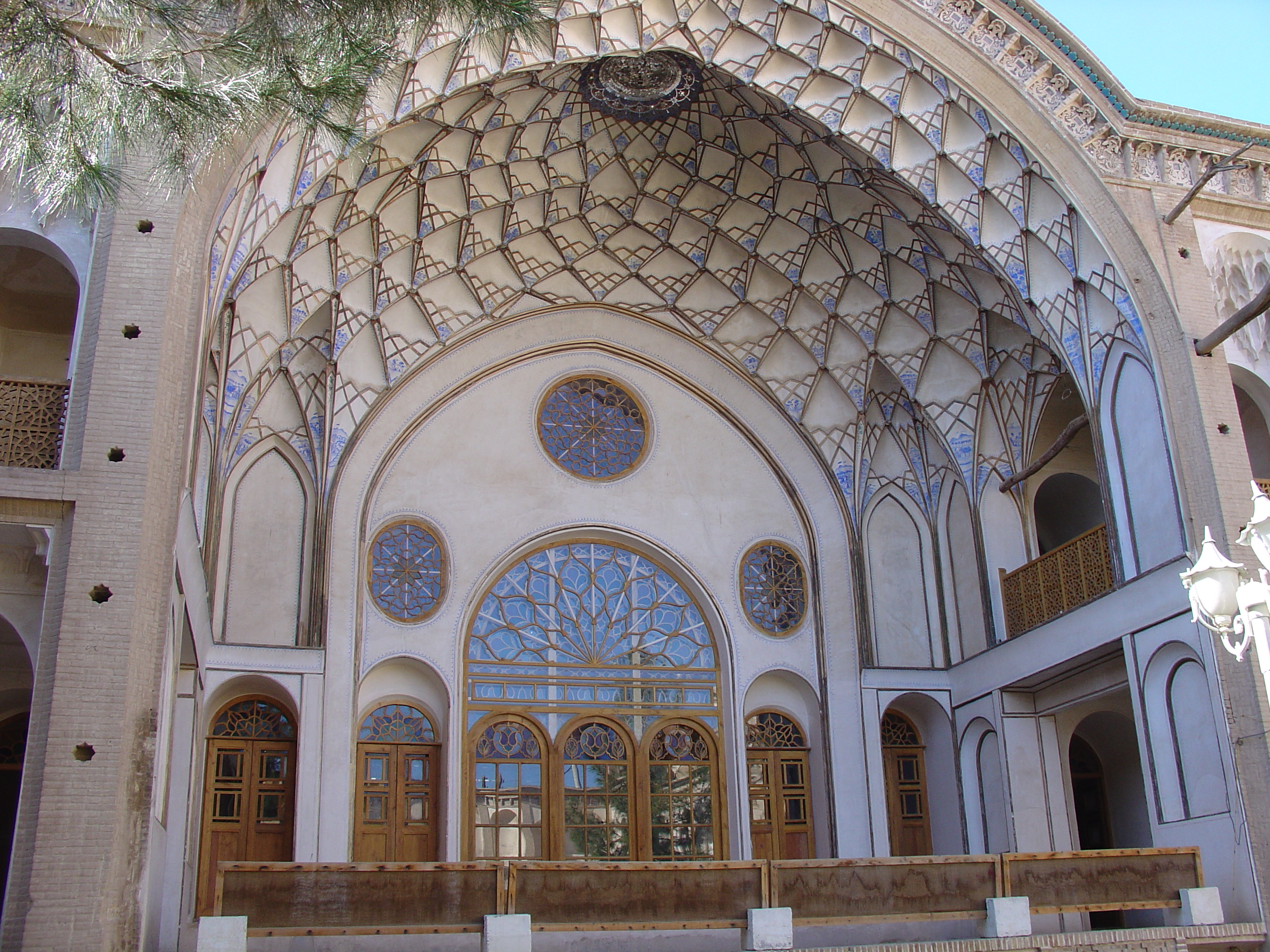
An iwan (balcony) in one of the courtyards of the Āmeri House.

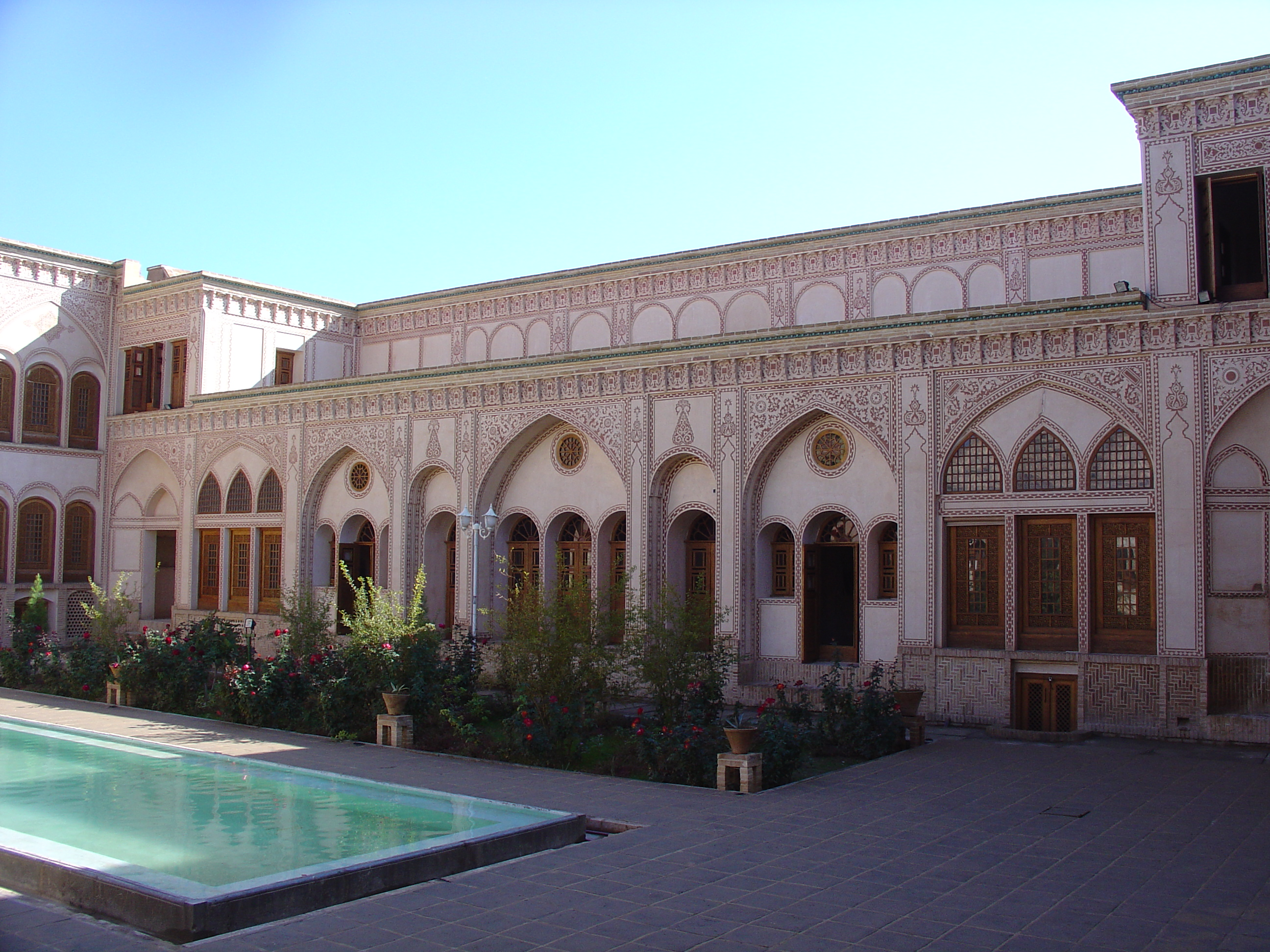
A courtyard in the Āmeri House.

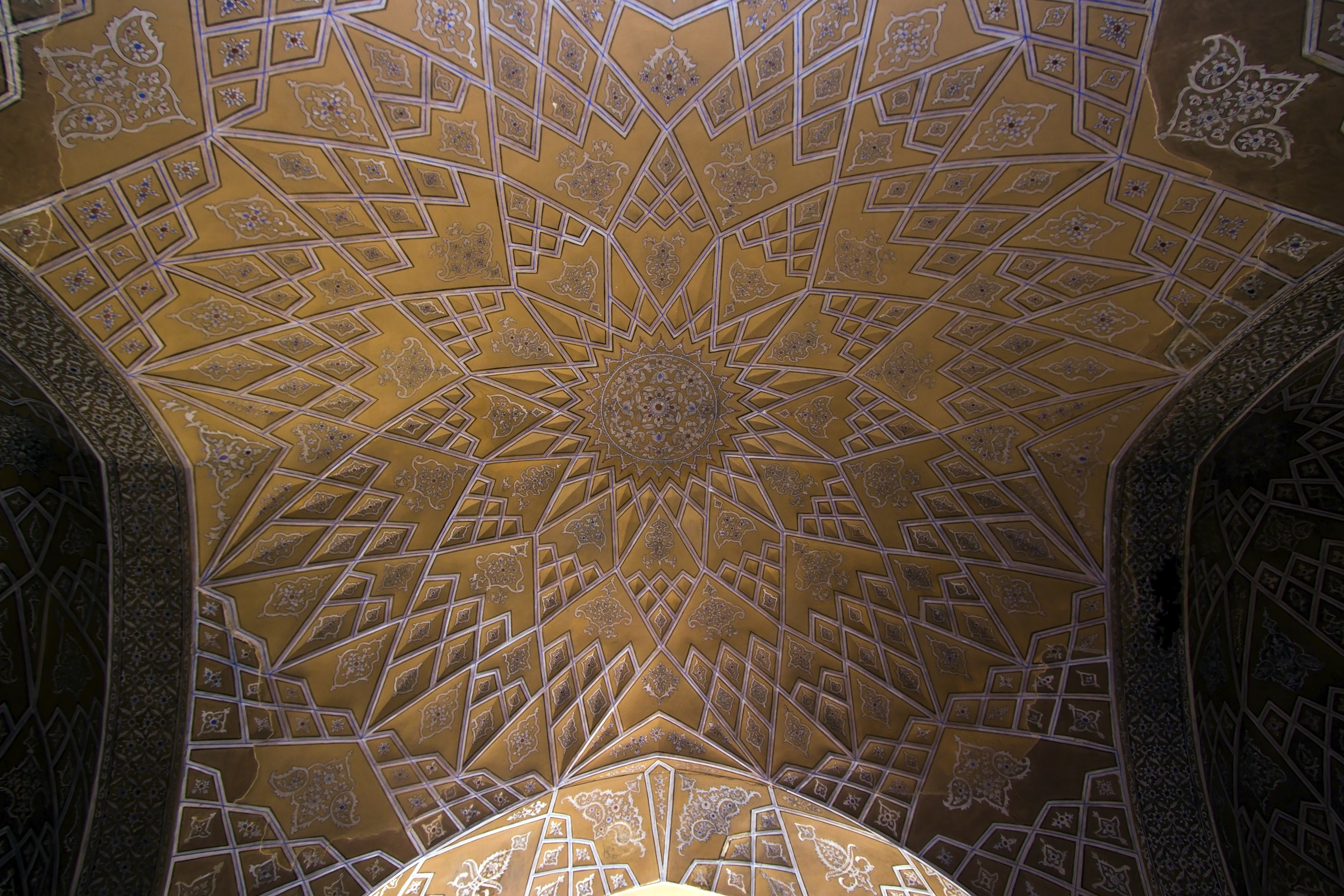
A ceiling inside the Āmeri House.

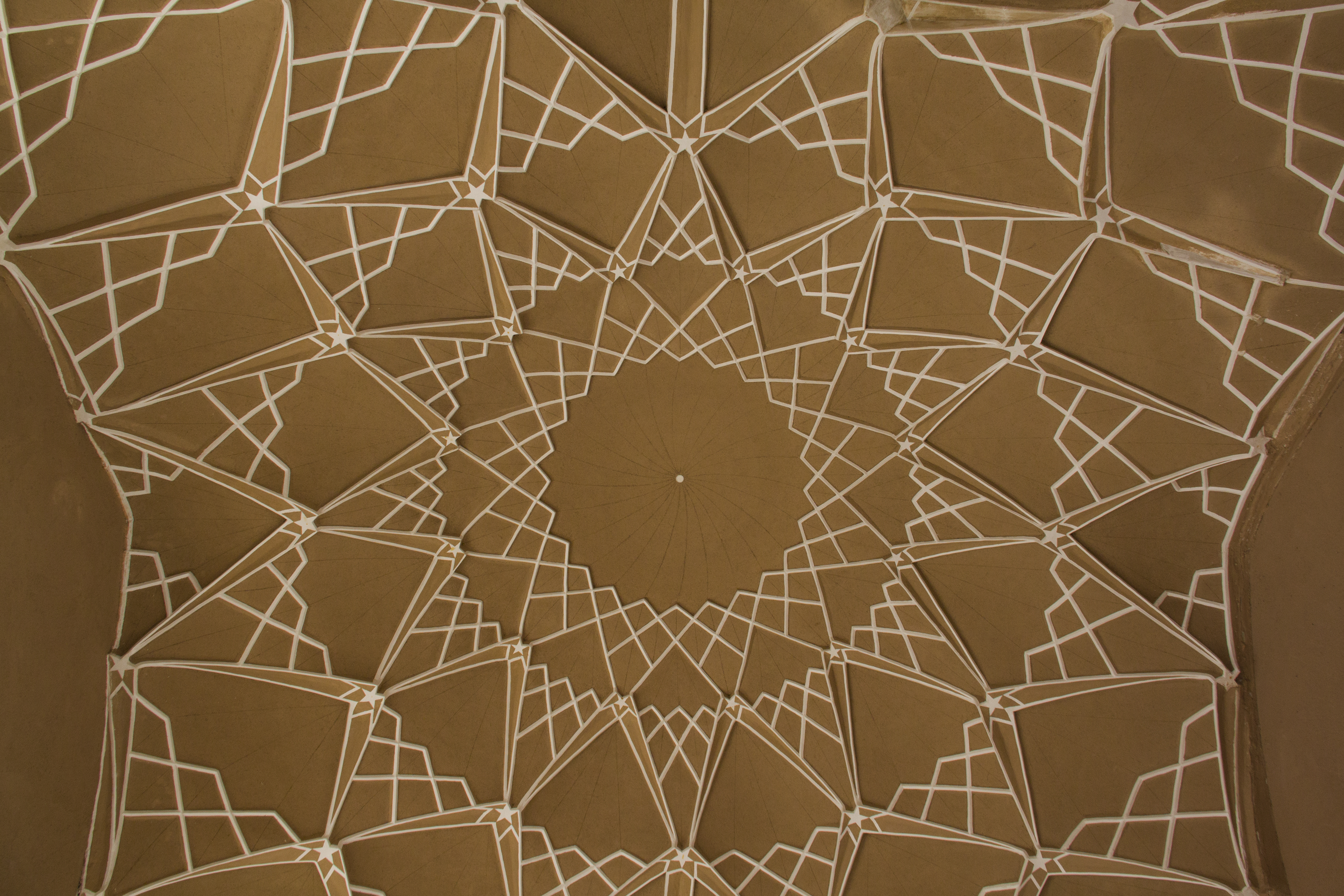
A ceiling inside the Āmeri House.

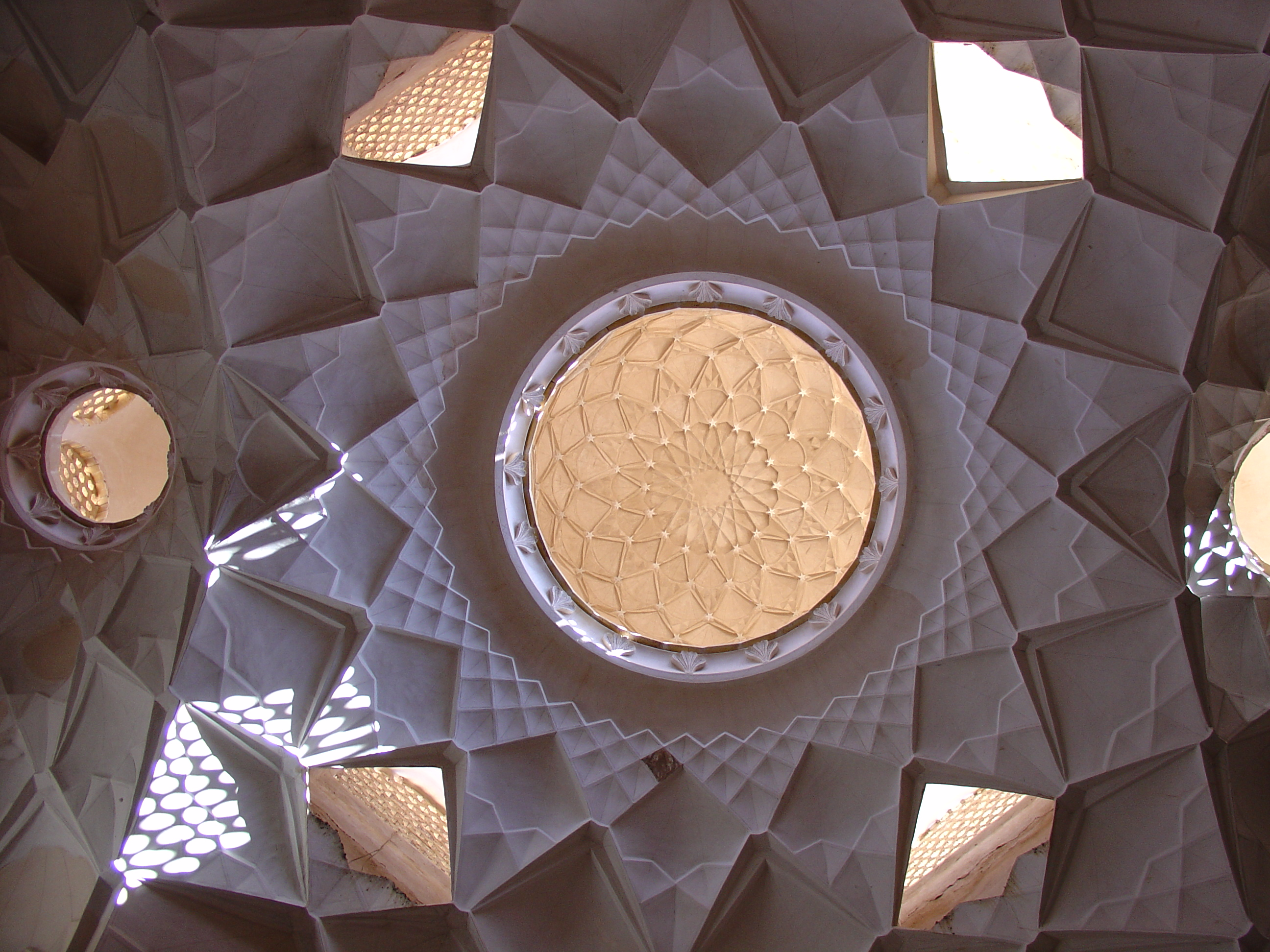
A ceiling inside the Āmeri House.

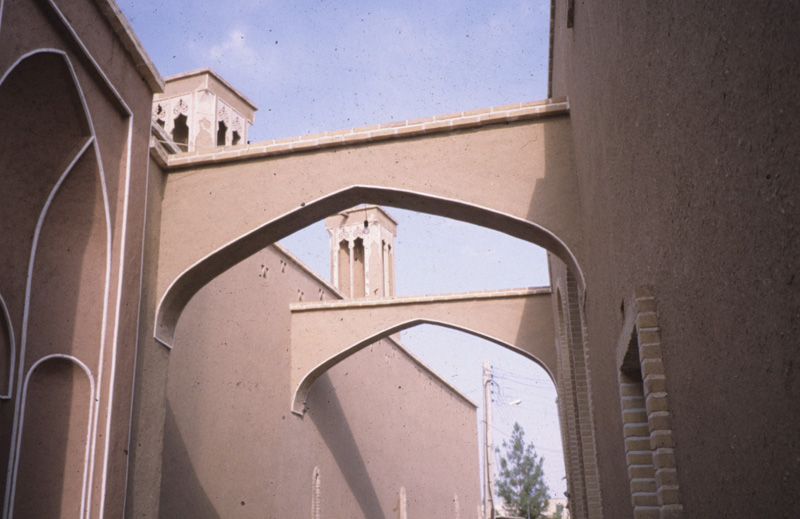
A kuche (alley) located to the east of the Āmeri House.
