= Panjdari =

Iranian architectural element

A panjdari (Persian: پنج‌دری, lit. 'Five Doors') is a traditional element of vernacular Iranian architecture.

The word comes from "panj" (پنج five) and "dar" (در window or door), meaning "five windowed room".

By definition, a panjdari is a large room that is often flanked to the main talar of the house, and most often connected to a large balcony, where five large contiguous windows provide primary views to the main courtyard of the house.

In modern terms, the room would be the equivalent of the living room of the house. However, traditional Persian houses were very large and had many rooms. The panjdari was therefore a main daily hub of the inhabitants.

== Gallery ==
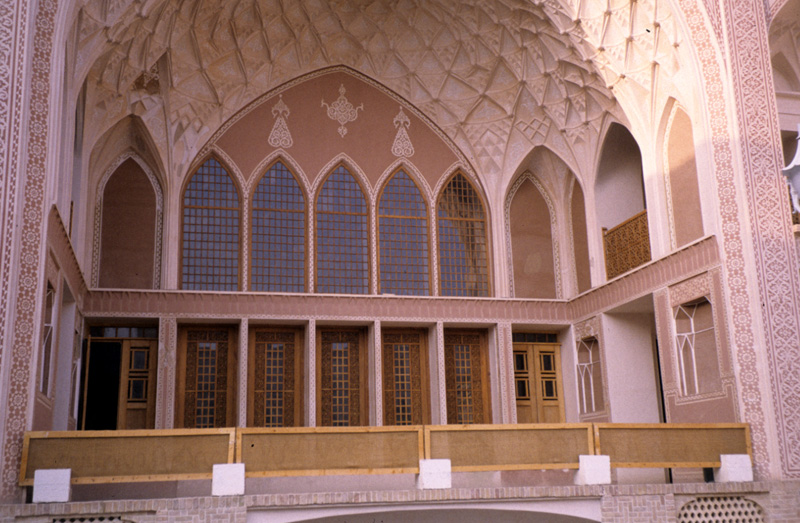
A fine example of a Panj-dari seen from the main balcony of the Ameri House, Kashan

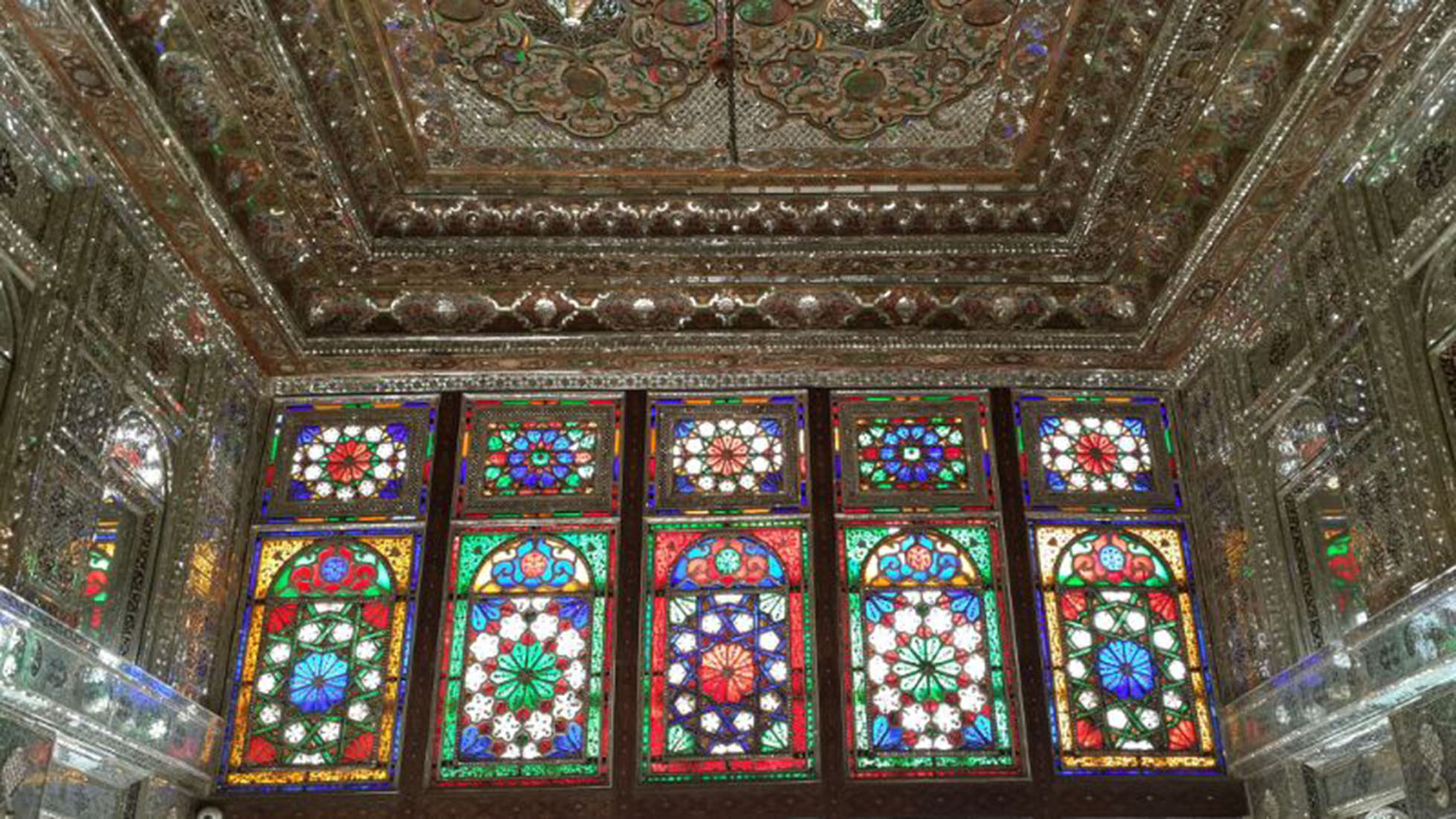

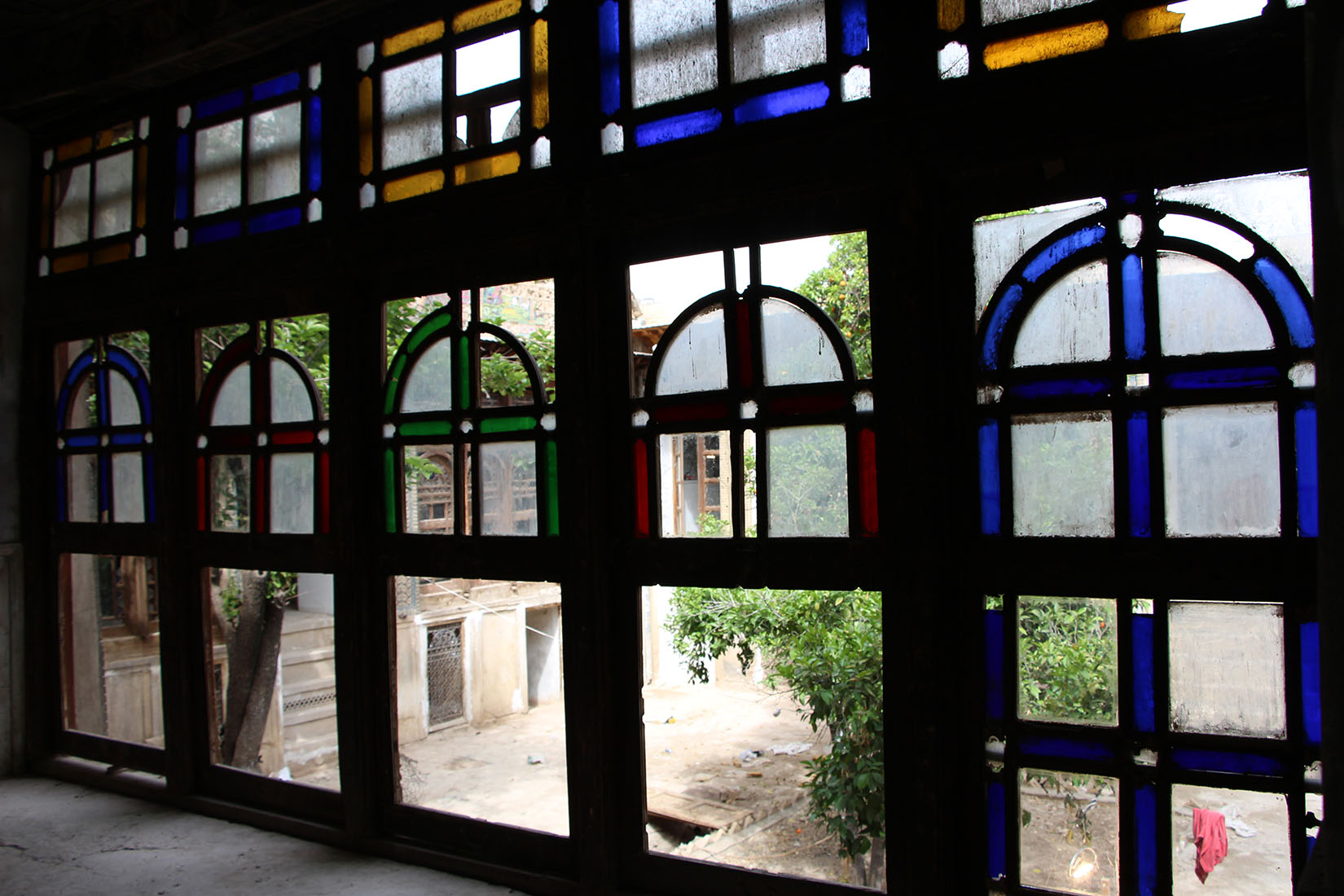

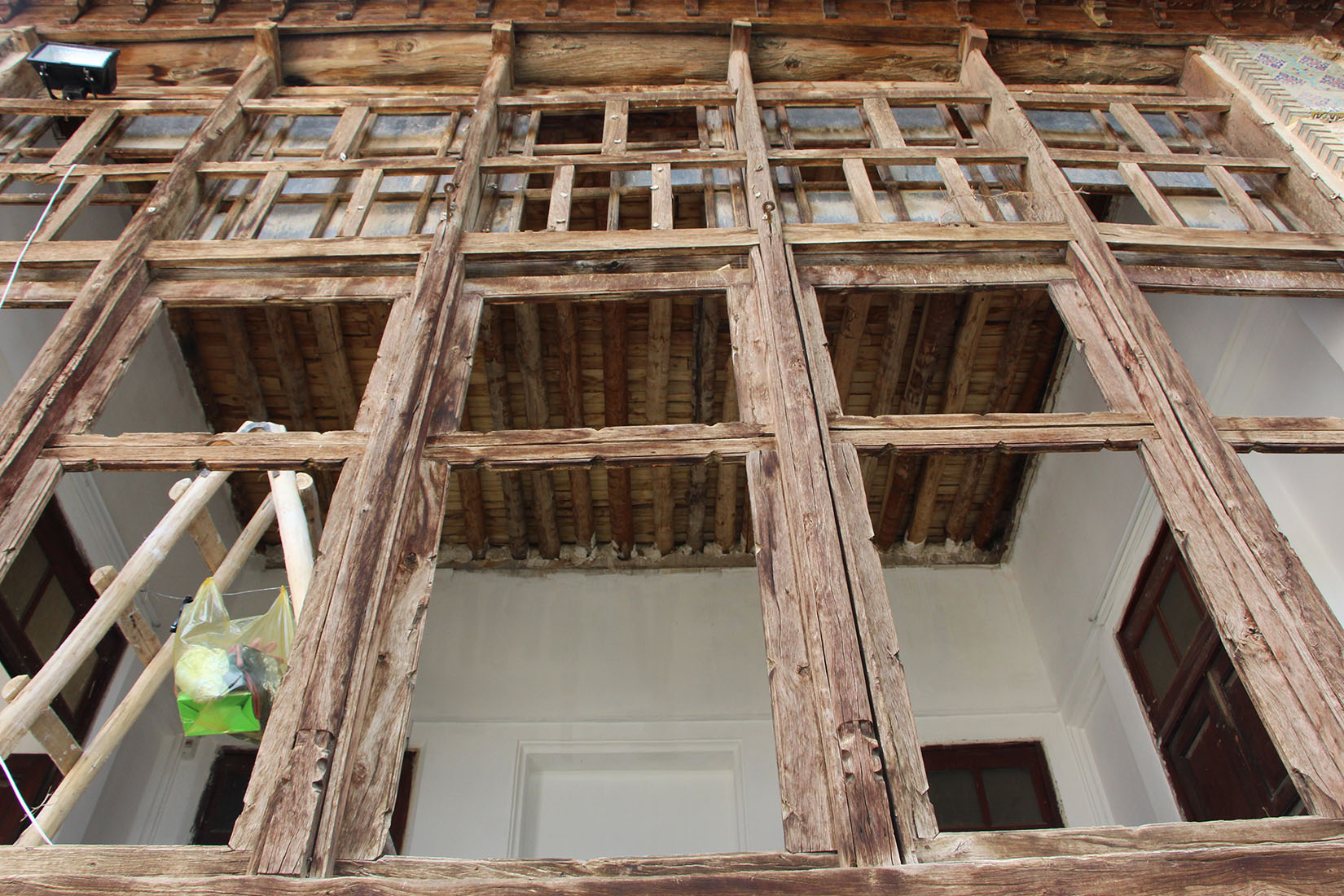

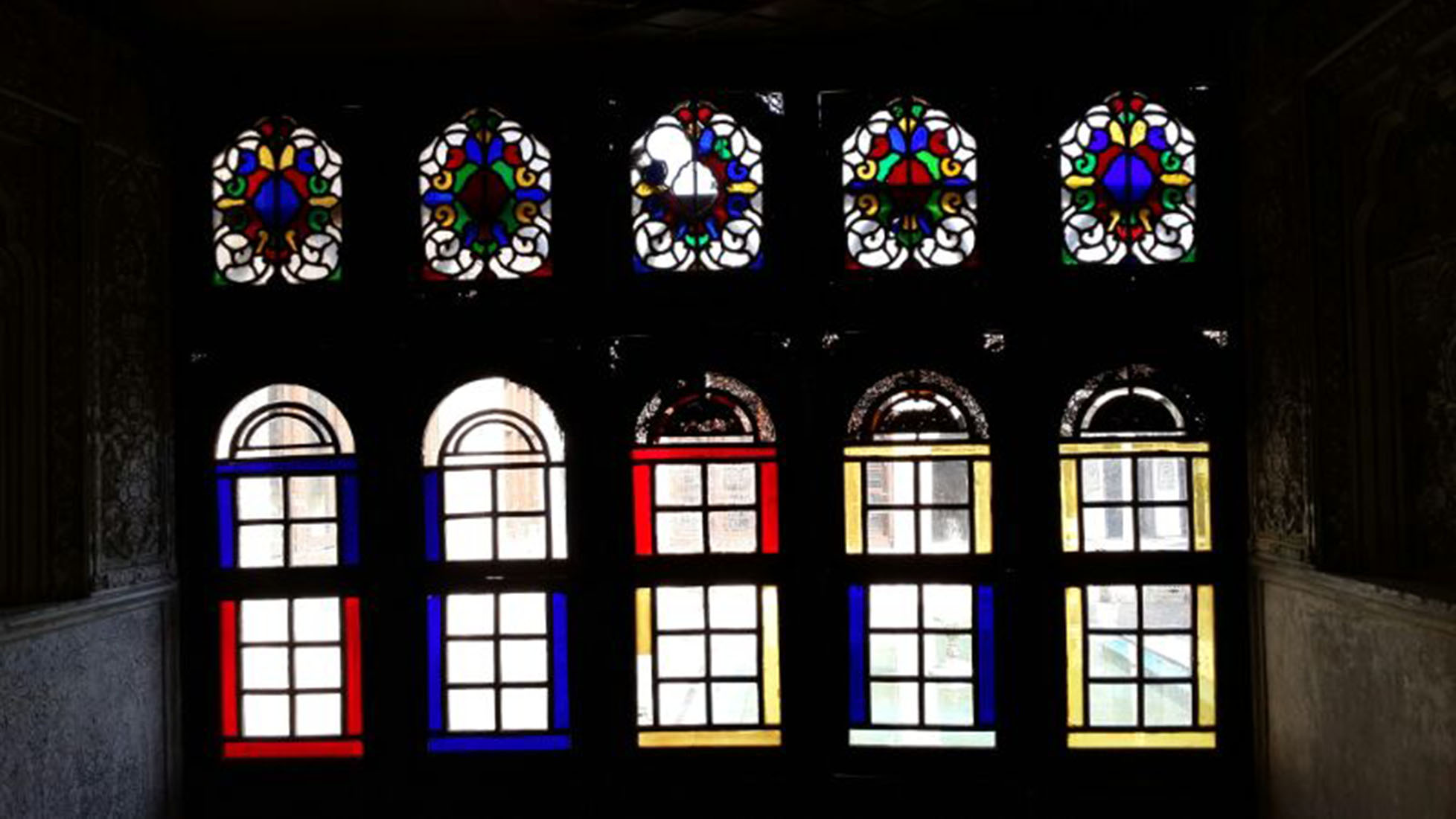

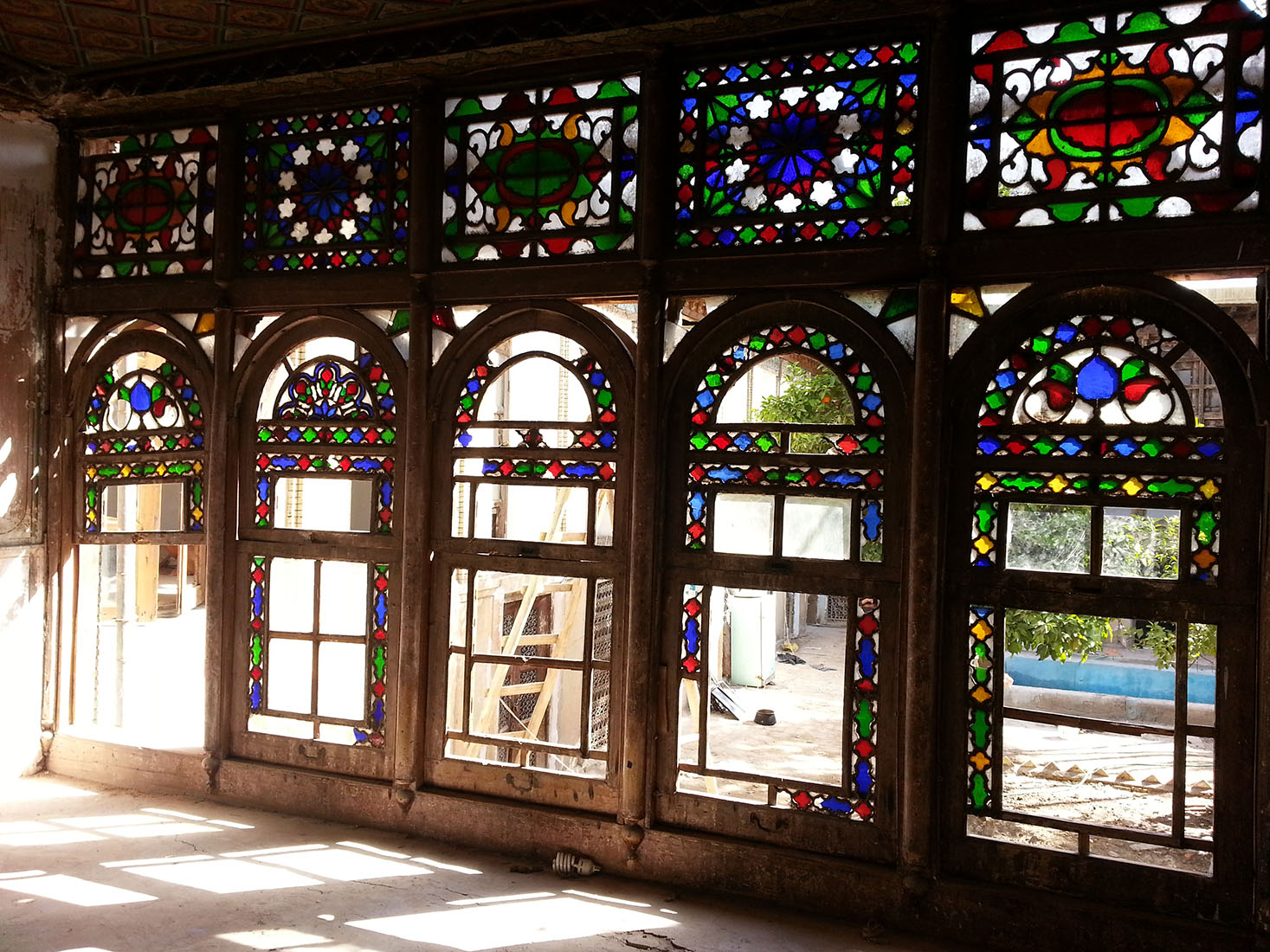
