= Garu, South Khorasan =

Village in South Khorasan province, Iran

Garu Persian: گرو
- Village
- Location within Iran
- Country: Iran
- Province: South Khorasan
- County: Nehbandan
- District: Sardaran
- Rural District: Seyedal

Population (2016)
  - Total: 71
- Time zone: UTC+3:30 (IRST)

Garu (Persian: گرو) (Note: Also romanized as Garow and Garū) is a village in Seyedal Rural District of Sardaran District in Nehbandan County, South Khorasan province, Iran.

== Demographics ==
=== Population ===
At the time of the 2006 National Census, the village's population was 60 in 23 households, when it was in Arabkhaneh Rural District of Shusef District. The following census in 2011 counted 76 people in 30 households. The 2016 census measured the population of the village as 71 people in 25 households.

In 2020, the rural district was separated from the district in the formation of Sardaran District, and Garu was transferred to Seyedal Rural District created in the new district.
