= Barak, South Khorasan =

Village in South Khorasan province, Iran

Barak Persian: برك
- Village
- Location within Iran
- Coordinates: 32°04′24″N 59°25′27″E
- Country: Iran
- Province: South Khorasan
- County: Nehbandan
- District: Sardaran
- Rural District: Seyedal

Population (2016)
  - Total: 193
- Time zone: UTC+3:30 (IRST)

Barak (Persian: برك) (Note: Also known Barag, Barak-e Bālā, and Barg) is a village in Seyedal Rural District of Sardaran District in Nehbandan County, South Khorasan province, Iran.

== Etymology ==
"Barak" as defined in the Moein dictionary:

- 1- Barak: Sohail star
- 2- Barak:
  - 2-1- The type of thick stuff that is knitted from camel or goat's hair in the Khorasan zone.
  - 2-2- A part of a carpet.
  - 2-3- The short clothing that is made by the Gailan people.

== History ==
It is not clearly a ruin of Barak village, but Christian cemeteries were caused to be around villages. Barak's history goes back about 400 years.

== Demographics ==
=== Population ===
At the time of the 2006 National Census, the village's population was 305 in 102 households, when it was in Arabkhaneh Rural District of Shusef District. The following census in 2011 counted 175 people in 57 households. The 2016 census measured the population of the village as 193 people in 66 households.

In 2020, the rural district was separated from the district in the formation of Sardaran District, and Barak was transferred to Seyedal Rural District created in the new district.

== Geography ==
=== Location ===
Barak village is about 125 km southwest of the city of Birjand and 95 km of northwest of the city of Nehbandan. This village is closed in by Siyah Kamar Mountain from the southwestern side, Barak Mountain from the north side and Gel Kan Mountain from the east side.

=== Climate ===
The weather of Barak is warm and dry climate. Spring season is verdant and beautiful, causing growth of pasture, plants, and grass. Also, summer season is hot! Air temperature is up to 35 degrees °C in the later days of summer, and there is dust on half of the weekdays at least. Air temperature at night fluctuates between 15 and 20 °C. However, autumn season gives cold and dry weather to Barak people, but winter is very cold and rainfall is very little.
