= Khosrowabad, Nehbandan =

Village in South Khorasan province, Iran

Khosrowabad Persian: خسرواباد
- Village
- Location within Iran
- Coordinates: 32°03′12″N 59°41′54″E
- Country: Iran
- Province: South Khorasan
- County: Nehbandan
- District: Sardaran
- Rural District: Seyedal

Population (2016)
  - Total: 68
- Time zone: UTC+3:30 (IRST)

Khosrowabad (Persian: خسرواباد) (Note: Also romanized as Khosrowābād; also known as Kalāteh Khusrābād) is a village in Seyedal Rural District of Sardaran District in Nehbandan County, South Khorasan province, Iran.

== Demographics ==
=== Population ===
At the time of the 2006 National Census, the village's population was 98 in 29 households, when it was in Arabkhaneh Rural District of Shusef District. The following census in 2011 counted 88 people in 27 households. The 2016 census measured the population of the village as 68 people in 26 households.

In 2020, the rural district was separated from the district in the formation of Sardaran District, and Khosrowabad was transferred to Seyedal Rural District created in the new district.
