= Tighdar-e Olya =

Village in South Khorasan province, Iran

Tighdar-e Olya Persian: تيغدرعليا
- Village
- Location within Iran
- Coordinates: 32°08′47″N 59°45′30″E
- Country: Iran
- Province: South Khorasan
- County: Nehbandan
- District: Sardaran
- Rural District: Sahlabad

Population (2016)
  - Total: 76
- Time zone: UTC+3:30 (IRST)

Tighdar-e Olya (Persian: تيغدرعليا) (Note: Also romanized as Tīghdar-e ‘Olyā; also known as Tīghdar) is a village in Sahlabad Rural District of Sardaran District in Nehbandan County, South Khorasan province, Iran.

== Demographics ==
=== Population ===
At the time of the 2006 National Census, the village's population was 134 in 35 households, when it was in Arabkhaneh Rural District of Shusef District. The following census in 2011 counted 56 people in 19 households. The 2016 census measured the population of the village as 76 people in 26 households.

In 2020, the rural district was separated from the district in the formation of Sardaran District, and Tighdar-e Olya was transferred to Sahlabad Rural District created in the new district.
