= Deh Sheykh, South Khorasan =

Village in South Khorasan province, Iran

Deh Sheykh Persian: ده شيخ
- Village
- Location within Iran
- Country: Iran
- Province: South Khorasan
- County: Nehbandan
- District: Sardaran
- Rural District: Seyedal

Population (2016)
  - Total: 23
- Time zone: UTC+3:30 (IRST)

Deh Sheykh (Persian: ده شيخ) (Note: Also romanized as Deh-e Sheykh; also known as Deh Shaikh) is a village in Seyedal Rural District of Sardaran District in Nehbandan County, South Khorasan province, Iran.

== Demographics ==
=== Population ===
At the time of the 2006 National Census, the village's population was 45 in 12 households, when it was in Arabkhaneh Rural District of Shusef District. The following census in 2011 counted 40 people in 10 households. The 2016 census measured the population of the village as 23 people in eight households.

In 2020, the rural district was separated from the district in the formation of Sardaran District, and Deh Sheykh was transferred to Seyedal Rural District created in the new district.
