= Manganeh-ye Ay =

Village in South Khorasan province, Iran

Manganeh-ye Ay Persian: منگنه اي
- Village
- Location within Iran
- Country: Iran
- Province: South Khorasan
- County: Nehbandan
- District: Sardaran
- Rural District: Seyedal

Population (2016)
  - Total: 42
- Time zone: UTC+3:30 (IRST)

Manganeh-ye Ay (Persian: منگنه اي) (Note: Also known as Kūchūleh Mangīneh’ī, Mangi Navi, Manginehi, Mangīneh’ī, Mangīngī, and Manjī Navī) is a village in Seyedal Rural District of Sardaran District in Nehbandan County, South Khorasan province, Iran.

== Demographics ==
=== Population ===
At the time of the 2006 National Census, the village's population was 66 in 21 households, when it was in Arabkhaneh Rural District of Shusef District. The following census in 2011 counted 33 people in 10 households. The 2016 census measured the population of the village as 42 people in 15 households.

In 2020, the rural district was separated from the district in the formation of Sardaran District, and Manganeh-ye Ay was transferred to Seyedal Rural District created in the new district.
