= Pustin =

Village in South Khorasan province, Iran

Pustin Persian: پوستين
- Village
- Location within Iran
- Coordinates: 32°04′17″N 59°22′17″E
- Country: Iran
- Province: South Khorasan
- County: Nehbandan
- District: Sardaran
- Rural District: Seyedal

Population (2016)
  - Total: 58
- Time zone: UTC+3:30 (IRST)

Pustin (Persian: پوستين) (Note: Also romanized as Pūstīn; also known as Pūstīn-e Bālā, Pūstīn Pa‘īn, and Pustīn-e Pā’īn) is a village in Seyedal Rural District of Sardaran District in Nehbandan County, South Khorasan province, Iran.

== Demographics ==
=== Population ===
At the time of the 2006 National Census, the village's population was 46 in nine households, when it was in Arabkhaneh Rural District of Shusef District. The following census in 2011 counted 10 people in seven households. The 2016 census measured the population of the village as 58 people in 16 households.

In 2020, the rural district was separated from the district in the formation of Sardaran District, and Pustin was transferred to Seyedal Rural District created in the new district.
