= Hasanabad-e Korq-e Sang =

Village in South Khorasan province, Iran

Hasanabad-e Korq-e Sang Persian: حسن ابادكرق سنگ
- Village
- Location within Iran
- Coordinates: 32°07′13″N 59°33′45″E
- Country: Iran
- Province: South Khorasan
- County: Nehbandan
- District: Sardaran
- Rural District: Seyedal

Population (2016)
  - Total: 118
- Time zone: UTC+3:30 (IRST)

Hasanabad-e Korq-e Sang (Persian: حسن ابادكرق سنگ) (Note: Also romanized as Ḩasanābād-e Korq-e Sang; also known as Hasanābād, Ḩasanābād Korokh Sang, Ḩasanābād Koroq Sang, Hoseynābād, and Kurg Sang) is a village in Seyedal Rural District of Sardaran District in Nehbandan County, South Khorasan province, Iran.

== Demographics ==
=== Population ===
At the time of the 2006 National Census, the village's population was 93 in 29 households, when it was in Arabkhaneh Rural District of Shusef District. The following census in 2011 counted 168 people in 50 households. The 2016 census measured the population of the village as 118 people in 40 households.

In 2020, the rural district was separated from the district in the formation of Sardaran District, and Hasanabad-e Korq-e Sang was transferred to Seyedal Rural District created in the new district.
