= Duzangan =

Village in South Khorasan province, Iran

Duzangan Persian: دوزنگان
- Village
- Location within Iran
- Coordinates: 32°07′31″N 59°39′18″E
- Country: Iran
- Province: South Khorasan
- County: Nehbandan
- District: Sardaran
- Rural District: Sahlabad

Population (2016)
  - Total: Below reporting threshold
- Time zone: UTC+3:30 (IRST)

Duzangan (Persian: دوزنگان) (Note: Also romanized as Doozangan and Dūzangān; also known as Dozānghān, Dūzīgān, and Kalāteh Dūzangun) is a village in Sahlabad Rural District of Sardaran District in Nehbandan County, South Khorasan province, Iran.

== Demographics ==
=== Population ===
At the time of the 2006 National Census, the village's population was 23 in six households, when it was in Arabkhaneh Rural District of Shusef District. The following census in 2011 counted 13 people in four households. The 2016 census measured the population of the village as below the reporting threshold.

In 2020, the rural district was separated from the district in the formation of Sardaran District, and Duzangan was transferred to Sahlabad Rural District created in the new district.
