= Kalateh-ye Now, Seyedal =

Village in South Khorasan province, Iran

Kalateh-ye Now Persian: كلاته نو
- Village
- Location within Iran
- Coordinates: 32°06′01″N 59°40′52″E
- Country: Iran
- Province: South Khorasan
- County: Nehbandan
- District: Sardaran
- Rural District: Seyedal

Population (2016)
  - Total: 78
- Time zone: UTC+3:30 (IRST)

Kalateh-ye Now (Persian: كلاته نو) (Note: Also romanized as Kalāteh Now and Kalāteh-ye Now; also known as Kalāt-e Now (كلات نو), Kalāteh Miyānrūd, Kalāteh-ye Mīān Rūd, Mīān Rūd, and Miyan Rood) is a village in Seyedal Rural District of Sardaran District in Nehbandan County, South Khorasan province, Iran.

== Demographics ==
=== Population ===
At the time of the 2006 National Census, the village's population was 91 in 23 households, when it was in Arabkhaneh Rural District of Shusef District. The following census in 2011 counted 96 people in 24 households. The 2016 census measured the population of the village as 78 people in 24 households.

In 2020, the rural district was separated from the district in the formation of Sardaran District, and Kalateh-ye Now was transferred to Seyedal Rural District created in the new district.
