= Mirabad, Nehbandan =

Village in South Khorasan province, Iran

Mirabad Persian: ميراباد
- Village
- Location within Iran
- Country: Iran
- Province: South Khorasan
- County: Nehbandan
- District: Sardaran
- Rural District: Seyedal

Population (2016)
  - Total: 13
- Time zone: UTC+3:30 (IRST)

Mirabad (Persian: ميراباد) (Note: Also romanized as Mīrābād; also known as Kalāteh Mīrābād and Kalāteh-ye Mīrābād) is a village in Seyedal Rural District of Sardaran District in Nehbandan County, South Khorasan province, Iran.

== Demographics ==
=== Population ===
At the time of the 2006 National Census, the village's population was 27 in seven households, when it was in Arabkhaneh Rural District of Shusef District. The following census in 2011 counted 35 people in 12 households. The 2016 census measured the population of the village as 13 people in five households.

In 2020, the rural district was separated from the district in the formation of Sardaran District, and Mirabad was transferred to Seyedal Rural District created in the new district.
