= Tutesk =

Village in South Khorasan province, Iran

Tutesk Persian: توتسك
- Village
- Location within Iran
- Coordinates: 32°08′53″N 59°42′15″E
- Country: Iran
- Province: South Khorasan
- County: Nehbandan
- District: Sardaran
- Rural District: Sahlabad

Population (2016)
  - Total: 98
- Time zone: UTC+3:30 (IRST)

Tutesk (Persian: توتسك) (Note: Also romanized as Tūtesk and Tutsak; also known as Tūtisk) is a village in Sahlabad Rural District of Sardaran District in Nehbandan County, South Khorasan province, Iran.

== Demographics ==
=== Population ===
At the time of the 2006 National Census, the village's population was 148 in 43 households, when it was in Arabkhaneh Rural District of Shusef District. The following census in 2011 counted 88 people in 33 households. The 2016 census measured the population of the village as 98 people in 35 households.

In 2020, the rural district was separated from the district in the formation of Sardaran District, and Tutesk was transferred to Sahlabad Rural District created in the new district.
