= Semani-ye Sofla =

Village in South Khorasan province, Iran

Semani-ye Sofla Persian: سمني سفلي
- Village
- Location within Iran
- Country: Iran
- Province: South Khorasan
- County: Nehbandan
- District: Sardaran
- Rural District: Seyedal

Population (2016)
  - Total: 55
- Time zone: UTC+3:30 (IRST)

Semani-ye Sofla (Persian: سمني سفلي) (Note: Also romanized as Semanī-ye Soflá; also known as Semanī-ye Paeen) is a village in Seyedal Rural District of Sardaran District in Nehbandan County, South Khorasan province, Iran.

== Demographics ==
=== Population ===
At the time of the 2006 National Census, the village's population was 75 in 22 households, when it was in Arabkhaneh Rural District of Shusef District. The following census in 2011 counted 67 people in 23 households. The 2016 census measured the population of the village as 55 people in 17 households.

In 2020, the rural district was separated from the district in the formation of Sardaran District, and Semani-ye Sofla was transferred to Seyedal Rural District created in the new district.
