= Mahalabad-e Sofla =

Village in South Khorasan province, Iran

Mahalabad-e Sofla Persian: مهل ابادسفلي
- Village
- Location within Iran
- Country: Iran
- Province: South Khorasan
- County: Nehbandan
- District: Sardaran
- Rural District: Seyedal

Population (2016)
  - Total: 197
- Time zone: UTC+3:30 (IRST)

Mahalabad-e Sofla (Persian: مهل ابادسفلي) (Note: Also romanized as Maḩalābād-e Soflá; also known as Maḩalābād-e Pā’īn) is a village in Seyedal Rural District of Sardaran District in Nehbandan County, South Khorasan province, Iran.

== Demographics ==
=== Population ===
At the time of the 2006 National Census, the village's population was 210 in 56 households, when it was in Arabkhaneh Rural District of Shusef District. The following census in 2011 counted 251 people in 76 households. The 2016 census measured the population of the village as 197 people in 60 households.

In 2020, the rural district was separated from the district in the formation of Sardaran District, and Mahalabad-e Sofla was transferred to Seyedal Rural District created in the new district.
