= Soltani-ye Olya =

Village in South Khorasan province, Iran

Soltani-ye Olya Persian: سلطاني عليا
- Village
- Location within Iran
- Coordinates: 32°04′08″N 59°29′11″E
- Country: Iran
- Province: South Khorasan
- County: Nehbandan
- District: Sardaran
- Rural District: Seyedal

Population (2016)
  - Total: 98
- Time zone: UTC+3:30 (IRST)

Soltani-ye Olya (Persian: سلطاني عليا) (Note: Also romanized as Soltani Olya, Solţānī ‘Olyā, and Solţānī-ye ‘Olyā; also known as Solţānī and Sutuni) is a village in Seyedal Rural District of Sardaran District in Nehbandan County, South Khorasan province, Iran.

== Demographics ==
=== Population ===
At the time of the 2006 National Census, the village's population was 137 in 44 households, when it was in Arabkhaneh Rural District of Shusef District. The following census in 2011 counted 101 people in 31 households. The 2016 census measured the population of the village as 98 people in 31 households.

In 2020, the rural district was separated from the district in the formation of Sardaran District, and Soltani-ye Olya was transferred to Seyedal Rural District created in the new district.
