= Khunikak =

Village in South Khorasan province, Iran

Khunikak Persian: خونيكك
- Village
- Location within Iran
- Country: Iran
- Province: South Khorasan
- County: Nehbandan
- District: Sardaran
- Rural District: Seyedal

Population (2016)
  - Total: 16
- Time zone: UTC+3:30 (IRST)

Khunikak (Persian: خونيكك) (Note: Also romanized as Khūnīkak; also known as Kalāteh Khūnīk, Kalāteh-ye Khūnīk, Khonik, Khosrowābād Bālā, and Khūnīk) is a village in Seyedal Rural District of Sardaran District in Nehbandan County, South Khorasan province, Iran.

== Demographics ==
=== Population ===
At the time of the 2006 National Census, the village's population was 49 in 12 households, when it was in Arabkhaneh Rural District of Shusef District. The following census in 2011 counted 42 people in 14 households. The 2016 census measured the population of the village as 16 people in six households.

In 2020, the rural district was separated from the district in the formation of Sardaran District, and Khunikak was transferred to Seyedal Rural District created in the new district.
