= Yazdan Chah =

Village in South Khorasan province, Iran

Yazdan Chah Persian: يزدان چاه
- Village
- Location within Iran
- Country: Iran
- Province: South Khorasan
- County: Nehbandan
- District: Sardaran
- Rural District: Seyedal

Population (2016)
  - Total: Below reporting threshold
- Time zone: UTC+3:30 (IRST)

Yazdan Chah (Persian: يزدان چاه) (Note: Also romanized as Yazdān Chāh; also known as Gaz Deh) is a village in Seyedal Rural District of Sardaran District in Nehbandan County, South Khorasan province, Iran.

== Demographics ==
=== Population ===
At the time of the 2006 National Census, the village's population was 38 in seven households, when it was in Arabkhaneh Rural District of Shusef District. The following censuses in 2011 and 2016 counted a population below the reporting threshold.

In 2020, the rural district was separated from the district in the formation of Sardaran District, and Yazdan Chah was transferred to Seyedal Rural District created in the new district.
