= Shir Shotor, South Khorasan =

Village in South Khorasan province, Iran

Shir Shotor Persian: شيرشتر
- Village
- Location within Iran
- Coordinates: 32°13′21″N 59°56′04″E
- Country: Iran
- Province: South Khorasan
- County: Nehbandan
- District: Sardaran
- Rural District: Sahlabad

Population (2016)
  - Total: 111
- Time zone: UTC+3:30 (IRST)

Shir Shotor (Persian: شيرشتر) (Note: Also romanized as Shīr Shotor; also known as Shīr Shutur) is a village in Sahlabad Rural District of Sardaran District in Nehbandan County, South Khorasan province, Iran.

== Demographics ==
=== Population ===
At the time of the 2006 National Census, the village's population was 93 in 26 households, when it was in Shusef Rural District of Shusef District. The following census in 2011 counted 157 people in 50 households. The 2016 census measured the population of the village as 111 people in 38 households.

In 2020, Shir Shotor was separated from the district in the formation of Sardaran District and transferred to Sahlabad Rural District created in the new district.
