= Khorrami =

Village in South Khorasan province, Iran

Khorrami Persian: خرمی
- Village
- Location within Iran
- Country: Iran
- Province: South Khorasan
- County: Nehbandan
- District: Sardaran
- Rural District: Arabkhaneh

Population (2016)
  - Total: 33
- Time zone: UTC+3:30 (IRST)

Khorrami (Persian: خرمی) (Note: Also romanized as Khorramī; also known as Khurami) is a village in Arabkhaneh Rural District of Sardaran District in Nehbandan County, South Khorasan province, Iran.

== Demographics ==
=== Population ===
At the time of the 2006 National Census, the village's population was 53 in 18 households, when it was in Shusef District. The following census in 2011 counted 41 people in 15 households. The 2016 census measured the population of the village as 33 people in 13 households.

In 2020, the rural district was separated from the district in the formation of Sardaran District.
