= Estakhrak, South Khorasan =

Village in South Khorasan province, Iran

Estakhrak Persian: استخرك
- Village
- Location within Iran
- Coordinates: 32°14′40″N 59°24′41″E
- Country: Iran
- Province: South Khorasan
- County: Nehbandan
- District: Sardaran
- Rural District: Arabkhaneh

Population (2016)
  - Total: 53
- Time zone: UTC+3:30 (IRST)

Estakhrak (Persian: استخرك) is a village in Arabkhaneh Rural District of Sardaran District in Nehbandan County, South Khorasan province, Iran.

== Demographics ==
=== Population ===
At the time of the 2006 National Census, the village's population was 62 in 14 households, when it was in Shusef District. The following census in 2011 counted 65 people in 20 households. The 2016 census measured the population of the village as 53 people in 18 households.

In 2020, the rural district was separated from the district in the formation of Sardaran District.
