= Chah Kord =

Village in South Khorasan province, Iran

Chah Kord Persian: چاه كرد
- Village
- Location within Iran
- Coordinates: 32°14′54″N 59°36′52″E
- Country: Iran
- Province: South Khorasan
- County: Nehbandan
- District: Sardaran
- Rural District: Arabkhaneh

Population (2016)
  - Total: Below reporting threshold
- Time zone: UTC+3:30 (IRST)

Chah Kord (Persian: چاه كرد) (Note: Also romanized as Chāh Kord) is a village in Arabkhaneh Rural District of Sardaran District in Nehbandan County, South Khorasan province, Iran.

== Demographics ==
=== Population ===
At the time of the 2006 National Census, the village's population was 58 in 14 households, when it was in Shusef District. The following census in 2011 counted 28 people in 10 households. The 2016 census measured the population of the village as below the reporting threshold.

In 2020, the rural district was separated from the district in the formation of Sardaran District.
