= Ebrahimi, South Khorasan =

Village in South Khorasan province, Iran

Ebrahimi Persian: ابراهيمي
- Village
- Location within Iran
- Coordinates: 32°17′05″N 59°44′24″E
- Country: Iran
- Province: South Khorasan
- County: Nehbandan
- District: Sardaran
- Rural District: Sahlabad

Population (2016)
  - Total: 173
- Time zone: UTC+3:30 (IRST)

Ebrahimi (Persian: ابراهيمي) (Note: Also romanized as Ebrāhīmī and Ibrāhīmi; also known as Ebrāhīmābād) is a village in Sahlabad Rural District of Sardaran District in Nehbandan County, South Khorasan province, Iran.

== Demographics ==
=== Population ===
At the time of the 2006 National Census, the village's population was 109 in 29 households, when it was in Shusef Rural District of Shusef District. The following census in 2011 counted 201 people in 63 households. The 2016 census measured the population of the village as 173 people in 51 households.

In 2020, Ebrahimi was separated from the district in the formation of Sardaran District and transferred to Sahlabad Rural District created in the new district.
