= Darudi, South Khorasan =

Village in South Khorasan province, Iran

Darudi Persian: درودی
- Village
- Location within Iran
- Coordinates: 32°11′02″N 59°32′20″E
- Country: Iran
- Province: South Khorasan
- County: Nehbandan
- District: Sardaran
- Rural District: Arabkhaneh

Population (2016)
  - Total: 11
- Time zone: UTC+3:30 (IRST)

Darudi (Persian: درودی) (Note: Also romanized as Darūdī; also known as Dow Rūdī) is a village in Arabkhaneh Rural District of Sardaran District in Nehbandan County, South Khorasan province, Iran.

== Demographics ==
=== Population ===
At the time of the 2006 National Census, the village's population was 12 in four households, when it was in Shusef District. The following census in 2011 counted 22 people in seven households. The 2016 census measured the population of the village as 11 people in five households.

In 2020, the rural district was separated from the district in the formation of Sardaran District.
