= Bicheh =

Village in South Khorasan province, Iran

Bicheh Persian: بيچه
- Village
- Location within Iran
- Coordinates: 32°07′48″N 60°06′00″E
- Country: Iran
- Province: South Khorasan
- County: Nehbandan
- District: Sardaran
- Rural District: Sahlabad

Population (2016)
  - Total: 0
- Time zone: UTC+3:30 (IRST)

Bicheh (Persian: بيچه) (Note: Also romanized as Bīcheh) is a village in Sahlabad Rural District of Sardaran District in Nehbandan County, South Khorasan province, Iran.

== Demographics ==
=== Population ===
At the time of the 2006 National Census, the village's population was 16 in five households, when it was in Shusef Rural District of Shusef District. The following census in 2011 counted 16 people in six households. The 2016 census measured the population of the village as zero.

In 2020, Seyyed Morad was separated from the district in the formation of Sardaran District and transferred to Sahlabad Rural District created in the new district.
