= Rud Darreh =

Village in South Khorasan province, Iran

Rud Darreh Persian: روددره
- Village
- Location within Iran
- Coordinates: 32°17′22″N 59°19′52″E
- Country: Iran
- Province: South Khorasan
- County: Nehbandan
- District: Sardaran
- Rural District: Arabkhaneh

Population (2016)
  - Total: 42
- Time zone: UTC+3:30 (IRST)

Rud Darreh (Persian: روددره) (Note: Also romanized as Rood Darreh, Rūd Darreh, and Rūd-e Darreh; also known as Rū Darreh and Ruidarreh) is a village in Arabkhaneh Rural District of Sardaran District in Nehbandan County, South Khorasan province, Iran.

== Demographics ==
=== Population ===
At the time of the 2006 National Census, the village's population was 88 in 23 households, when it was in Shusef District. The following census in 2011 counted 59 people in 20 households. The 2016 census measured the population of the village as 42 people in 13 households.

In 2020, the rural district was separated from the district in the formation of Sardaran District.
