= Firuzabad, Nehbandan =

Village in South Khorasan province, Iran

Firuzabad Persian: فيروزاباد
- Village
- Location within Iran
- Coordinates: 32°08′30″N 59°51′49″E
- Country: Iran
- Province: South Khorasan
- County: Nehbandan
- District: Sardaran
- Rural District: Sahlabad

Population (2016)
  - Total: 105
- Time zone: UTC+3:30 (IRST)

Firuzabad (Persian: فيروزاباد) (Note: Also romanized as Firooz Abad and Fīrūzābād; also known as Hājīābād) is a village in Sahlabad Rural District of Sardaran District in Nehbandan County, South Khorasan province, Iran.

== Demographics ==
=== Population ===
At the time of the 2006 National Census, the village's population was 103 in 32 households, when it was in Shusef Rural District of Shusef District. The following census in 2011 counted 103 people in 31 households. The 2016 census measured the population of the village as 105 people in 31 households.

In 2020, Firuzabad was separated from the district in the formation of Sardaran District and transferred to Sahlabad Rural District created in the new district.
