= Gazan, South Khorasan =

Village in South Khorasan province, Iran

Gazan Persian: گزان
- Village
- Location within Iran
- Coordinates: 32°12′18″N 59°30′10″E
- Country: Iran
- Province: South Khorasan
- County: Nehbandan
- District: Sardaran
- Rural District: Arabkhaneh

Population (2016)
  - Total: 41
- Time zone: UTC+3:30 (IRST)

Gazan (Persian: گزان) (Note: Also known as Ghāzān and Qāzān) is a village in Arabkhaneh Rural District of Sardaran District in Nehbandan County, South Khorasan province, Iran.

== Demographics ==
=== Population ===
At the time of the 2006 National Census, the village's population was 105 in 34 households, when it was in Shusef District. The following census in 2011 counted 64 people in 30 households. The 2016 census measured the population of the village as 41 people in 17 households.

In 2020, the rural district was separated from the district in the formation of Sardaran District.
