= Sulakhan =

Village in South Khorasan province, Iran

Sulakhan Persian: سولاخان
- Village
- Location within Iran
- Coordinates: 32°15′06″N 59°29′25″E
- Country: Iran
- Province: South Khorasan
- County: Nehbandan
- District: Sardaran
- Rural District: Arabkhaneh

Population (2016)
  - Total: 73
- Time zone: UTC+3:30 (IRST)

Sulakhan (Persian: سولاخان) (Note: Also romanized as Sūlākhān) is a village in Arabkhaneh Rural District of Sardaran District in Nehbandan County, South Khorasan province, Iran.

== Demographics ==
=== Population ===
At the time of the 2006 National Census, the village's population was 158 in 45 households, when it was in Shusef District. The following census in 2011 counted 161 people in 56 households. The 2016 census measured the population of the village as 73 people in 27 households.

In 2020, the rural district was separated from the district in the formation of Sardaran District.
