= Hashtugan =

Village in South Khorasan province, Iran

Hashtugan Persian: هشتوگان
- Village
- Location within Iran
- Coordinates: 32°16′43″N 59°26′42″E
- Country: Iran
- Province: South Khorasan
- County: Nehbandan
- District: Sardaran
- Rural District: Arabkhaneh

Population (2016)
  - Total: 82
- Time zone: UTC+3:30 (IRST)

Hashtugan (Persian: هشتوگان) (Note: Also romanized as Hashtūgān; also known as Malooghan, Malūghan, Malughau, and Malūqān) is a village in Arabkhaneh Rural District of Sardaran District in Nehbandan County, South Khorasan province, Iran.

== Demographics ==
=== Population ===
At the time of the 2006 National Census, the village's population was 83 in 20 households, when it was in Shusef District. The following census in 2011 counted 98 people in 36 households. The 2016 census measured the population of the village as 82 people in 29 households.

In 2020, the rural district was separated from the district in the formation of Sardaran District.
