= Burgan-e Pain =

Village in South Khorasan province, Iran

Burgan-e Pain Persian: بورگان پايين
- Village
- Location within Iran
- Country: Iran
- Province: South Khorasan
- County: Nehbandan
- District: Sardaran
- Rural District: Sahlabad

Population (2016)
  - Total: Below reporting threshold
- Time zone: UTC+3:30 (IRST)

Burgan-e Pain (Persian: بورگان پايين) (Note: Also romanized as Būrgān-e Pā’īn) is a village in Sahlabad Rural District of Sardaran District in Nehbandan County, South Khorasan province, Iran.

== Demographics ==
=== Population ===
At the time of the 2006 National Census, the village's population was 36 in nine households, when it was in Arabkhaneh Rural District of Shusef District. The following census in 2011 counted 25 people in nine households. The 2016 census measured the population of the village as below the reporting threshold.

In 2020, the rural district was separated from the district in the formation of Sardaran District, and Burgan-e Pain was transferred to Sahlabad Rural District created in the new district.
