= Shahrak-e Tareh Tajemi Sahlabad =

Village in South Khorasan province, Iran

Shahrak-e Tareh Tajemi Sahlabad Persian: شهرك طرح تجميع سهل آباد
- Village
- Country: Iran
- Province: South Khorasan
- County: Nehbandan
- District: Sardaran
- Rural District: Sahlabad

Population (2016)
  - Total: 225
- Time zone: UTC+3:30 (IRST)

Shahrak-e Tareh Tajemi Sahlabad (Persian: شهرك طرح تجميع سهل آباد) (Note: Also romanized as Shahraḵ-e Tareḥ Tajemīʿ Sahlābād) is a village in Sahlabad Rural District of Sardaran District in Nehbandan County, South Khorasan province, Iran.

== Demographics ==
=== Population ===
At the time of the 2006 National Census, the village's population was 83 in 24 households, when it was in Shusef Rural District of Shusef District. The following census in 2011 counted 174 people in 39 households. The 2016 census measured the population of the village as 225 people in 57 households.

In 2020, Shahrak-e Tareh Tajemi Sahlabad was separated from the district in the formation of Sardaran District and transferred to Sahlabad Rural District created in the new district.
