= Molowghan =

Village in South Khorasan province, Iran

Molowghan Persian: ملوغان
- Village
- Location within Iran
- Coordinates: 32°18′00″N 59°24′25″E
- Country: Iran
- Province: South Khorasan
- County: Nehbandan
- District: Sardaran
- Rural District: Arabkhaneh

Population (2016)
  - Total: 57
- Time zone: UTC+3:30 (IRST)

Molowghan (Persian: ملوغان) (Note: Also romanized as Molowghān; also known as Hashta Khān, Hashtoogan, Hashtūgān, and Molowqān) is a village in Arabkhaneh Rural District of Sardaran District in Nehbandan County, South Khorasan province, Iran.

== Demographics ==
=== Population ===
At the time of the 2006 National Census, the village's population was 77 in 23 households, when it was in Shusef District. The following census in 2011 counted 67 people in 24 households. The 2016 census measured the population of the village as 57 people in 19 households.

In 2020, the rural district was separated from the district in the formation of Sardaran District.
