= Senji-ye Olya =

Village in South Khorasan province, Iran

Senji-ye Olya Persian: سنجي عليا
- Village
- Location within Iran
- Country: Iran
- Province: South Khorasan
- County: Nehbandan
- District: Sardaran
- Rural District: Arabkhaneh

Population (2016)
  - Total: 44
- Time zone: UTC+3:30 (IRST)

Senji-ye Olya (Persian: سنجي عليا) (Note: Also romanized as Senjī-ye ‘Olyā; also known as Sanjī and Senjī) is a village in Arabkhaneh Rural District of Sardaran District in Nehbandan County, South Khorasan province, Iran.

== Demographics ==
=== Population ===
At the time of the 2006 National Census, the village's population was 62 in 20 households, when it was in Shusef District. The following census in 2011 counted 41 people in 13 households. The 2016 census measured the population of the village as 44 people in 16 households.

In 2020, the rural district was separated from the district in the formation of Sardaran District.
