= Dudu, South Khorasan =

Village in South Khorasan province, Iran

Dudu Persian: دودو
- Village
- Location within Iran
- Country: Iran
- Province: South Khorasan
- County: Nehbandan
- District: Sardaran
- Rural District: Sahlabad

Population (2016)
  - Total: Below reporting threshold
- Time zone: UTC+3:30 (IRST)

Dudu (Persian: دودو) (Note: Also romanized as Dūdū) is a village in Sahlabad Rural District of Sardaran District in Nehbandan County, South Khorasan province, Iran.

== Demographics ==
=== Population ===
At the time of the 2006 National Census, the village's population was 34 in six households, when it was in Shusef Rural District of Shusef District. The following censuses in 2011 and 2016 counted a population below the reporting threshold.

In 2020, Dudu was separated from the district in the formation of Sardaran District and transferred to Sahlabad Rural District created in the new district.
