= Burkan =

Burkan may refer to:

- Al-Burkan (The Volcano), a Libyan exile dissident group in the 1980s
- Burkan-e Bala, a village in South Khorasan Province, Iran
- Burkan-e Pain, a village in South Khorasan Province, Iran
- Nathan Burkan (1879–1936), Romanian-American lawyer
- Tolly Burkan (b. 1948), New Age speaker
- Volcano H-2 (also known as Burkan H-2), Yemeni ballistic missile
