= Cheshmeh Zard, Seyedal =

Village in South Khorasan province, Iran

Cheshmeh Zard Persian: چشمه زرد
- Village
- Location within Iran
- Coordinates: 32°04′25″N 59°22′31″E
- Country: Iran
- Province: South Khorasan
- County: Nehbandan
- District: Sardaran
- Rural District: Seyedal

Population (2016)
  - Total: 70
- Time zone: UTC+3:30 (IRST)

Cheshmeh Zard (Persian: چشمه زرد) is a village in Seyedal Rural District of Sardaran District in Nehbandan County, South Khorasan province, Iran.

== Demographics ==
=== Population ===
At the time of the 2006 National Census, the village's population was 59 in 19 households, when it was in Arabkhaneh Rural District of Shusef District. The following census in 2011 counted 146 people in 61 households. The 2016 census measured the population of the village as 70 people in 23 households.

In 2020, the rural district was separated from the district in the formation of Sardaran District, and Cheshmeh Zard was transferred to Seyedal Rural District created in the new district.
