= Harishi =

Village in South Khorasan province, Iran

Harishi Persian: هريشي
- Village
- Location within Iran
- Coordinates: 32°13′51″N 59°26′06″E
- Country: Iran
- Province: South Khorasan
- County: Nehbandan
- District: Sardaran
- Rural District: Arabkhaneh

Population (2016)
  - Total: 21
- Time zone: UTC+3:30 (IRST)

Harishi (Persian: هريشي) (Note: Also romanized as Harīshī; also known as Hūrshīn) is a village in Arabkhaneh Rural District of Sardaran District in Nehbandan County, South Khorasan province, Iran.

== Demographics ==
=== Population ===
At the time of the 2006 National Census, the village's population was 29 in 10 households, when it was in Shusef District. The following census in 2011 counted 27 people in 11 households. The 2016 census measured the population of the village as 21 people in nine households.

In 2020, the rural district was separated from the district in the formation of Sardaran District.
