= Darreh Kuran =

Village in South Khorasan province, Iran

Darreh Kuran Persian: دره كوران
- Village
- Location within Iran
- Country: Iran
- Province: South Khorasan
- County: Nehbandan
- District: Sardaran
- Rural District: Arabkhaneh

Population (2016)
  - Total: 30
- Time zone: UTC+3:30 (IRST)

Darreh Kuran (Persian: دره كوران) (Note: Also romanized as Darreh Kooran, Darreh Kūrān, and Darreh-ye Kūrān; also known as Darreh-i-Kurun) is a village in Arabkhaneh Rural District of Sardaran District in Nehbandan County, South Khorasan province, Iran.

== Demographics ==
=== Population ===
At the time of the 2006 National Census, the village's population was 91 in 23 households, when it was in Shusef District. The following census in 2011 counted 51 people in 14 households. The 2016 census measured the population of the village as 30 people in 11 households.

In 2020, the rural district was separated from the district in the formation of Sardaran District.
