= Kalcheh =

Village in South Khorasan province, Iran

Kalcheh Persian: كلچه
- Village
- Location within Iran
- Country: Iran
- Province: South Khorasan
- County: Nehbandan
- District: Sardaran
- Rural District: Sahlabad

Population (2016)
  - Total: 10
- Time zone: UTC+3:30 (IRST)

Kalcheh (Persian: كلچه) (Note: Also romanized as Kal Chāh; also known as Gol Chāh) is a village in Sahlabad Rural District of Sardaran District in Nehbandan County, South Khorasan province, Iran.

== Demographics ==
=== Population ===
At the time of the 2006 National Census, the village's population was 40 in 10 households, when it was in Shusef Rural District of Shusef District. The following census in 2011 counted 28 people in six households. The 2016 census measured the population of the village as 10 people in four households.

In 2020, Kalcheh was separated from the district in the formation of Sardaran District and transferred to Sahlabad Rural District created in the new district.
