= Sahlabad, South Khorasan =

Village in South Khorasan province, Iran

Sahlabad Persian: سهل اباد
- Village
- Location within Iran
- Coordinates: 32°10′26″N 59°51′18″E
- Country: Iran
- Province: South Khorasan
- County: Nehbandan
- District: Sardaran
- Rural District: Sahlabad

Population (2016)
  - Total: 187
- Time zone: UTC+3:30 (IRST)

Sahlabad (Persian: سهل اباد) (Note: Also romanized as Sahlābād and Sehlābād) is a village in, and the capital of, Sahlabad Rural District in Sardaran District of Nehbandan County, South Khorasan province, Iran.

== Demographics ==
=== Population ===
At the time of the 2006 National Census, the village's population was 305 in 85 households, when it was in Shusef Rural District of Shusef District. The following census in 2011 counted 257 people in 73 households. The 2016 census measured the population of the village as 187 people in 54 households.

In 2020, Sahlabad was separated from the district in the formation of Sardaran District and transferred to Sahlabad Rural District created in the new district.
