= Mazar-e Seyyed Ali =

Village in South Khorasan province, Iran

Mazar-e Seyyed Ali Persian: مزارسيدعلي
- Village
- Location within Iran
- Coordinates: 32°14′09″N 59°49′17″E
- Country: Iran
- Province: South Khorasan
- County: Nehbandan
- District: Sardaran
- Rural District: Sahlabad

Population (2016)
  - Total: 745
- Time zone: UTC+3:30 (IRST)

Mazar-e Seyyed Ali (Persian: مزارسيدعلي) (Note: Also romanized as Mazār-e Seyyed ‘Alī; also known as Emāmzādeh Seyyed ‘Alī, Zīārat-e Seyyed ‘Alī, and Ziyārat Saiyid ‘Ali) is a village in Sahlabad Rural District of Sardaran District in Nehbandan County, South Khorasan province, Iran.

== Demographics ==
=== Population ===
At the time of the 2006 National Census, the village's population was 215 in 67 households, when it was in Shusef Rural District of Shusef District. The following census in 2011 counted 628 people in 164 households. The 2016 census measured the population of the village as 745 people in 180 households, the most populous in its rural district.

In 2020, Mazar-e Seyyed Ali was separated from the district in the formation of Sardaran District and transferred to Sahlabad Rural District created in the new district.
