= Shurak, Sahlabad =

Village in South Khorasan province, Iran

Shurak Persian: شورك
- Village
- Location within Iran
- Coordinates: 32°07′24″N 60°02′14″E
- Country: Iran
- Province: South Khorasan
- County: Nehbandan
- District: Sardaran
- Rural District: Sahlabad

Population (2016)
  - Total: 25
- Time zone: UTC+3:30 (IRST)

Shurak (Persian: شورك) (Note: Also romanized as Shūraḵ) is a village in Sahlabad Rural District of Sardaran District in Nehbandan County, South Khorasan province, Iran.

== Demographics ==
=== Population ===
At the time of the 2006 National Census, the village's population was 47 in nine households, when it was in Shusef Rural District of Shusef District. The following census in 2011 counted 40 people in 11 households. The 2016 census measured the population of the village as 25 people in seven households.

In 2020, Shurak was separated from the district in the formation of Sardaran District and transferred to Sahlabad Rural District created in the new district.
