= Rezvan, South Khorasan =

Village in South Khorasan province, Iran

Rezvan Persian: رضوان
- Village
- Location within Iran
- Country: Iran
- Province: South Khorasan
- County: Nehbandan
- District: Sardaran
- Rural District: Arabkhaneh

Population (2016)
  - Total: 0
- Time zone: UTC+3:30 (IRST)

Rezvan (Persian: رضوان) (Note: Also romanized as Reẕvān) is a village in Arabkhaneh Rural District of Sardaran District in Nehbandan County, South Khorasan province, Iran.

== Demographics ==
=== Population ===
At the time of the 2006 National Census, the village's population was 15 in six households, when it was in Shusef District. The following census in 2011 counted a population below the reporting threshold. The 2016 census measured the population of the village as zero.

In 2020, the rural district was separated from the district in the formation of Sardaran District.
