= Kalateh-ye Kazemi =

Village in South Khorasan province, Iran

Kalateh-ye Kazemi Persian: كلاته كاظمي
- Village
- Country: Iran
- Province: South Khorasan
- County: Nehbandan
- District: Sardaran
- Rural District: Sahlabad

Population (2016)
  - Total: 0
- Time zone: UTC+3:30 (IRST)

Kalateh-ye Kazemi (Persian: كلاته كاظمي) (Note: Also romanized as Kalāteh-ye Kāẓemī) is a village in Sahlabad Rural District of Sardaran District in Nehbandan County, South Khorasan province, Iran.

== Demographics ==
=== Population ===
At the time of the 2006 National Census, the village's population was 69 in 11 households, when it was in Shusef Rural District of Shusef District. The village did not appear in the following census of 2011. The 2016 census measured the population of the village as zero.

In 2020, Kalateh-ye Kazemi was separated from the district in the formation of Sardaran District and transferred to Sahlabad Rural District created in the new district.
