= Garm Daru =

Village in South Khorasan province, Iran

Garm Daru Persian: گرمدارو
- Village
- Location within Iran
- Country: Iran
- Province: South Khorasan
- County: Nehbandan
- District: Sardaran
- Rural District: Sahlabad

Population (2016)
  - Total: Below reporting threshold
- Time zone: UTC+3:30 (IRST)

Garm Daru (Persian: گرمدارو) (Note: Also romanized as Garm Dārū) is a village in Sahlabad Rural District of Sardaran District in Nehbandan County, South Khorasan province, Iran.

== Demographics ==
=== Population ===
At the time of the 2006 National Census, the village's population was 37 in seven households, when it was in Shusef Rural District of Shusef District. The following census in 2011 counted 33 people in six households. The 2016 census measured the population of the village as below the reporting threshold.

In 2020, Garm Daru was separated from the district in the formation of Sardaran District and transferred to Sahlabad Rural District created in the new district.
