= Hoseynabad-e Arabkhaneh =

Village in South Khorasan province, Iran

Kalateh-ye Mazar Persian: حسين‌آباد عربخانه
- Village
- Location within Iran
- Country: Iran
- Province: South Khorasan
- County: Nehbandan
- District: Sardaran
- Rural District: Arabkhaneh

Population (2016)
  - Total: 0
- Time zone: UTC+3:30 (IRST)

Hoseynabad-e Arabkhaneh (Persian: حسين‌آباد عربخانه) (Note: Also romanized as Ḩoseynābād-e ‘Arabkhāneh) is a village in Arabkhaneh Rural District of Sardaran District in Nehbandan County, South Khorasan province, Iran.

== Demographics ==
=== Population ===
At the time of the 2006 National Census, the village's population was 11 in five households, when it was in Shusef District. The following census in 2011 counted 21 people in six households. The 2016 census measured the population of the village as zero.

In 2020, the rural district was separated from the district in the formation of Sardaran District.
