= Mansurabad, Nehbandan =

Village in South Khorasan province, Iran

Mansurabad Persian: منصوراباد
- Village
- Location within Iran
- Country: Iran
- Province: South Khorasan
- County: Nehbandan
- District: Sardaran
- Rural District: Arabkhaneh

Population (2016)
  - Total: 74
- Time zone: UTC+3:30 (IRST)

Mansurabad (Persian: منصوراباد) (Note: Also romanized as Manşūrābād) is a village in Arabkhaneh Rural District of Sardaran District in Nehbandan County, South Khorasan province, Iran.

== Demographics ==
=== Population ===
At the time of the 2006 National Census, the village's population was 82 in 24 households, when it was in Shusef District. The following census in 2011 counted 68 people in 22 households. The 2016 census measured the population of the village as 74 people in 21 households.

In 2020, the rural district was separated from the district in the formation of Sardaran District.
