= Gazidari-ye Olya =

Village in South Khorasan province, Iran

Gazidari-ye Olya Persian: گزيدري عليا
- Village
- Location within Iran
- Coordinates: 32°04′57″N 59°37′08″E
- Country: Iran
- Province: South Khorasan
- County: Nehbandan
- District: Sardaran
- Rural District: Seyedal

Population (2016)
  - Total: 16
- Time zone: UTC+3:30 (IRST)

Gazidari-ye Olya (Persian: گزيدري عليا) (Note: Also romanized as Gazīdarī-ye ‘Olyā; also known as Gazdari, Gazīdarī, Gazīdarī-ye Bālā, and Qazī Darī) is a village in Seyedal Rural District of Sardaran District in Nehbandan County, South Khorasan province, Iran.

== Demographics ==
=== Population ===
At the time of the 2006 National Census, the village's population was 39 in nine households, when it was in Arabkhaneh Rural District of Shusef District. The following census in 2011 counted 22 people in eight households. The 2016 census measured the population of the village as 16 people in five households.

In 2020, the rural district was separated from the district in the formation of Sardaran District, and Gazidari-ye Olya was transferred to Seyedal Rural District created in the new district.
