= Kasgan =

Village in South Khorasan province, Iran

Kasgan Persian: كاسگان
- Village
- Location within Iran
- Coordinates: 32°12′50″N 59°25′23″E
- Country: Iran
- Province: South Khorasan
- County: Nehbandan
- District: Sardaran
- Rural District: Arabkhaneh

Population (2016)
  - Total: Below reporting threshold
- Time zone: UTC+3:30 (IRST)

Kasgan (Persian: كاسگان) (Note: Also romanized as Kāsgān; also known as Gusāgān, Kāsahgān, Kāsehgān, Kāskān, and Kāskān-e Pā’īn (كاسكان پائين)) is a village in Arabkhaneh Rural District of Sardaran District in Nehbandan County, South Khorasan province, Iran.

== Demographics ==
=== Population ===
At the time of the 2006 National Census, the village's population was 13 in five households, when it was in Shusef District. The following census in 2011 counted 14 people in five households. The 2016 census measured the population of the village as below the reporting threshold.

In 2020, the rural district was separated from the district in the formation of Sardaran District.
