= Esmailabad, Nehbandan =

Village in South Khorasan province, Iran

Esmailabad Persian: اسماعيل اباد
- Village
- Location within Iran
- Coordinates: 32°03′20″N 59°48′54″E
- Country: Iran
- Province: South Khorasan
- County: Nehbandan
- District: Sardaran
- Rural District: Arabkhaneh

Population (2016)
  - Total: 263
- Time zone: UTC+3:30 (IRST)

Esmailabad (Persian: اسماعيل اباد) (Note: Also romanized as Esmā‘īlābād and Ismā‘īlābād; also known as Esma‘il Abad Behandan) is a village in Arabkhaneh Rural District of Sardaran District in Nehbandan County, South Khorasan province, Iran.

== Demographics ==
=== Population ===
At the time of the 2006 National Census, the village's population was 399 in 91 households, when it was in Shusef Rural District of Shusef District. The following census in 2011 counted 309 people in 82 households. The 2016 census measured the population of the village as 263 people in 74 households.

In 2020, Esmailabad was separated from the district in the formation of Sardaran District and transferred to Arabkhaneh Rural District in the new district.
