= Masudi, South Khorasan =

Village in South Khorasan province, Iran

Masudi Persian: مسعودي
- Village
- Location within Iran
- Country: Iran
- Province: South Khorasan
- County: Nehbandan
- District: Sardaran
- Rural District: Arabkhaneh

Population (2016)
  - Total: 14
- Time zone: UTC+3:30 (IRST)

Masudi (Persian: مسعودي) (Note: Also romanized as Mas‘oodi and Mas‘ūdī) is a village in Arabkhaneh Rural District of Sardaran District in Nehbandan County, South Khorasan province, Iran.

== Demographics ==
=== Population ===
At the time of the 2006 National Census, the village's population was 31 in nine households, when it was in Shusef District. The following census in 2011 counted 23 people in eight households. The 2016 census measured the population of the village as 14 people in four households.

In 2020, the rural district was separated from the district in the formation of Sardaran District.
