= Gandeshkan =

Village in South Khorasan province, Iran

Gandeshkan Persian: گندشكان
- Village
- Location within Iran
- Coordinates: 32°13′15″N 59°22′10″E
- Country: Iran
- Province: South Khorasan
- County: Nehbandan
- District: Sardaran
- Rural District: Arabkhaneh

Population (2016)
  - Total: Below reporting threshold
- Time zone: UTC+3:30 (IRST)

Gandeshkan (Persian: گندشكان) (Note: Also romanized as Gandeshkān; also known as Gandeshgān) is a village in Arabkhaneh Rural District of Sardaran District in Nehbandan County, South Khorasan province, Iran.

== Demographics ==
=== Population ===
At the time of the 2006 National Census, the village's population was 23 in six households, when it was in Shusef District. The following census in 2011 counted 22 people in seven households. The 2016 census measured the population of the village as below the reporting threshold.

In 2020, the rural district was separated from the district in the formation of Sardaran District.
