= Samak, South Khorasan =

Village in South Khorasan province, Iran

Samak Persian: سمك
- Village
- Location within Iran
- Coordinates: 32°03′30″N 59°31′17″E
- Country: Iran
- Province: South Khorasan
- County: Nehbandan
- District: Sardaran
- Rural District: Seyedal

Population (2016)
  - Total: 140
- Time zone: UTC+3:30 (IRST)

Samak (Persian: سمك) (Note: Also romanized as Samk; also known as Sanmak, Sīmak, and Simorgh) is a village in Seyedal Rural District of Sardaran District in Nehbandan County, South Khorasan province, Iran.

== Demographics ==
=== Population ===
At the time of the 2006 National Census, the village's population was 143 in 44 households, when it was in Arabkhaneh Rural District of Shusef District. The following census in 2011 counted 179 people in 52 households. The 2016 census measured the population of the village as 140 people in 47 households.

In 2020, the rural district was separated from the district in the formation of Sardaran District, and Samak was transferred to Seyedal Rural District created in the new district.
