= Sangan, South Khorasan =

Village in South Khorasan province, Iran

Sangan Persian: سنگان
- Village
- Location within Iran
- Coordinates: 32°11′30″N 59°29′13″E
- Country: Iran
- Province: South Khorasan
- County: Nehbandan
- District: Sardaran
- Rural District: Arabkhaneh

Population (2016)
  - Total: Below reporting threshold
- Time zone: UTC+3:30 (IRST)

Sangan (Persian: سنگان) (Note: Also romanized as Sangān; also known as Kalāteh-i-Amīri, Kalāteh-ye Amiri, and Sangān-e Pā’īn) is a village in Arabkhaneh Rural District of Sardaran District in Nehbandan County, South Khorasan province, Iran.

== Demographics ==
=== Population ===
At the time of the 2006 National Census, the village's population was 21 in five households, when it was in Shusef District. The following census in 2011 counted 29 people in 12 households. The 2016 census measured the population of the village as below the reporting threshold.

In 2020, the rural district was separated from the district in the formation of Sardaran District.
