= Hasanabad, Arabkhaneh =

Village in South Khorasan province, Iran

Hasanabad Persian: حسن اباد
- Village
- Location within Iran
- Coordinates: 32°12′04″N 59°33′37″E
- Country: Iran
- Province: South Khorasan
- County: Nehbandan
- District: Sardaran
- Rural District: Arabkhaneh

Population (2016)
  - Total: 20
- Time zone: UTC+3:30 (IRST)

Hasanabad (Persian: حسن اباد) (Note: Also romanized as Ḩasanābād) is a village in Arabkhaneh Rural District of Sardaran District in Nehbandan County, South Khorasan province, Iran.

== Demographics ==
=== Population ===
At the time of the 2006 National Census, the village's population was 45 in 14 households, when it was in Shusef District. The following census in 2011 counted 19 people in 10 households. The 2016 census measured the population of the village as 20 people in six households.

In 2020, the rural district was separated from the district in the formation of Sardaran District.
