= Zeynabad, Nehbandan =

Village in South Khorasan province, Iran

Zeynabad Persian: زين اباد
- Village
- Location within Iran
- Coordinates: 32°14′01″N 59°30′06″E
- Country: Iran
- Province: South Khorasan
- County: Nehbandan
- District: Sardaran
- Rural District: Arabkhaneh

Population (2016)
  - Total: Below reporting threshold
- Time zone: UTC+3:30 (IRST)

Zeynabad (Persian: زين اباد) (Note: Also romanized as Zein Abad and Zeynābād; also known as Zeynābād Sharqī and Zunābād) is a village in Arabkhaneh Rural District of Sardaran District in Nehbandan County, South Khorasan province, Iran.

== Demographics ==
=== Population ===
At the time of the 2006 National Census, the village's population was 14 in five households, when it was in Shusef District. The following census in 2011 counted 16 people in five households. The 2016 census measured the population of the village as below the reporting threshold.

In 2020, the rural district was separated from the district in the formation of Sardaran District.
