= Faratan =

Village in South Khorasan province, Iran

Faratan Persian: فراتان
- Village
- Location within Iran
- Coordinates: 32°17′36″N 59°22′17″E
- Country: Iran
- Province: South Khorasan
- County: Nehbandan
- District: Sardaran
- Rural District: Arabkhaneh

Population (2016)
  - Total: 66
- Time zone: UTC+3:30 (IRST)

Faratan (Persian: فراتان) (Note: Also romanized as Farātān and Ferātān; also known as Farāţūn) is a village in Arabkhaneh Rural District of Sardaran District in Nehbandan County, South Khorasan province, Iran.

== Demographics ==
=== Population ===
At the time of the 2006 National Census, the village's population was 148 in 39 households, when it was in Shusef District. The following census in 2011 counted 88 people in 36 households. The 2016 census measured the population of the village as 66 people in 25 households.

In 2020, the rural district was separated from the district in the formation of Sardaran District.
