= Kalateh-ye Aliabad, South Khorasan =

Village in South Khorasan province, Iran

Kalateh-ye Aliabad Persian: كلاته علي اباد
- Village
- Country: Iran
- Province: South Khorasan
- County: Nehbandan
- District: Sardaran
- Rural District: Arabkhaneh

Population (2016)
  - Total: Below reporting threshold
- Time zone: UTC+3:30 (IRST)

Kalateh-ye Aliabad (Persian: كلاته علي اباد) (Note: Also romanized as Kalāteh-ye ‘Alīābād; also known as ‘Alīābād and Kalāt-e ‘Alīābād (كلات علياباد)) is a village in Arabkhaneh Rural District of Sardaran District in Nehbandan County, South Khorasan province, Iran.

== Demographics ==
=== Population ===
At the time of the 2006 National Census, the village's population was 10 in four households, when it was in Shusef District. The following census in 2011 counted 17 people in six households. The 2016 census measured the population of the village as below the reporting threshold.

In 2020, the rural district was separated from the district in the formation of Sardaran District.
