= Eslamabad, Sardaran =

Village in South Khorasan province, Iran

Eslamabad Persian: اسلام اباد
- Village
- Location within Iran
- Coordinates: 32°12′19″N 59°24′58″E
- Country: Iran
- Province: South Khorasan
- County: Nehbandan
- District: Sardaran
- Rural District: Arabkhaneh

Population (2016)
  - Total: 46
- Time zone: UTC+3:30 (IRST)

Eslamabad (Persian: اسلام اباد) (Note: Also romanized as Eslāmābād; also known as Chāh Devānī, Shāh Darān (شاه دران), Shāh Darānī, Shāhderānī, and Shahdorānī) is a village in Arabkhaneh Rural District of Sardaran District in Nehbandan County, South Khorasan province, Iran.

== Demographics ==
=== Population ===
At the time of the 2006 National Census, the village's population was 35 in 10 households, when it was in Shusef District. The following census in 2011 counted 42 people in 20 households. The 2016 census measured the population of the village as 46 people in 16 households.

In 2020, the rural district was separated from the district in the formation of Sardaran District.
