= Kondor, Nehbandan =

Village in South Khorasan province, Iran

Kondor Persian: كندر
- Village
- Location within Iran
- Coordinates: 32°14′48″N 59°38′42″E
- Country: Iran
- Province: South Khorasan
- County: Nehbandan
- District: Sardaran
- Rural District: Arabkhaneh

Population (2016)
  - Total: Below reporting threshold
- Time zone: UTC+3:30 (IRST)

Kondor (Persian: كندر) (Note: Also romanized as Kondar; also known as Kundar) is a village in Arabkhaneh Rural District of Sardaran District in Nehbandan County, South Khorasan province, Iran.

== Demographics ==
=== Population ===
At the time of the 2006 National Census, the village's population was 67 in 21 households, when it was in Shusef District. The following census in 2011 counted 13 people in six households. The 2016 census measured the population of the village as below the reporting threshold.

In 2020, the rural district was separated from the district in the formation of Sardaran District.
