= Seyyed Morad, South Khorasan =

Village in South Khorasan province, Iran

Seyyed Morad Persian: سيدمراد
- Village
- Location within Iran
- Coordinates: 32°18′12″N 59°46′04″E
- Country: Iran
- Province: South Khorasan
- County: Nehbandan
- District: Sardaran
- Rural District: Sahlabad

Population (2016)
  - Total: 122
- Time zone: UTC+3:30 (IRST)

Seyyed Morad (Persian: سيدمراد) (Note: Also romanized as Seyyed Morād) is a village in Sahlabad Rural District of Sardaran District in Nehbandan County, South Khorasan province, Iran.

== Demographics ==
=== Population ===
At the time of the 2006 National Census, the village's population was 104 in 31 households, when it was in Shusef Rural District of Shusef District. The following census in 2011 counted 138 people in 40 households. The 2016 census measured the population of the village as 122 people in 40 households.

In 2020, Seyyed Morad was separated from the district in the formation of Sardaran District and transferred to Sahlabad Rural District created in the new district.
