= Omri, Iran =

Village in South Khorasan province, Iran

Omri Persian: عمري
- Village
- Location within Iran
- Coordinates: 32°17′23″N 59°20′48″E
- Country: Iran
- Province: South Khorasan
- County: Nehbandan
- District: Sardaran
- Rural District: Arabkhaneh

Population (2016)
  - Total: 42
- Time zone: UTC+3:30 (IRST)

Omri (Persian: عمري) (Note: Also romanized as ‘Omarī and ‘Omrī,; also known as ‘Umri) is a village in Arabkhaneh Rural District of Sardaran District in Nehbandan County, South Khorasan province, Iran.

== Demographics ==
=== Population ===
At the time of the 2006 National Census, the village's population was 57 in 15 households, when it was in Shusef District. The following census in 2011 counted 55 people in 18 households. The 2016 census measured the population of the village as 16 people in six households.

In 2020, the rural district was separated from the district in the formation of Sardaran District.
