= Soreykhan-e Sofla =

Village in South Khorasan province, Iran

Soreykhan-e Sofla Persian: سريخان سفلي
- Village
- Location within Iran
- Coordinates: 32°10′30″N 59°40′44″E
- Country: Iran
- Province: South Khorasan
- County: Nehbandan
- District: Sardaran
- Rural District: Arabkhaneh

Population (2016)
  - Total: 36
- Time zone: UTC+3:30 (IRST)

Soreykhan-e Sofla (Persian: سريخان سفلي) (Note: Also romanized as Soreykhān-e Soflá; also known as Kalāt-e Sarīkhān, Sarā-ye Khān, Sarīkhān, Sarkhūn, and Soreykhān) is a village in Arabkhaneh Rural District of Sardaran District in Nehbandan County, South Khorasan province, Iran.

== Demographics ==
=== Population ===
At the time of the 2006 National Census, the village's population was 134 in 43 households, when it was in Shusef District. The following census in 2011 counted 65 people in 26 households. The 2016 census measured the population of the village as 36 people in 19 households.

In 2020, the rural district was separated from the district in the formation of Sardaran District.
