= Kalateh-ye Ali Avaz =

Village in South Khorasan province, Iran

Kalateh-ye Ali Avaz Persian: كلاته علي عوض
- Village
- Location within Iran
- Coordinates: 32°12′30″N 59°40′39″E
- Country: Iran
- Province: South Khorasan
- County: Nehbandan
- District: Sardaran
- Rural District: Arabkhaneh

Population (2016)
  - Total: Below reporting threshold
- Time zone: UTC+3:30 (IRST)

Kalateh-ye Ali Avaz (Persian: كلاته علي عوض) (Note: Also romanized as Kalāteh ‘Alī Avaẕ and Kalāteh-ye ‘Alī Avaz; also known as ‘Alī ‘Avaz, ‘Ali Āwaz, and Kalāt-e ‘Alī ‘Avaẕ) is a village in Arabkhaneh Rural District of Sardaran District in Nehbandan County, South Khorasan province, Iran.

== Demographics ==
=== Population ===
At the time of the 2006 National Census, the village's population was 12 in four households, when it was in Shusef District. The following censuses in 2011 and 2016 counted a population below the reporting threshold.

In 2020, the rural district was separated from the district in the formation of Sardaran District.
