= Sayeh Sangan =

Village in South Khorasan province, Iran

Sayeh Sangan Persian: سايه سنگان
- Village
- Location within Iran
- Country: Iran
- Province: South Khorasan
- County: Nehbandan
- District: Sardaran
- Rural District: Arabkhaneh

Population (2016)
  - Total: 10
- Time zone: UTC+3:30 (IRST)

Sayeh Sangan (Persian: سايه سنگان) (Note: Also romanized as Sāyeh Sangān; also known as Seh Sangu, Seyāh Sangān, and Sīāh Sangān) is a village in Arabkhaneh Rural District of Sardaran District in Nehbandan County, South Khorasan province, Iran.

== Demographics ==
=== Population ===
At the time of the 2006 National Census, the village's population was 22 in seven households, when it was in Shusef District. The following census in 2011 counted 11 people in four households. The 2016 census measured the population of the village as 10 people in five households.

In 2020, the rural district was separated from the district in the formation of Sardaran District.
