= Toros Ab =

Village in South Khorasan province, Iran

Toros Ab Persian: ترس اب
- Village
- Location within Iran
- Country: Iran
- Province: South Khorasan
- County: Nehbandan
- District: Sardaran
- Rural District: Arabkhaneh

Population (2016)
  - Total: Below reporting threshold
- Time zone: UTC+3:30 (IRST)

Toros Ab (Persian: ترس اب) (Note: Also romanized as Toros Āb; also known as Torsh Āb and Turushāb) is a village in Arabkhaneh Rural District of Sardaran District in Nehbandan County, South Khorasan province, Iran.

== Demographics ==
=== Population ===
At the time of the 2006 National Census, the village's population was 26 in nine households, when it was in Shusef District. The following census in 2011 counted 20 people in seven households. The 2016 census measured the population of the village as below the reporting threshold.

In 2020, the rural district was separated from the district in the formation of Sardaran District.
