= Gazidari-ye Sofla =

Village in South Khorasan province, Iran

Gazidari-ye Sofla Persian: گزيدري سفلي
- Village
- Location within Iran
- Country: Iran
- Province: South Khorasan
- County: Nehbandan
- District: Sardaran
- Rural District: Seyedal

Population (2016)
  - Total: 19
- Time zone: UTC+3:30 (IRST)

Gazidari-ye Sofla (Persian: گزيدري سفلي) (Note: Also romanized as Gazīdarī-ye Soflá; also known as Gazīdarī-ye Pā’īn) is a village in Seyedal Rural District of Sardaran District in Nehbandan County, South Khorasan province, Iran.

== Demographics ==
=== Population ===
At the time of the 2006 National Census, the village's population was 32 in seven households, when it was in Arabkhaneh Rural District of Shusef District. The following census in 2011 counted 34 people in nine households. The 2016 census measured the population of the village as 19 people in eight households.

In 2020, the rural district was separated from the district in the formation of Sardaran District, and Gazidari-ye Sofla was transferred to Seyedal Rural District created in the new district.
