= Khosravi, Nehbandan =

Village in South Khorasan province, Iran

Khosravi Persian: خسروي
- Village
- Location within Iran
- Country: Iran
- Province: South Khorasan
- County: Nehbandan
- District: Sardaran
- Rural District: Arabkhaneh

Population (2016)
  - Total: 26
- Time zone: UTC+3:30 (IRST)

Khosravi (Persian: خسروي) (Note: Also romanized as Khosravī; also known as Khusrawi) is a village in Arabkhaneh Rural District of Sardaran District in Nehbandan County, South Khorasan province, Iran.

== Demographics ==
=== Population ===
At the time of the 2006 National Census, the village's population was 34 in 11 households, when it was in Shusef District. The following census in 2011 counted 28 people in 12 households. The 2016 census measured the population of the village as 26 people in 11 households.

In 2020, the rural district was separated from the district in the formation of Sardaran District.
