= Kalateh-ye Sarvar =

Village in South Khorasan province, Iran

Kalateh-ye Sarvar Persian: كلاته سرور
- Village
- Location within Iran
- Coordinates: 32°14′05″N 59°37′38″E
- Country: Iran
- Province: South Khorasan
- County: Nehbandan
- District: Sardaran
- Rural District: Arabkhaneh

Population (2016)
  - Total: 39
- Time zone: UTC+3:30 (IRST)

Kalateh-ye Sarvar (Persian: كلاته سرور) (Note: Also romanized as Kalāteh-ye Sarvar) is a village in Arabkhaneh Rural District of Sardaran District in Nehbandan County, South Khorasan province, Iran.

== Demographics ==
=== Population ===
At the time of the 2006 National Census, the village's population was 82 in 23 households, when it was in Shusef District. The following census in 2011 counted 89 people in 32 households. The 2016 census measured the population of the village as 39 people in 15 households.

In 2020, the rural district was separated from the district in the formation of Sardaran District.
