= Burgan-e Bala =

Village in South Khorasan province, Iran

Burgan-e Bala Persian: بورگان بالا
- Village
- Location within Iran
- Country: Iran
- Province: South Khorasan
- County: Nehbandan
- District: Sardaran
- Rural District: Sahlabad

Population (2016)
  - Total: 22
- Time zone: UTC+3:30 (IRST)

Burgan-e Bala (Persian: بورگان بالا) (Note: Also romanized as Būrgān Bālā, Būrgān-e Bāla, and Būrgān-ye Bālā; also known as Būrgān and Būrkān) is a village in Sahlabad Rural District of Sardaran District in Nehbandan County, South Khorasan province, Iran.

== Demographics ==
=== Population ===
At the time of the 2006 National Census, the village's population was 89 in 19 households, when it was in Arabkhaneh Rural District of Shusef District. The following census in 2011 counted 41 people in 13 households. The 2016 census measured the population of the village as 22 people in eight households.

In 2020, the rural district was separated from the district in the formation of Sardaran District, and Burgan-e Bala was transferred to Sahlabad Rural District created in the new district.
