= Mohammadabad, Sardaran =

Village in South Khorasan province, Iran

Mohammadabad Persian: محمداباد
- Village
- Location within Iran
- Country: Iran
- Province: South Khorasan
- County: Nehbandan
- District: Sardaran
- Rural District: Arabkhaneh

Population (2016)
  - Total: 8
- Time zone: UTC+3:30 (IRST)

Mohammadabad (Persian: محمداباد) (Note: Also romanized as Moḩammadābād; also known as Kalāteh-ye Kadkhodā (كلاته كدخدا)) is a village in Arabkhaneh Rural District of Sardaran District, Nehbandan County, South Khorasan province, Iran.

== Demographics ==
=== Population ===
At the time of the 2006 National Census, the village's population was 21 in six households, when it was in Shusef District. The following census in 2011 counted 13 people in five households. The 2016 census measured the population of the village as eight people in four households.

In 2020, the rural district was separated from the district in the formation of Sardaran District.
