= Hojjatabad, Nehbandan =

Village in South Khorasan province, Iran

Hojjatabad Persian: حجت‌آباد
- Village
- Location within Iran
- Coordinates: 32°12′00″N 59°48′24″E
- Country: Iran
- Province: South Khorasan
- County: Nehbandan
- District: Sardaran
- Rural District: Sahlabad

Population (2016)
  - Total: 20
- Time zone: UTC+3:30 (IRST)

Hojjatabad (Persian: حجت‌آباد) (Note: Also romanized as Ḩojjatābād; also known as Pūkh Āb (پوخ اب)) is a village in Sahlabad Rural District of Sardaran District in Nehbandan County, South Khorasan province, Iran.

== Demographics ==
=== Population ===
At the time of the 2006 National Census, the village's population was 21 in four households, when it was in Shusef Rural District of Shusef District. The following census in 2011 counted 16 people in five households. The 2016 census measured the population of the village as 20 people in seven households.

In 2020, Hojjatabad was separated from the district in the formation of Sardaran District and transferred to Sahlabad Rural District created in the new district.
