= Chugan, South Khorasan =

Village in South Khorasan province, Iran

Chugan Persian: چوگان
- Village
- Location within Iran
- Coordinates: 32°15′28″N 59°21′20″E
- Country: Iran
- Province: South Khorasan
- County: Nehbandan
- District: Sardaran
- Rural District: Arabkhaneh

Population (2016)
  - Total: 37
- Time zone: UTC+3:30 (IRST)

Chugan (Persian: چوگان) (Note: Also romanized as Chūgān; also known as Gaugān and Gowgān) is a village in Arabkhaneh Rural District of Sardaran District in Nehbandan County, South Khorasan province, Iran.

== Demographics ==
=== Population ===
At the time of the 2006 National Census, the village's population was 17 in five households, when it was in Shusef District. The following census in 2011 counted 32 people in 11 households. The 2016 census measured the population of the village as 37 people in 10 households.

In 2020, the rural district was separated from the district in the formation of Sardaran District.
