= Bambur =

Village in South Khorasan province, Iran

Bambur Persian: بمبور
- Village
- Location within Iran
- Coordinates: 32°16′10″N 59°17′04″E
- Country: Iran
- Province: South Khorasan
- County: Nehbandan
- District: Sardaran
- Rural District: Arabkhaneh

Population (2016)
  - Total: 52
- Time zone: UTC+3:30 (IRST)

Bambur (Persian: بمبور) (Note: Also romanized as Bamboor, Bambowr, and Bambūr; also known as Bambor, Bambū, and Kalāteh-ye Bām Bār) is a village in Arabkhaneh Rural District of Sardaran District in Nehbandan County, South Khorasan province, Iran.

== Demographics ==
=== Population ===
At the time of the 2006 National Census, the village's population was 91 in 27 households, when it was in Shusef District. The following census in 2011 counted 79 people in 27 households. The 2016 census measured the population of the village as 52 people in 18 households.

In 2020, the rural district was separated from the district in the formation of Sardaran District.
