= Cheshmeh-ye Zard =

Cheshmeh-ye Zard or Cheshmeh Zard (Persian: چشمه زرد) may refer to:

- Cheshmeh Zard, Razavi Khorasan
- Cheshmeh Zard, Nehbandan, South Khorasan
- Cheshmeh Zard, Shusef, South Khorasan
