= Qasemi, South Khorasan =

Village in South Khorasan province, Iran

Qasemi Persian: قاسمي
- Village
- Location within Iran
- Country: Iran
- Province: South Khorasan
- County: Nehbandan
- District: Sardaran
- Rural District: Arabkhaneh

Population (2016)
  - Total: 0
- Time zone: UTC+3:30 (IRST)

Qasemi (Persian: قاسمي) (Note: Also romanized as Qāsemī) is a village in Arabkhaneh Rural District of Sardaran District in Nehbandan County, South Khorasan province, Iran.

== Demographics ==
=== Population ===
At the time of the 2006 National Census, the village's population was 60 in 15 households, when it was in Meyghan Rural District of the Central District. The village did not appear in the following census of 2011. The 2016 census measured the population of the village as zero.

In 2020, Qasemi was separated from the district in the formation of Sardaran District and transferred to Arabkhaneh Rural District in the new district.
