= Sahlabad Rural District =

Rural district in South Khorasan province, Iran

Sahlabad Rural District Persian: دهستان سهل‌آباد
- Rural District
- Location within Iran
- Coordinates: 32°07′N 59°58′E
- Country: Iran
- Province: South Khorasan
- County: Nehbandan
- District: Sardaran
- Established: 2020
- Capital: Sahlabad
- Time zone: UTC+3:30 (IRST)

Sahlabad Rural District (Persian: دهستان سهل‌آباد) is in Sardaran District of Nehbandan County, South Khorasan province, Iran. Its capital is the village of Sahlabad, whose population at the time of the 2016 National Census was 187 in 54 households.

== History ==
In 2020, Arabkhaneh Rural District was separated from Shusef District in the formation of Sardaran District, and Sahlabad Rural District was created in the new district.

== Other villages in the rural district ==
- Bicheh
- Burgan-e Bala
- Burgan-e Pain
- Dudu
- Duzangan
- Ebrahimi
- Firuzabad
- Garm Daru
- Hojjatabad
- Kalateh-ye Kazemi
- Kalcheh
- Mazar-e Seyyed Ali
- Naimeh
- Seyyed Morad
- Shah Tut
- Shahrak-e Tareh Tajemi Sahlabad
- Shir Shotor
- Shurak
- Tighdar-e Olya
- Torshab-e Olya
- Tutesk
- Vali-ye Asr Agricultural Cooperative
