= Hasanabad-e Sar Kal =

Village in South Khorasan province, Iran

Hasanabad-e Sar Kal Persian: حسن ابادسركل
- Village
- Location within Iran
- Country: Iran
- Province: South Khorasan
- County: Nehbandan
- District: Shusef
- Rural District: Garm-e Tamam Deh

Population (2016)
  - Total: 66
- Time zone: UTC+3:30 (IRST)

Hasanabad-e Sar Kal (Persian: حسن ابادسركل) (Note: Also romanized as Ḩasanābād-e Sar Kal; also known as Ḩasanābād) is a village in Garm-e Tamam Deh Rural District of Shusef District in Nehbandan County, South Khorasan province, Iran.

== Demographics ==
=== Population ===
At the time of the 2006 National Census, the village's population was 100 in 21 households, when it was in Shusef Rural District. The following census in 2011 counted 74 people in 20 households. The 2016 census measured the population of the village as 66 people in 20 households.

In 2020, Hasanabad-e Sar Kal was separated from the rural district in the creation of Garm-e Tamam Deh Rural District.
