= Goleh-ye Cheshmeh, South Khorasan =

Village in South Khorasan province, Iran

Goleh-ye Cheshmeh Persian: گله چشمه
- Village
- Location within Iran
- Country: Iran
- Province: South Khorasan
- County: Nehbandan
- District: Shusef
- Rural District: Garm-e Tamam Deh

Population (2016)
  - Total: 61
- Time zone: UTC+3:30 (IRST)

Goleh-ye Cheshmeh (Persian: گله چشمه) is a village in Garm-e Tamam Deh Rural District of Shusef District in Nehbandan County, South Khorasan province, Iran.

== Demographics ==
=== Population ===
At the time of the 2006 National Census, the village's population was 50 in 11 households, when it was in Bandan Rural District of the Central District. The following census in 2011 counted 53 people in 12 households. The 2016 census measured the population of the village as 61 people in 13 households.

In 2020, Goleh-ye Cheshmeh was separated from the district in the creation of Garm-e Tamam Deh Rural District of Shusef District.
