= Dar Eshkaft =

Village in South Khorasan province, Iran

Dar Eshkaft Persian: درشكفت
- Village
- Location within Iran
- Coordinates: 32°12′30″N 59°26′18″E
- Country: Iran
- Province: South Khorasan
- County: Nehbandan
- District: Sardaran
- Rural District: Arabkhaneh

Population (2016)
  - Total: 63
- Time zone: UTC+3:30 (IRST)

Dar Eshkaft (Persian: درشكفت) (Note: Also known as Dar Shekāf (درشكاف), Dareshkāf, Darreh Eshgoft, Toroshakī, and Turushkaf) is a village in Arabkhaneh Rural District of Sardaran District in Nehbandan County, South Khorasan province, Iran.

== Demographics ==
=== Population ===
At the time of the 2006 National Census, the village's population was 109 in 28 households, when it was in Shusef District. The following census in 2011 counted 82 people in 31 households. The 2016 census measured the population of the village as 63 people in 23 households.

In 2020, the rural district was separated from the district in the formation of Sardaran District.
