= Shand-e Maleki =

Village in South Khorasan province, Iran

Shand-e Maleki Persian: شندملكي
- Village
- Location within Iran
- Coordinates: 31°57′15″N 60°39′24″E
- Country: Iran
- Province: South Khorasan
- County: Nehbandan
- District: Shusef
- Rural District: Garm-e Tamam Deh

Population (2016)
  - Total: 62
- Time zone: UTC+3:30 (IRST)

Shand-e Maleki (Persian: شندملكي) (Note: Also romanized as Shand-e Maleḵī) is a village in Garm-e Tamam Deh Rural District of Shusef District in Nehbandan County, South Khorasan province, Iran.

== Demographics ==
=== Population ===
At the time of the 2006 National Census, the village's population was 33 in seven households, when it was in Bandan Rural District of the Central District. The following census in 2011 counted 72 people in 16 households. The 2016 census measured the population of the village as 62 people in 13 households.

In 2020, Shand-e Maleki was separated from the district in the creation of Garm-e Tamam Deh Rural District of Shusef District.
