= Garm =

Garm may refer to:

== Geography ==
- Garm (crater), a crater on Mars
- Garm (glacier), a glacier in East Greenland
- Garm, South Khorasan, a village in South Khorasan Province, Iran
- Gharm, Tajikistan, a town in the Rasht Valley
- Gharm Oblast, a defunct administrative division of Soviet Union

== Fiction ==
- Garm (Norse mythology), a large dog or wolf in Norse mythology that guards Hel, the land of the dead
- Garm (talking dog), a talking dog from J.R.R. Tolkien's short story "Farmer Giles of Ham"
- Garm Bel Iblis, a character from Star Wars Legends
- The Garm, a dog-like alien being in the Doctor Who episode "Terminus"
- Garm, a character from Vinland Saga
- Garm the Wizard, the main antagonist of the Gauntlet Dark Legacy video game
- GARM, a fictional Swiss glacier research center in Deus Ex: Mankind Divided

== Other uses ==
- Garm (magazine), a Swedish-language satirical magazine published in Finland, 1923–1953
- HNoMS Garm
- Kristoffer Rygg (born 1976), Norwegian musician
- GARM, Global Alliance for Responsible Media

== See also ==
- Galm, a character in the Shining series of video games
- Galm, a squadron in the Ace Combat Zero: The Belkan War
