= Mabadin-e Olya =

Village in South Khorasan province, Iran

Mabadin-e Olya Persian: مبادين عليا
- Village
- Location within Iran
- Country: Iran
- Province: South Khorasan
- County: Nehbandan
- District: Sardaran
- Rural District: Arabkhaneh

Population (2016)
  - Total: 9
- Time zone: UTC+3:30 (IRST)

Mabadin-e Olya (Persian: مبادين عليا) (Note: Also romanized as Mabādīn-e ‘Olyā) is a village in Arabkhaneh Rural District of Sardaran District in Nehbandan County, South Khorasan province, Iran.

== Demographics ==
=== Population ===
At the time of the 2006 National Census, the village's population was 24 in eight households, when it was in Shusef District. The following census in 2011 counted 21 people in 10 households. The 2016 census measured the population of the village as nine people in five households.

In 2020, the rural district was separated from the district in the formation of Sardaran District.
