= Gazidari =

Gazidari or Gazdari or Qazi Dari (Persian: گزيدري) may refer to:

- Gazidari-ye Olya
- Gazidari-ye Sofla
