= Kaleh-ye Sefid =

Village in South Khorasan province, Iran

Kaleh-ye Sefid Persian: كله سفيد
- Village
- Location within Iran
- Coordinates: 32°03′06″N 59°19′12″E
- Country: Iran
- Province: South Khorasan
- County: Nehbandan
- District: Sardaran
- Rural District: Arabkhaneh

Population (2016)
  - Total: 27
- Time zone: UTC+3:30 (IRST)

Kaleh-ye Sefid (Persian: كله سفيد) (Note: Also romanized as Kaleh-ye Sefīd; also known as Kalehsefīd and Kalāteh-ye Sefīd (كلاته سفيد)) is a village in Arabkhaneh Rural District of Sardaran District in Nehbandan County, South Khorasan province, Iran.

== Demographics ==
=== Population ===
At the time of the 2006 National Census, the village's population was 36 in 12 households, when it was in Meyghan Rural District of the Central District. The following census in 2011 counted 25 people in six households. The 2016 census measured the population of the village as 27 people in six households.

In 2020, Kaleh-ye Sefid was separated from the district in the formation of Sardaran District and transferred to Arabkhaneh Rural District in the new district.
