= Dahan Rud, Nehbandan =

Village in South Khorasan province, Iran

Dahan Rud Persian: دهنرود
- Village
- Location within Iran
- Country: Iran
- Province: South Khorasan
- County: Nehbandan
- District: Sardaran
- Rural District: Arabkhaneh

Population (2016)
  - Total: 80
- Time zone: UTC+3:30 (IRST)

Dahan Rud (Persian: دهنرود) (Note: Also romanized as Dahan Rūd; also known as Dahāneh Rūd) is a village in Arabkhaneh Rural District of Sardaran District in Nehbandan County, South Khorasan province, Iran.

== Demographics ==
=== Population ===
At the time of the 2006 National Census, the village's population was 71 in 21 households, when it was in Meyghan Rural District of the Central District. The following census in 2011 counted 74 people in 26 households. The 2016 census measured the population of the village as 80 people in 29 households.

In 2020, Dahan Rud was separated from the district in the formation of Sardaran District and transferred to Arabkhaneh Rural District in the new district.
