= Mahizard =

Village in South Khorasan province, Iran

Mahizard Persian: ماهي زرد
- Village
- Location within Iran
- Coordinates: 32°02′06″N 59°20′46″E
- Country: Iran
- Province: South Khorasan
- County: Nehbandan
- District: Sardaran
- Rural District: Arabkhaneh

Population (2016)
  - Total: 26
- Time zone: UTC+3:30 (IRST)

Mahizard (Persian: ماهي زرد) (Note: Also romanized as Māhīzard) is a village in Arabkhaneh Rural District of Sardaran District in Nehbandan County, South Khorasan province, Iran.

== Demographics ==
=== Population ===
At the time of the 2006 National Census, the village's population was 47 in 20 households, when it was in Meyghan Rural District of the Central District. The following census in 2011 counted 36 people in 12 households. The 2016 census measured the population of the village as 26 people in eight households.

In 2020, Mahizard was separated from the district in the formation of Sardaran District and transferred to Arabkhaneh Rural District in the new district.
