= Zohri =

Village in South Khorasan province, Iran

Zohri Persian: زهري
- Village
- Location within Iran
- Coordinates: 31°59′25″N 59°30′40″E
- Country: Iran
- Province: South Khorasan
- County: Nehbandan
- District: Sardaran
- Rural District: Arabkhaneh

Population (2016)
  - Total: 92
- Time zone: UTC+3:30 (IRST)

Zohri (Persian: زهري) (Note: Also romanized as Zohrī; also known as Zohreh (زهره)) is a village in Arabkhaneh Rural District of Sardaran District in Nehbandan County, South Khorasan province, Iran.

== Demographics ==
=== Population ===
At the time of the 2006 National Census, the village's population was 117 in 34 households, when it was in Meyghan Rural District of the Central District. The following census in 2011 counted 82 people in 28 households. The 2016 census measured the population of the village as 92 people in 33 households.

In 2020, Zohri was separated from the district in the formation of Sardaran District and transferred to Arabkhaneh Rural District in the new district.
