= Luleh =

Village in South Khorasan province, Iran

Luleh Persian: لوله
- Village
- Location within Iran
- Country: Iran
- Province: South Khorasan
- County: Nehbandan
- District: Shusef
- Rural District: Garm-e Tamam Deh

Population (2016)
  - Total: 114
- Time zone: UTC+3:30 (IRST)

Luleh (Persian: لوله) (Note: Also romanized as Lūleh; also known as Kūh Lūleh (كوه لوله)) is a village in Garm-e Tamam Deh Rural District of Shusef District in Nehbandan County, South Khorasan province, Iran.

== Demographics ==
=== Population ===
At the time of the 2006 National Census, the village's population was 139 in 27 households, when it was in Bandan Rural District of the Central District. The following census in 2011 counted 114 people in 34 households. The 2016 census measured the population of the village as 114 people in 27 households.

In 2020, Luleh was separated from the district in the creation of Garm-e Tamam Deh Rural District of Shusef District.
