= Chah-e Mowtowr Hajji Abbas Ardani =

Village in South Khorasan province, Iran

Chah-e Mowtowr Hajji Abbas Ardani Persian: چاه موتورحاجي عباس اردني
- Village
- Location within Iran
- Coordinates: 31°53′59″N 60°25′51″E
- Country: Iran
- Province: South Khorasan
- County: Nehbandan
- District: Shusef
- Rural District: Garm-e Tamam Deh

Population (2016)
  - Total: 839
- Time zone: UTC+3:30 (IRST)

Chah-e Mowtowr Hajji Abbas Ārdanī (Persian: چاه موتورحاجي عباس اردني) (Note: Also romanized as Chāh-e Mowtowr Ḩājjī ‘Abbās Ardani) is a village in Garm-e Tamam Deh Rural District of Shusef District in Nehbandan County, South Khorasan province, Iran.

== Demographics ==
=== Population ===
At the time of the 2006 National Census, the village's population was 682 in 148 households, when it was in Bandan Rural District of the Central District. The following census in 2011 counted 787 people in 228 households. The 2016 census measured the population of the village as 839 people in 259 households.

In 2020, Chah-e Mowtowr Hajji Abbas Ardani was separated from the district in the creation of Garm-e Tamam Deh Rural District of Shusef District.
