= Kuhsar (disambiguation) =

Kuhsar is a city in Alborz Province, Iran.

Kuhsar (Persian: كوهسار) may also refer to:

- Kuhsar, Ardabil
- Kuhsar, South Khorasan
- Kuhsar District, in West Azerbaijan Province
- Kuhsar Rural District (disambiguation)
