= Khvajeh Do Chahi =

Village in South Khorasan province, Iran

Khvajeh Do Chahi Persian: خواجه دوچاهي
- Village
- Location within Iran
- Coordinates: 31°52′41″N 60°31′54″E
- Country: Iran
- Province: South Khorasan
- County: Nehbandan
- District: Shusef
- Rural District: Garm-e Tamam Deh

Population (2016)
  - Total: 352
- Time zone: UTC+3:30 (IRST)

Khvajeh Do Chahi (Persian: خواجه دوچاهي) (Note: Also romanized as Khājeh-Dochāhī and Khvājeh Do Chāhī; also known as Khvājeh Do Chāh, Khvājej Do Jahān, Khvājeh Dūchāhān, and Khwāja Dūchāhi) is a village in Garm-e Tamam Deh Rural District of Shusef District in Nehbandan County, South Khorasan province, Iran.

== Demographics ==
=== Population ===
At the time of the 2006 National Census, the village's population was 845 in 160 households, when it was in Bandan Rural District of the Central District. The following census in 2011 counted 780 people in 171 households. The 2016 census measured the population of the village as 352 people in 85 households.

In 2020, Khvajeh Do Chahi was separated from the district in the creation of Garm-e Tamam Deh Rural District of Shusef District.
