= Kalateh-ye Mazar, Nehbandan =

Village in South Khorasan province, Iran

Kalateh-ye Mazar Persian: كلاته مزار
- Village
- Location within Iran
- Coordinates: 32°10′41″N 59°32′06″E
- Country: Iran
- Province: South Khorasan
- County: Nehbandan
- District: Sardaran
- Rural District: Arabkhaneh

Population (2016)
  - Total: 68
- Time zone: UTC+3:30 (IRST)

Kalateh-ye Mazar (Persian: كلاته مزار) (Note: Also romanized as Kalāteh Mazār and Kalāteh-ye Mazār) is a village in Arabkhaneh Rural District of Sardaran District in Nehbandan County, South Khorasan province, Iran.

== Demographics ==
=== Population ===
At the time of the 2006 National Census, the village's population was 69 in 19 households, when it was in Shusef District. The following census in 2011 counted 61 people in 15 households. The 2016 census measured the population of the village as 68 people in 26 households.

In 2020, the rural district was separated from the district in the formation of Sardaran District.
