= Mahani, South Khorasan =

Village in South Khorasan province, Iran

Mahani Persian: ماهاني
- Village
- Location within Iran
- Coordinates: 32°14′36″N 59°24′52″E
- Country: Iran
- Province: South Khorasan
- County: Nehbandan
- District: Sardaran
- Rural District: Arabkhaneh

Population (2016)
  - Total: 179
- Time zone: UTC+3:30 (IRST)

Mahani (Persian: ماهاني) (Note: Also romanized as Māhānī and Māhanī; also known as Maha’i, Māhonī, and Mahuni) is a village in Arabkhaneh Rural District of Sardaran District in Nehbandan County, South Khorasan province, Iran.

== Demographics ==
=== Population ===
At the time of the 2006 National Census, the village's population was 317 in 75 households, when it was in Shusef District. The following census in 2011 counted 232 people in 70 households. The 2016 census measured the population of the village as 179 people in 52 households.

In 2020, the rural district was separated from the district in the formation of Sardaran District.
