= Kalateh-ye Nuri, South Khorasan =

Village in South Khorasan province, Iran

Kalateh-ye Nuri Persian: كلاته نوري
- Village
- Location within Iran
- Coordinates: 32°08′48″N 59°43′21″E
- Country: Iran
- Province: South Khorasan
- County: Nehbandan
- District: Sardaran
- Rural District: Arabkhaneh

Population (2016)
  - Total: 14
- Time zone: UTC+3:30 (IRST)

Kalateh-ye Nuri (Persian: كلاته نوري) (Note: Also romanized as Kalāteh-i-Nuri and Kalāteh-ye Nūrī; also known as Kalāt-e Mānī, Kalāteh ‘Īsá, and Nūrī) is a village in Arabkhaneh Rural District of Sardaran District in Nehbandan County, South Khorasan province, Iran.

== Demographics ==
=== Population ===
At the time of the 2006 National Census, the village's population was 43 in 13 households, when it was in Shusef District. The following census in 2011 counted 28 people in 10 households. The 2016 census measured the population of the village as 14 people in four households.

In 2020, the rural district was separated from the district in the formation of Sardaran District.
