= Goleh-ye Chah =

Goleh-ye Chah or Galah Chah or Galeh Chah (Persian: گله چاه) may refer to:

- Galah Chah, Sistan and Baluchestan
- Goleh-ye Chah, Nehbandan, South Khorasan Province
- Galeh Chah, Sarayan, South Khorasan Province
