= Kalateh-ye Hasan, South Khorasan =

Village in South Khorasan province, Iran

Kalateh-ye Hasan Persian: كلاته حسن
- Village
- Location within Iran
- Coordinates: 32°03′18″N 59°25′16″E
- Country: Iran
- Province: South Khorasan
- County: Nehbandan
- District: Sardaran
- Rural District: Arabkhaneh

Population (2016)
  - Total: 61
- Time zone: UTC+3:30 (IRST)

Kalateh-ye Hasan (Persian: كلاته حسن) (Note: Also romanized as Kalāteh-ye Ḩasan; also known as Kalāteh Kūh Bālā and Kalāteh-ye Kūh Bālā) is a village in Arabkhaneh Rural District of Sardaran District in Nehbandan County, South Khorasan province, Iran.

== Demographics ==
=== Population ===
At the time of the 2006 National Census, the village's population was 84 in 27 households, when it was in Meyghan Rural District of the Central District. The following census in 2011 counted 71 people in 26 households. The 2016 census measured the population of the village as 61 people in 21 households.

In 2020, Kalateh-ye Hasan was separated from the district in the formation of Sardaran District and transferred to Arabkhaneh Rural District in the new district.
