= Hoseynabad-e Qasem =

Village in South Khorasan province, Iran

Hoseynabad-e Qasem Persian: حسين ابادقاسم
- Village
- Location within Iran
- Coordinates: 32°01′40″N 59°23′51″E
- Country: Iran
- Province: South Khorasan
- County: Nehbandan
- District: Sardaran
- Rural District: Arabkhaneh

Population (2016)
  - Total: 159
- Time zone: UTC+3:30 (IRST)

Hoseynabad-e Qasem (Persian: حسين ابادقاسم) (Note: Also romanized as Ḩoseynābād-e Qāsem; also known as Ḩoseynābād) is a village in Arabkhaneh Rural District of Sardaran District in Nehbandan County, South Khorasan province, Iran.

== Demographics ==
=== Population ===
At the time of the 2006 National Census, the village's population was 196 in 62 households, when it was in Meyghan Rural District of the Central District. The following census in 2011 counted 173 people in 54 households. The 2016 census measured the population of the village as 159 people in 57 households.

In 2020, Hoseynabad-e Qasem was separated from the district in the formation of Sardaran District and transferred to Arabkhaneh Rural District in the new district.
