= Dehak, South Khorasan =

Village in South Khorasan province, Iran

Dehak Persian: دهك
- Village
- Location within Iran
- Coordinates: 32°11′17″N 59°31′20″E
- Country: Iran
- Province: South Khorasan
- County: Nehbandan
- District: Sardaran
- Rural District: Arabkhaneh

Population (2016)
  - Total: 826
- Time zone: UTC+3:30 (IRST)

Dehak (Persian: دهك) (Note: Also romanized as Dehek; also known as Dihik) is a village in Arabkhaneh Rural District of Sardaran District in Nehbandan County, South Khorasan province, Iran, serving as capital of both the district and the rural district.

== Demographics ==
=== Population ===
At the time of the 2006 National Census, the village's population was 799 in 205 households, when it was in Shusef District. The following census in 2011 counted 1,061 people in 257 households. The 2016 census measured the population of the village as 826 people in 243 households, the most populous in its rural district.

In 2020, the rural district was separated from the district in the formation of Sardaran District.
