= Naimeh, Nehbandan =

Village in South Khorasan province, Iran

Naimeh Persian: نايمه
- Village
- Location within Iran
- Country: Iran
- Province: South Khorasan
- County: Nehbandan
- District: Sardaran
- Rural District: Sahlabad

Population (2016)
  - Total: 12
- Time zone: UTC+3:30 (IRST)

Naimeh (Persian: نايمه) (Note: Also romanized as Nāīmeh'; also known as Nā’eh, Nā’emeh, Naemeh, and Nā’emī) is a village in Sahlabad Rural District of Sardaran District in Nehbandan County, South Khorasan province, Iran.

== Demographics ==
=== Population ===
At the time of the 2006 National Census, the village's population was 51 in 17 households, when it was in Arabkhaneh Rural District of Shusef District. The following census in 2011 counted 39 people in 13 households. The 2016 census measured the population of the village as 12 people in four households.

In 2020, the rural district was separated from the district in the formation of Sardaran District, and Naimeh was transferred to Sahlabad Rural District created in the new district.
