= Mabadin-e Sofla =

Village in South Khorasan province, Iran

Mabadin-e Sofla Persian: مبادين سفلي
- Village
- Location within Iran
- Coordinates: 32°14′28″N 59°21′57″E
- Country: Iran
- Province: South Khorasan
- County: Nehbandan
- District: Sardaran
- Rural District: Arabkhaneh

Population (2016)
  - Total: 20
- Time zone: UTC+3:30 (IRST)

Mabadin-e Sofla (Persian: مبادين سفلي) (Note: Also romanized as Mabādīn-e Soflá) is a village in Arabkhaneh Rural District of Sardaran District in Nehbandan County, South Khorasan province, Iran.

== Demographics ==
=== Population ===
At the time of the 2006 National Census, the village's population was 38 in 12 households, when it was in Shusef District. The following census in 2011 counted 77 people in 23 households. The 2016 census measured the population of the village as 20 people in seven households.

In 2020, the rural district was separated from the district in the formation of Sardaran District.
