= Seyedal Rural District =

Rural district in South Khorasan province, Iran

Seyedal Rural District Persian: دهستان سیدال
- Rural District
- Location within Iran
- Coordinates: 32°00′N 59°30′E
- Country: Iran
- Province: South Khorasan
- County: Nehbandan
- District: Sardaran
- Established: 2020
- Capital: Seyedal
- Time zone: UTC+3:30 (IRST)

Seyedal Rural District (Persian: دهستان سیدال) is in Sardaran District of Nehbandan County, South Khorasan province, Iran. Its capital is the village of Seyedal, whose population at the time of the 2016 National Census was 582 in 169 households.

== History ==
In 2020, Arabkhaneh Rural District was separated from Shusef District in the formation of Sardaran District, and Seyedal Rural District was created in the new district.

== Other villages in the rural district ==
- Barak
- Cheshmeh Zard
- Deh Sheykh
- Garu
- Gazidari-ye Olya
- Gazidari-ye Sofla
- Hasanabad-e Korq-e Sang
- Kalateh-ye Now
- Khosrowabad
- Khunikak
- Mahalabad-e Sofla
- Manganeh-ye Ay
- Mirabad
- Pustin
- Samak
- Semani-ye Sofla
- Soltani-ye Olya
- Yazdan Chah
