= Abbasabad-e Kollab =

Village in South Khorasan province, Iran

Abbasabad-e Kollab Persian: عباس ابادكلب
- Village
- Location within Iran
- Coordinates: 31°53′17″N 59°36′23″E
- Country: Iran
- Province: South Khorasan
- County: Nehbandan
- District: Sardaran
- Rural District: Arabkhaneh

Population (2016)
  - Total: 92
- Time zone: UTC+3:30 (IRST)

Abbasabad-e Kollab (Persian: عباس ابادكلب) (Note: Also romanized as ‘Abbāsābād-e Kollab; also known as ‘Abbāsābād-e Golāb) is a village in Arabkhaneh Rural District of Sardaran District in Nehbandan County, South Khorasan province, Iran.

== Demographics ==
=== Population ===
At the time of the 2006 National Census, the village's population was 154 in 36 households, when it was in Meyghan Rural District of the Central District. The following census in 2011 counted 176 people in 50 households. The 2016 census measured the population of the village as 92 people in 27 households.

In 2020, Abbasabad-e Kollab was separated from the district in the formation of Sardaran District and transferred to Arabkhaneh Rural District in the new district.
