= Kal Chahi =

Village in South Khorasan province, Iran

Kal Chahi Persian: كل چاهي
- Village
- Country: Iran
- Province: South Khorasan
- County: Nehbandan
- District: Shusef
- Rural District: Garm-e Tamam Deh

Population (2016)
  - Total: 19
- Time zone: UTC+3:30 (IRST)

Kal Chahi (Persian: كل چاهي) (Note: Also romanized as Kal Chāhī) is a village in Garm-e Tamam Deh Rural District of Shusef District in Nehbandan County, South Khorasan province, Iran.

== Demographics ==
=== Population ===
At the time of the 2006 National Census, the village's population was 20 in five households, when it was in Bandan Rural District of the Central District. The following census in 2011 counted a population below the reporting threshold. The 2016 census measured the population of the village as 19 people in four households.

In 2020, Kal Chahi was separated from the district in the creation of Garm-e Tamam Deh Rural District of Shusef District.
