= Shand-e Masumeh =

Village in South Khorasan province, Iran

Shand-e Masumeh Persian: شندمعصومه
- Village
- Location within Iran
- Coordinates: 31°56′59″N 60°36′04″E
- Country: Iran
- Province: South Khorasan
- County: Nehbandan
- District: Shusef
- Rural District: Garm-e Tamam Deh

Population (2016)
  - Total: 147
- Time zone: UTC+3:30 (IRST)

Shand-e Masumeh (Persian: شندمعصومه) (Note: Also romanized as Shand-e Ma‘şūmeh) is a village in Garm-e Tamam Deh Rural District of Shusef District in Nehbandan County, South Khorasan province, Iran.

== Demographics ==
=== Population ===
At the time of the 2006 National Census, the village's population was 149 in 30 households, when it was in Bandan Rural District of the Central District. The following census in 2011 counted 137 people in 31 households. The 2016 census measured the population of the village as 147 people in 34 households.

In 2020, Shand-e Masumeh was separated from the district in the creation of Garm-e Tamam Deh Rural District of Shusef District.
