= Khomeyniabad =

Village in South Khorasan province, Iran

Khomeyniabad Persian: خميني اباد
- Village
- Location within Iran
- Country: Iran
- Province: South Khorasan
- County: Nehbandan
- District: Shusef
- Rural District: Garm-e Tamam Deh

Population (2016)
  - Total: 28
- Time zone: UTC+3:30 (IRST)

Khomeyniabad (Persian: خميني اباد) (Note: Also romanized as Khomeynīābād) is a village in Garm-e Tamam Deh Rural District of Shusef District in Nehbandan County, South Khorasan province, Iran.

== Demographics ==
=== Population ===
At the time of the 2006 National Census, the village's population was 73 in 17 households, when it was in Bandan Rural District of the Central District. The following census in 2011 counted 43 people in 12 households. The 2016 census measured the population of the village as 28 people in eight households.

In 2020, Khomeyniabad was separated from the district in the creation of Garm-e Tamam Deh Rural District of Shusef District.
