= Mabadin =

Mabadin (Persian: مبادين) may refer to:

- Mabadin-e Olya
- Mabadin-e Sofla
