= Bandank =

Bandank بندانک /سیکوری سفلی
- Village
- Country: Iran
- Province: South Khorasan
- County: Nehbandan
- Bakhsh: Shusef
- Rural District: Shusef

Population (2006)
  - Total: 92
- Time zone: UTC+3:30 (IRST)
  - Summer (DST): UTC+4:30 (IRDT)

Bandank (Persian: بندانک /سیکوری سفلی, also Romanized as Bandānḵ; also known as Sīḵūri-ye Soflá) is a village in Shusef Rural District, Shusef District, Nehbandan County, South Khorasan Province, Iran. At the 2006 census, its population was 92, in 20 families.
