= Dubeshk =

Village in South Khorasan province, Iran

Dubeshk Persian: دوبشك
- Village
- Country: Iran
- Province: South Khorasan
- County: Nehbandan
- District: Sardaran
- Rural District: Arabkhaneh

Population (2016)
  - Total: Below reporting threshold
- Time zone: UTC+3:30 (IRST)

Dubeshk (Persian: دوبشك) (Note: Also romanized as Dūbeshḵ) is a village in Arabkhaneh Rural District of Sardaran District in Nehbandan County, South Khorasan province, Iran.

== Demographics ==
=== Population ===
At the time of the 2006 National Census, the village's population was 16 in four households, when it was in Meyghan Rural District of the Central District. The following census in 2011 again counted 16 people in four households. The 2016 census measured the population of the village as below the reporting threshold.

In 2020, Dubeshk was separated from the district in the formation of Sardaran District and transferred to Arabkhaneh Rural District in the new district.
