= Shurak, Nehbandan =

Village in South Khorasan province, Iran

Shurak Persian: شورك
- Village
- Location within Iran
- Country: Iran
- Province: South Khorasan
- County: Nehbandan
- District: Shusef
- Rural District: Garm-e Tamam Deh

Population (2016)
  - Total: 0
- Time zone: UTC+3:30 (IRST)

Shurak (Persian: شورك) (Note: Also romanized as Shūrak) is a village in Garm-e Tamam Deh Rural District of Shusef District in Nehbandan County, South Khorasan province, Iran.

== Demographics ==
=== Population ===
At the time of the 2006 National Census, the village's population was 21 in six households, when it was in Bandan Rural District of the Central District. The village did not appear in the following census of 2011. The 2016 census measured the population of the village as zero.

In 2020, Shurak was separated from the district in the creation of Garm-e Tamam Deh Rural District of Shusef District.
