= Zangui, Nehbandan =

Village in South Khorasan province, Iran

Zangui Persian: زنگوئي
- Village
- Country: Iran
- Province: South Khorasan
- County: Nehbandan
- District: Sardaran
- Rural District: Arabkhaneh

Population (2016)
  - Total: 14
- Time zone: UTC+3:30 (IRST)

Zangui (Persian: زنگوئي) (Note: Also romanized as Zangū'ī) is a village in Arabkhaneh Rural District of Sardaran District in Nehbandan County, South Khorasan province, Iran.

== Demographics ==
=== Population ===
At the time of the 2006 National Census, the village's population was 53 in 15 households, when it was in Meyghan Rural District of the Central District. The following census in 2011 counted 23 people in eight households. The 2016 census measured the population of the village as 14 people in six households.

In 2020, Zangui was separated from the district in the formation of Sardaran District and transferred to Arabkhaneh Rural District in the new district.
