= Gaveh, Nehbandan =

Village in South Khorasan province, Iran

Gaveh Persian: گاوه
- Village
- Location within Iran
- Country: Iran
- Province: South Khorasan
- County: Nehbandan
- District: Sardaran
- Rural District: Arabkhaneh

Population (2016)
  - Total: 0
- Time zone: UTC+3:30 (IRST)

Gaveh (Persian: گاوه) (Note: Also romanized as Gāveh) is a village in Arabkhaneh Rural District of Sardaran District in Nehbandan County, South Khorasan province, Iran.

== Demographics ==
=== Population ===
At the time of the 2006 National Census, the village's population was 28 in eight households, when it was in Meyghan Rural District of the Central District. The village did not appear in the following census of 2011. The 2016 census measured the population of the village as zero.

In 2020, Gaveh was separated from the district in the formation of Sardaran District and transferred to Arabkhaneh Rural District in the new district.
