= Seyedal =

Village in South Khorasan province, Iran

Seyedal Persian: سيدال
- Village
- Location within Iran
- Coordinates: 32°01′16″N 59°23′59″E
- Country: Iran
- Province: South Khorasan
- County: Nehbandan
- District: Sardaran
- Rural District: Seyedal

Population (2016)
  - Total: 582
- Time zone: UTC+3:30 (IRST)

Seyedal (Persian: سيدال) (Note: Also romanized as Saidal, Seydāl, Seyedāl, and Seyyedal; also known as Sadan) is a village in, and the capital of, Seyedal Rural District in Sardaran District of Nehbandan County, South Khorasan province, Iran.

== Demographics ==
=== Population ===
At the time of the 2006 National Census, the village's population was 602 in 158 households, when it was in Meyghan Rural District of the Central District. The following census in 2011 counted 527 people in 156 households. The 2016 census measured the population of the village as 582 people in 169 households.

In 2020, Seyedal was separated from the rural district in the formation of Sardaran District and transferred to Seyedal Rural District created in the new district.
