= Kalateh-ye Mahmud Ali =

Village in South Khorasan province, Iran

Kalateh-ye Mahmud Ali Persian: كلاته محمودعلي
- Village
- Location within Iran
- Country: Iran
- Province: South Khorasan
- County: Nehbandan
- District: Sardaran
- Rural District: Arabkhaneh

Population (2016)
  - Total: 68
- Time zone: UTC+3:30 (IRST)

Kalateh-ye Mahmud Ali (Persian: كلاته محمودعلي) (Note: Also romanized as Kalāteh-ye Maḩmūd ‘Alī; also known as Mahmood Ali and Maḩmūd ‘Alī (محمودعل)) is a village in Arabkhaneh Rural District of Sardaran District in Nehbandan County, South Khorasan province, Iran.

== Demographics ==
=== Population ===
At the time of the 2006 National Census, the village's population was 76 in 23 households, when it was in Meyghan Rural District of the Central District. The following census in 2011 counted 94 people in 26 households. The 2016 census measured the population of the village as 68 people in 20 households.

In 2020, Kalateh-ye Mahmud Ali was separated from the district in the formation of Sardaran District and transferred to Arabkhaneh Rural District in the new district.
