= Kalateh-ye Nuri =

Kalateh-ye Nuri (Persian: كلاته نوري); also simply Nuri, may refer to:

- Kalateh-ye Nuri, Razavi Khorasan
- Kalateh-ye Nuri, South Khorasan
