= Khvajeh Monji Kuh =

Village in South Khorasan province, Iran

Khvajeh Monji Kuh Persian: خواجه منجيكوه
- Village
- Location within Iran
- Coordinates: 31°59′21″N 60°37′02″E
- Country: Iran
- Province: South Khorasan
- County: Nehbandan
- District: Shusef
- Rural District: Garm-e Tamam Deh

Population (2016)
  - Total: 136
- Time zone: UTC+3:30 (IRST)

Khvajeh Monji Kuh (Persian: خواجه منجيكوه) (Note: Also romanized as Khvājeh Monjī Kūh) is a village in Garm-e Tamam Deh Rural District of Shusef District in Nehbandan County, South Khorasan province, Iran.

== Demographics ==
=== Population ===
At the time of the 2006 National Census, the village's population was 124 in 24 households, when it was in Bandan Rural District of the Central District. The following census in 2011 counted 138 people in 30 households. The 2016 census measured the population of the village as 136 people in 40 households.

In 2020, Khvajeh Monji Kuh was separated from the district in the creation of Garm-e Tamam Deh Rural District of Shusef District.
