= Owlang, South Khorasan =

Village in South Khorasan province, Iran

Owlang Persian: اولنگ
- Village
- Location within Iran
- Country: Iran
- Province: South Khorasan
- County: Nehbandan
- District: Sardaran
- Rural District: Arabkhaneh

Population (2016)
  - Total: 52
- Time zone: UTC+3:30 (IRST)

Owlang (Persian: اولنگ) (Note: Also romanized as Aulang; also known as Olang) is a village in Arabkhaneh Rural District of Sardaran District in Nehbandan County, South Khorasan province, Iran.

== Demographics ==
=== Population ===
At the time of the 2006 National Census, the village's population was 112 in 26 households, when it was in Shusef District. The following census in 2011 counted 102 people in 28 households. The 2016 census measured the population of the village as 52 people in 17 households.

In 2020, the rural district was separated from the district in the formation of Sardaran District.
