= Shurabad, South Khorasan =

Village in South Khorasan province, Iran

Shurabad Persian: شورآباد
- Village
- Location within Iran
- Country: Iran
- Province: South Khorasan
- County: Nehbandan
- District: Sardaran
- Rural District: Arabkhaneh

Population (2016)
  - Total: Below reporting threshold
- Time zone: UTC+3:30 (IRST)

Shurabad (Persian: شورآباد) (Note: Also romanized as Shūrābād) is a village in Arabkhaneh Rural District of Sardaran District in Nehbandan County, South Khorasan province, Iran.

== Demographics ==
=== Population ===
At the time of the 2006 National Census, the village's population was 22 in five households, when it was in Meyghan Rural District of the Central District. The following census in 2011 counted 15 people in four households. The 2016 census measured the population of the village as below the reporting threshold.

In 2020, Shurabad was separated from the district in the formation of Sardaran District and transferred to Arabkhaneh Rural District in the new district.
