= Hirad =

Village in South Khorasan province, Iran

Hirad Persian: هيرد
- Village
- Location within Iran
- Coordinates: 31°57′38″N 59°13′23″E
- Country: Iran
- Province: South Khorasan
- County: Nehbandan
- District: Sardaran
- Rural District: Arabkhaneh

Population (2016)
  - Total: 85
- Time zone: UTC+3:30 (IRST)

Hirad (Persian: هيرد) (Note: Also romanized as Hīrad and Hīrod; also known as Hūrāid and Hūrīd) is a village in Arabkhaneh Rural District of Sardaran District in Nehbandan County, South Khorasan province, Iran.

== Demographics ==
=== Population ===
At the time of the 2006 National Census, the village's population was 95 in 27 households, when it was in Meyghan Rural District of the Central District. The following census in 2011 counted 77 people in 22 households. The 2016 census measured the population of the village as 85 people in 25 households.

In 2020, Hirad was separated from the district in the formation of Sardaran District and transferred to Arabkhaneh Rural District in the new district.
