= Kalateh-ye Mazar =

Kalateh-ye Mazar or Kalateh Mazar (Persian: كلاته مزار) may refer to:

- Kalateh-ye Mazar, Nehbandan, South Khorasan Province
- Kalateh-ye Mazar, Zirkuh, South Khorasan Province
- Kalateh-ye Mazar, Razavi Khorasan
