= Simorgh (disambiguation) =

A Simorgh or Simurgh (Persian: سیمرغ) is a mythical flying creature of Persia.

Simorgh may also refer to:

- Samak, South Khorasan or Simorgh, a village in South Khorasan province, Iran
- Simorq (car), a hybrid car designed and produced in Iran
- Simorgh (aircraft), a HESA-built two-seat Northrop F-5
- Simorgh (rocket), an Iranian expendable small-capacity orbital carrier rocket
- Simorgh County, an administrative division of Mazandaran province
- The Simurgh, a monstrous creature in the web serial Worm

== See also ==
- Simorgh Alborz F.C., a football team in Afghanistan
