= Ulang =

Ulang may refer to:

- Ulang County, in Sudan
- Owlang (disambiguation), places in Iran
