= Naeh =

Naeh may refer to:

- Avraham Chaim Naeh (1890–1954), Also Na'eh Rabbi born in Hebron in Israel (at the time known as Jewish Palestine prior to independence in 1948)
- Eitan Na'eh, an Israeli diplomat
- Naeh, Iran, a village in South Khorasan Province, Iran
