= Mahani =

Mahani or Mahoni or Mahuni (Persian: ماهاني) may refer to:

- Mahani, Bushehr
- Mahani, South Khorasan
