= Anaran =

Anaran (Persian: اناران) may refer to:

- Anaran, Nehbandan, South Khorasan Province
- Anaran Rural District, in Ilam Province
