= Goleh-ye Chah, Nehbandan =

Village in South Khorasan province, Iran

Goleh-ye Chah Persian: گله چاه
- Village
- Country: Iran
- Province: South Khorasan
- County: Nehbandan
- District: Shusef
- Rural District: Garm-e Tamam Deh

Population (2016)
  - Total: 56
- Time zone: UTC+3:30 (IRST)

Goleh-ye Chah (Persian: گله چاه) (Note: Also romanized as Goleh-ye Chāh) is a village in Garm-e Tamam Deh Rural District of Shusef District in Nehbandan County, South Khorasan province, Iran.

== Demographics ==
=== Population ===
At the time of the 2006 National Census, the village's population was 107 in 21 households, when it was in Bandan Rural District of the Central District. The following census in 2011 counted 29 people in five households. The 2016 census measured the population of the village as 56 people in 14 households.

In 2020, Goleh-ye Chah was separated from the district in the creation of Garm-e Tamam Deh Rural District of Shusef District.
