= Naemi =

Naemi may refer to:

- Naemi Briese (1908–1980), Swedish actress
- Dahi Al Naemi (b. 1978), Qatari footballer
- Naemi, Iran, a village in South Khorasan Province
