= Owlang =

Owlang or Aulang or Olang or Ulang (Persian: اولنگ) may refer to:

- Olang, Golestan
- Ulang, Golestan
- Owlang, South Khorasan
- Owlang, Zanjan
- Owlang-e Amanabad, Razavi Khorasan Province
- Olang-e Asadi, Razavi Khorasan Province
