= Cheshmeh Zard, Arabkhaneh =

Village in South Khorasan province, Iran

Cheshmeh Zard Persian: چشمه زرد
- Village
- Country: Iran
- Province: South Khorasan
- County: Nehbandan
- District: Sardaran
- Rural District: Arabkhaneh

Population (2016)
  - Total: 18
- Time zone: UTC+3:30 (IRST)

Cheshmeh Zard (Persian: چشمه زرد) is a village in Arabkhaneh Rural District of Sardaran District in Nehbandan County, South Khorasan province, Iran.

== Demographics ==
=== Population ===
At the time of the 2006 National Census, the village's population was 32 in 10 households, when it was in Meyghan Rural District of the Central District. The following census in 2011 counted 38 people in 12 households. The 2016 census measured the population of the village as 18 people in six households.

In 2020, Cheshmeh Zard was separated from the district in the formation of Sardaran District and transferred to Arabkhaneh Rural District in the new district.
