= Qadamgah Castle =

Castle in South Khorasan Province, Iran

Qadamgah castle
- قلعه قدمگاه

General information
- Type: Castle
- Location: Nehbandan County, Iran

Qadamgah castle (Persian: قلعه قدمگاه) is a historical castle located in Nehbandan County in South Khorasan Province, The longevity of this fortress dates back to the Afsharid dynasty.
