= Garm-e Tamam Deh =

Village in South Khorasan province, Iran

Garm-e Tamam Deh Persian: گرم تمام ده
- Village
- Location within Iran
- Coordinates: 31°56′07″N 60°21′10″E
- Country: Iran
- Province: South Khorasan
- County: Nehbandan
- District: Shusef
- Rural District: Garm-e Tamam Deh

Population (2016)
  - Total: 161
- Time zone: UTC+3:30 (IRST)

Garm-e Tamam Deh (Persian: گرم تمام ده) (Note: Also romanized as Garm Tamām Deh and Garm-e Tamām Deh; also known as Garm (گرم)) is a village in, and the capital of, Garm-e Tamam Deh Rural District in Shusef District of Nehbandan County, South Khorasan province, Iran.

== Demographics ==
=== Population ===
At the time of the 2006 National Census, the village's population was 137 in 33 households, when it was in Bandan Rural District of the Central District. The following census in 2011 counted 137 people in 35 households. The 2016 census measured the population of the village as 161 people in 40 households.

In 2020, Garm-e Tamam Deh was separated from the district in the creation of Garm-e Tamam Deh Rural District of Shusef District.
