= Turushka =

Turushka (or Turuṣka) may refer to:

- a common Sanskrit descriptor for Mohammedans (Muslims), whether of Turkish origin or otherwise
- a Sanskrit word for olibanum
- a term often used for Turks in some ancient sources; see Kushan Empire § Origins

== See also ==
- Turushkaf, a village in Arabkhaneh Rural District, South Khorasan Province, Iran
