= Shusef =

City in South Khorasan province, Iran

Shusef Persian: شوسف
- City
- Location within Iran
- Coordinates: 31°48′13″N 60°00′23″E
- Country: Iran
- Province: South Khorasan
- County: Nehbandan
- District: Shusef
- Established as a city: 2000

Population (2016)
  - Total: 3,181
- Time zone: UTC+3:30 (IRST)

Shusef (Persian: شوسف) (Note: Also romanized as Shoosaf, Shūsef, and Shūsf; also known as Shusp) is a city in, and the capital of, Shusef District of Nehbandan County, South Khorasan province, Iran. It also serves as the administrative center for Shusef Rural District. The village of Shusef was converted to a city in 2000.

== Demographics ==
=== Population ===
At the time of the 2006 National Census, the city's population was 2,338 in 572 households. The following census in 2011 counted 3,010 people in 808 households. The 2016 census measured the population of the city as 3,181 people in 879 households.
