= Garm-e Tamam Deh Rural District =

Rural district in South Khorasan province, Iran

Garm-e Tamam Deh Rural District Persian: دهستان گرم تمام ده
- Rural District
- Location within Iran
- Coordinates: 31°51′N 60°29′E
- Country: Iran
- Province: South Khorasan
- County: Nehbandan
- District: Shusef
- Established: 2020
- Capital: Garm-e Tamam Deh
- Time zone: UTC+3:30 (IRST)

Garm-e Tamam Deh Rural District (Persian: دهستان گرم تمام ده) is in Shusef District of Nehbandan County, South Khorasan province, Iran. Its capital is the village of Garm-e Tamam Deh, whose population at the 2016 National Census was 161 in 40 households.

== History ==
Garm-e Tamam Deh Rural District was created in Shusef District in 2020.

== Other villages in the rural district ==
- Abdazdi
- Chah-e Mowtowr Hajji Abbas Ardani
- Gisheh
- Goleh-ye Chah
- Goleh-ye Cheshmeh
- Hasanabad-e Sar Kal
- Hoseynabad-e Sar Kal
- Kal Chahi
- Karsunak
- Khomeyniabad
- Khvajeh Do Chahi
- Khvajeh Monji Kuh
- Kuyerek
- Luleh
- Mohammadabad
- Shand-e Maleki
- Shand-e Masumeh
- Shirazeh
- Shurak
- Talaran-e Markazi
