= Galah Chah, Sistan and Baluchestan =

Galah Chah گله چاه
- Village
- Location within Iran
- Coordinates: 31°10′58″N 61°45′24″E
- Country: Iran
- Province: Sistan and Baluchestan
- County: Hirmand
- Bakhsh: Central
- Rural District: Dust Mohammad

Population (2006)
  - Total: 590
- Time zone: UTC+3:30 (IRST)
  - Summer (DST): UTC+4:30 (IRDT)

Galah Chah (Persian: گله چاه, also Romanized as Galah Chāh) is a village in Dust Mohammad Rural District, in the Central District of Hirmand County, Sistan and Baluchestan Province, Iran. At the 2006 census, its population was 590, in 124 families.
