= Kuhsar Rural District =

Kuhsar Rural District (Persian: دهستان كوهسار) may refer to:

- Kuhsar Rural District (Hashtrud County)
- Kuhsar Rural District (Khansar County)
- Kuhsar Rural District (Markazi Province)
