= Tolly Burkan =

American firewalker and writer

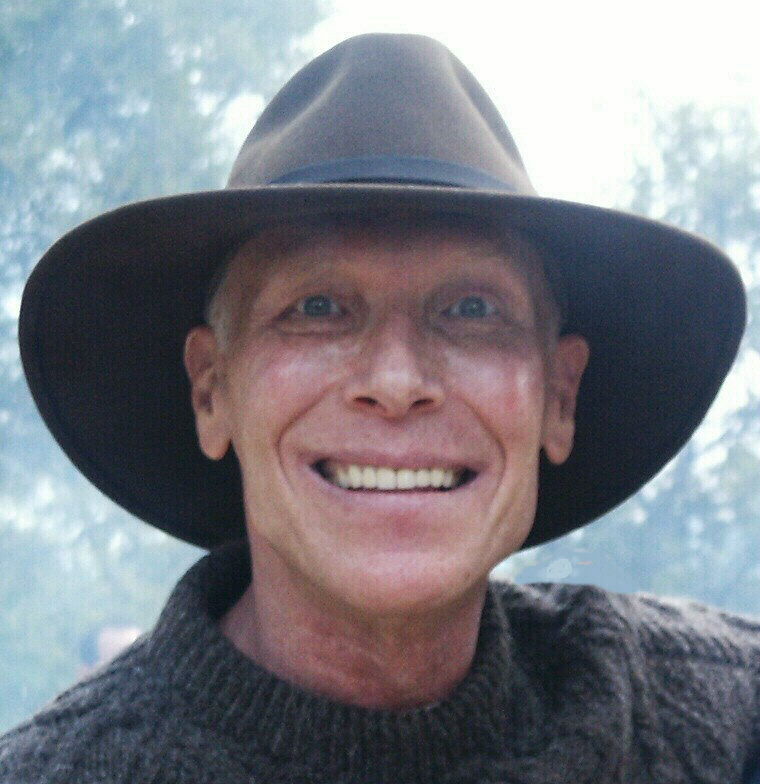
- Burkan in 2005
- Born: May 17, 1948 (age 78); New York City, New York, U.S.
- Occupations: Firewalker; Magician
- Website: tollyburkan.com

Tolly Burkan, also known as Bruce Burkan (/bərˈkæn/ burr-KAN) born May 17, 1948, in New York City, is a firewalker and former magician. He is part of the Human Potential Movement. He is also the founder of the Firewalking Institute of Research and Education.

== Biography ==
During the 1970s, Burkan created a firewalking class and began teaching firewalking to the general public. In the 1980s, he started working with large corporations and began training instructors.

Burkan's disappearance from Asbury Park, New Jersey and his subsequent reappearance two months later, after a memorial service, was the subject of national news in 1967. Although he would explain in his book Dying to Live and in news stories years later that he had run away from home for two months, the incident would continue to be cited in pseudoscience books as "still unexplained" and evidence of alien abduction or teleportation

== Bibliography ==
- Extreme Spirituality
- Let It Be Easy
- Dying to Live: From Despair and Death to Freedom and Joy
- Guiding Yourself Into a Spiritual Reality
