= Kalateh-ye Nuri, Razavi Khorasan =

Kalateh-ye Nuri كلاته نوري
- Village
- Location within Iran
- Coordinates: 36°23′41″N 59°34′36″E
- Country: Iran
- Province: Razavi Khorasan
- County: Mashhad
- Bakhsh: Central
- Rural District: Tus

Population (2006)
  - Total: 186
- Time zone: UTC+3:30 (IRST)
  - Summer (DST): UTC+4:30 (IRDT)

Kalateh-ye Nuri (Persian: كلاته نوري, also Romanized as Kalāteh-ye Nūrī; also known as Nūrī) is a village in Tus Rural District, in the Central District of Mashhad County, Razavi Khorasan Province, Iran. At the 2006 census, its population was 186, in 47 families.
