= Olang-e Asadi =

Olang-e Asadi النگ اسدي
- Village
- Location within Iran
- Coordinates: 36°15′27″N 59°48′44″E
- Country: Iran
- Province: Razavi Khorasan
- County: Mashhad
- Bakhsh: Central
- Rural District: Kenevist

Population (2006)
  - Total: 48
- Time zone: UTC+3:30 (IRST)
  - Summer (DST): UTC+4:30 (IRDT)

Olang-e Asadi (Persian: النگ اسدي, also Romanized as Olang-e Āsadī) is a village in Kenevist Rural District, in the Central District of Mashhad County, Razavi Khorasan Province, Iran. At the 2006 census, its population was 48, in 15 families.
