= HNoMS Garm =

Two ships of the Royal Norwegian Navy have borne the name HNoMS Garm, after the Ragnarök hound Garmr:

- HNoMS Garm (1913) was a Draug-class destroyer launched in 1913 and sunk by German aircraft in 1940.
- HNoMS Garm (K538) was the ex-Canadian Prestonian-class frigate HMCS Toronto launched in 1943 and transferred to the Royal Norwegian Navy in 1956. Renamed HNoMS Valkyrien as a motor torpedo boat support ship in 1965 and decommissioned in 1977.
