= Arabkhaneh Rural District =

Rural district in South Khorasan province, Iran

Arabkhaneh Rural District Persian: دهستان عربخانه
- Rural District
- Location within Iran
- Coordinates: 32°13′N 59°31′E
- Country: Iran
- Province: South Khorasan
- County: Nehbandan
- District: Sardaran
- Established: 1987
- Capital: Dehak

Population (2016)
  - Total: 3,872
- Time zone: UTC+3:30 (IRST)

Arabkhaneh Rural District (Persian: دهستان عربخانه) is in Sardaran District of Nehbandan County, South Khorasan province, Iran. Its capital is the village of Dehak.

== Demographics ==
=== Language ===
While Iranians have Arabic as a religious second language, Arabkhaneh is one of the few areas of Iran that speak it a first language.

=== Population ===
At the time of the 2006 National Census, the rural district's population (as a part of Shusef District) was 5,738 in 1,619 households. There were 5,341 inhabitants in 1,693 households at the following census of 2011. The 2016 census measured the population of the rural district as 3,872 in 1,287 households. The most populous of its 107 villages was Dehak, with 826 people.

In 2020, the rural district was separated from the district in the formation of Sardaran District.

=== Other villages in the rural district ===
- Abbasabad-e Kollab
- Anaran
- Bambur
- Bisheh
- Buri
- Chah Kord
- Cheshmeh Zard
- Chugan
- Dahan Rud
- Dar Eshkaft
- Darreh Kuran
- Darudi
- Dubeshk
- Eslamabad
- Esmailabad
- Estakhrak
- Faratan
- Gandeshkan
- Gaveh
- Gazan
- Hajjiabad
- Harishi
- Hasanabad
- Hashtugan
- Hirad
- Hoseynabad-e Arabkhaneh
- Hoseynabad-e Qasem
- Kalateh-ye Ali Avaz
- Kalateh-ye Aliabad
- Kalateh-ye Hasan
- Kalateh-ye Mahmud Ali
- Kalateh-ye Mazar
- Kalateh-ye Nuri
- Kalateh-ye Sarvar
- Kaleh-ye Sefid
- Kasgan
- Khorrami
- Khosravi
- Kondor
- Kuhsar
- Liski
- Mabadin-e Olya
- Mabadin-e Sofla
- Mahani
- Mahizard
- Mansurabad
- Masudi
- Mohammadabad
- Molowghan
- Omri
- Owlang
- Qasemi
- Rezvan
- Rud Darreh
- Sangan
- Sayeh Sangan
- Senji-ye Olya
- Shurabad
- Soreykhan-e Sofla
- Sulakhan
- Toros Ab
- Zaghu
- Zangui
- Zeynabad
- Zohri
