= Sardaran District =

District in South Khorasan province, Iran

Sardaran District Persian: بخش سرداران
- District
- Location within Iran
- Coordinates: 32°07′N 59°45′E
- Country: Iran
- Province: South Khorasan
- County: Nehbandan
- Established: 2020
- Capital: Dehak
- Time zone: UTC+3:30 (IRST)

Sardaran District (Persian: بخش سرداران) is in Nehbandan County, South Khorasan province, Iran. Its capital is the village of Dehak, whose population at the time of the 2016 National Census was 826 in 243 households.

== History ==
In 2020, Arabkhaneh Rural District was separated from Shusef District in the formation of Sardaran District.

== Demographics ==
=== Administrative divisions ===
Sardaran District
Administrative Divisions
Arabkhaneh RD
Sahlabad RD
Seyedal RD
RD = Rural District
