= Shusef District =

District in South Khorasan province, Iran

Shusef District Persian: بخش شوسف
- District
- Location within Iran
- Coordinates: 31°51′N 60°20′E
- Country: Iran
- Province: South Khorasan
- County: Nehbandan
- Capital: Shusef

Population (2016)
  - Total: 12,439
- Time zone: UTC+3:30 (IRST)

Shusef District (Persian: بخش شوسف) is in Nehbandan County, South Khorasan province, Iran. Its capital is the city of Shusef.

== History ==
In 2020, Garm-e Tamam Deh Rural District was established in the district, and Arabkhaneh Rural District was separated from it in the formation of Sardaran District.

== Demographics ==
=== Population ===
At the time of the 2006 National Census, the district's population was 14,183 in 3,769 households. The following census in 2011 counted 14,234 people in 4,204 households. The 2016 census measured the population of the district as 12,439 inhabitants in 3,726 households.

=== Administrative divisions ===
Shusef District Population
Administrative Divisions	2006	2011	2016
Arabkhaneh RD (Note: Transferred to Sardaran District after the 2016 census)	5,738	5,341	3,872
Garm-e Tamam Deh RD (Note: Established after the 2016 census)			
Shusef RD	6,107	5,883	5,386
Shusef (city)	2,338	3,010	3,181
Total	14,183	14,234	12,439
RD = Rural District
