= Nehbandan County =

County in South Khorasan province, Iran

Nehbandan County Persian: شهرستان نهبندان
- County
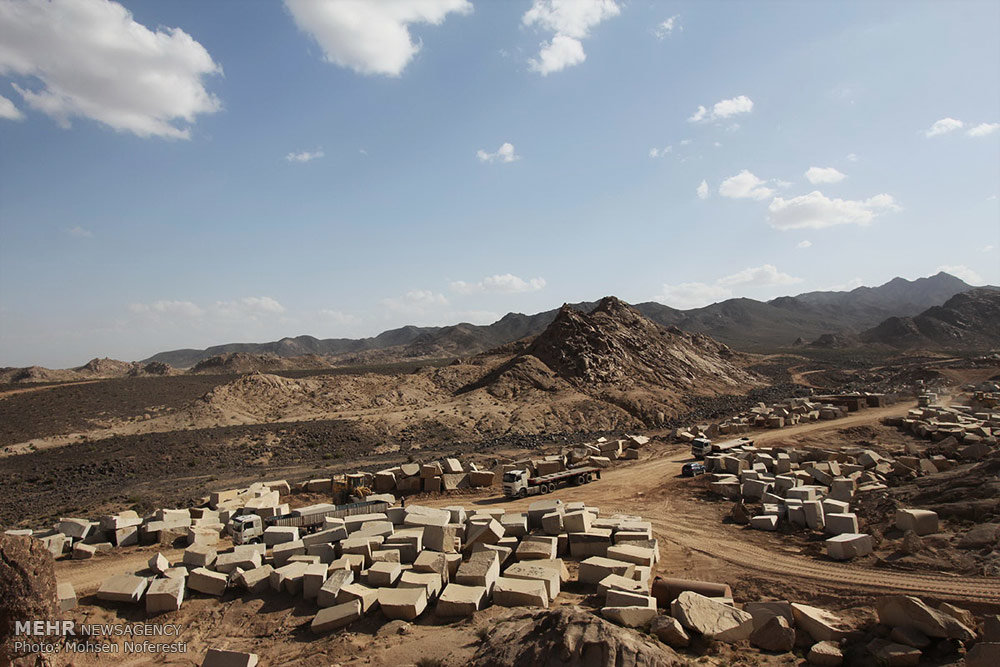
- Granite quarry in Nehbandan County

- Location of Nehbandan County in South Khorasan province (bottom, green)

- Location of South Khorasan province in Iran
- Coordinates: 31°26′N 59°43′E
- Country: Iran
- Province: South Khorasan
- Capital: Nehbandan
- Districts: Central, Sardaran, Shusef

Population (2016)
  - Total: 51,449
- Time zone: UTC+3:30 (IRST)

Nehbandan County (Persian: شهرستان نهبندان) (Note: Also romanized as Nahbandan County and Shahrestān-e Nahbandān) is in South Khorasan province, Iran. Its capital is the city of Nehbandan.

== History ==
In 2020, Garm-e Tamam Deh Rural District was created in Shusef District, and Arabkhaneh Rural District was separated from it in the formation of Sardaran District, including the new Sahlabad and Seyedal Rural Districts.

== Demographics ==
=== Population ===
At the time of the 2006 National Census, the county's population was 56,089, in 13,541 households. The following census in 2011 counted 57,258 people in 15,025 households. The 2016 census measured the population of the county as 51,449 in 14,185 households.

=== Administrative divisions ===
Nehbandan County's population history and administrative structure over three consecutive censuses are shown in the following table.

Nehbandan County Population
Administrative Divisions	2006	2011	2016
Central District	41,906	42,979	39,010
Bandan RD	9,494	7,693	6,736
Meyghan RD	4,936	4,026	3,614
Neh RD	11,478	12,433	10,356
Nehbandan (city)	15,998	18,827	18,304
Sardaran District (Note: Established after the 2016 census)			
Arabkhaneh RD			
Sahlabad RD			
Seyedal RD			
Shusef District	14,183	14,234	12,439
Arabkhaneh RD	5,738	5,341	3,872
Garm-e Tamam Deh RD			
Shusef RD	6,107	5,883	5,386
Shusef (city)	2,338	3,010	3,181
Total	56,089	57,258	51,449
RD = Rural District

== See also ==
Media related to Nehbandan County at Wikimedia Commons
