= Khorramabad (disambiguation) =

Khorramabad is the capital of Lorestan Province, Iran.

Khorramabad (Persian: خرم اباد) and other transliterations (Khurramobod, Horramobod, Xurremabad, etc.) may also refer to:

== Alborz Province ==
- Khorramabad, Alborz, a village in Nazarabad County
- Khorramabad, Karaj, a village in Karaj County

== Ardabil Province ==
- Khorramabad, Ardabil, a village in Meshgin Shahr County

== East Azerbaijan Province ==
- Khorramabad, East Azerbaijan, a village in Ahar County

== Fars Province ==
- Khorramabad, Jahrom, a village in Jahrom County
- Khorramabad, Kharameh, a village in Kharameh County

== Gilan Province ==
- Khorramabad, Gilan, a village in Shaft County

== Golestan Province ==
- Khorramabad, Golestan, a village in Kordkuy County

== Hamadan Province ==
- Khorramabad, Hamadan, a village in Malayer County, Hamadan Province, Iran

== Isfahan Province ==
- Khorramabad, Ardestan, a village in Ardestan County
- Khorramabad, Jolgeh, a village in Isfahan County
- Khorramabad, Mobarakeh, a village in Mobarakeh County

== Kerman Province ==
- Khorramabad, Arzuiyeh, a village in Arzuiyeh County
- Khorramabad, Rafsanjan, a village in Rafsanjan County

== Kermanshah Province ==
- Khorramabad-e Olya, Kermanshah, a village in Ravansar County
- Khorramabad-e Sofla, Kermanshah, a village in Ravansar County

== Kurdistan Province ==
- Khorramabad, Kurdistan, a village in Bijar County

== Lorestan Province ==
- Khorramabad, a city; capital of the province and of Khorramabad County
- Khorramabad County, an administrative subdivision of Lorestan province, Iran
- Khorramabad Airport

== Markazi Province ==
- Khorramabad, Arak, a village in Arak County
- Khorramabad, Saveh, a village in Saveh County
- Khorramabad, Nowbaran, a village in Saveh County
- Khorramabad-e Laqu, a village in Zarandieh County

== Mazandaran Province ==
- Khorramabad, Mazandaran, a city in Mazandaran Province, Iran
- Khorramabad, Nur, a village in Nur County
- Khorramabad, Sari, a village in Sari County
- Khorramabad, Dodangeh, a village in Sari County
- Khorramabad District, an administrative subdivision of Mazandaran Province, Iran

== North Khorasan Province ==
- Khorramabad, North Khorasan, a village in North Khorasan Province, Iran

== Qazvin Province ==
- Khorramabad, Takestan, a village in Takestan County, Qazvin Province, Iran
- Khorramabad Rural District, an administrative subdivision of Qazvin Province, Iran

== Qom Province ==
- Khorramabad, Qom, a village in Qom Province, Iran

== Razavi Khorasan Province ==
- Khorramabad, Bardaskan, a village in Bardaskan County
- Khorramabad, Chenaran, a village in Chenaran County
- Khorramabad, Jowayin, a village in Jowayin County
- Khorramabad, Mashhad, a village in Mashhad County
- Khorramabad, Binalud, a village in Nishapur County
- Khorramabad, Fazl, a village in Nishapur County
- Khorramabad, Torbat-e Jam, a village in Torbat-e Jam County
- Khorramabad-e Olya, Razavi Khorasan, a village in Torbat-e Jam County
- Khorramabad-e Sofla, Razavi Khorasan, a village in Torbat-e Jam County

== South Khorasan Province ==
- Khorramabad, Boshruyeh, a village in Boshruyeh County
- Khorramabad, Qaen, a village in Qaen County

== West Azerbaijan Province ==
- Khorramabad, Urmia, a village in Urmia County
- Khorramabad, Anzal, a village in Urmia County

== Yazd Province ==
- Khorramabad, Yazd, a village in Abarkuh County

== Zanjan Province ==
- Khorramabad Kahriz, a village in Tarom County

== Other ==
- Khorramabadi dialect
- Xurramobod, a village in Uzbekistan
- Khurramobod, Tajikistan, a village in Sughd Region, Tajikistan
- Khurramabad (novel), a 2000 novel by Andrei Volos
