= Shamsabad, Abarkuh =

Shamsabad شمس اباد
- Village
- Location within Iran
- Coordinates: 31°09′36″N 53°20′22″E
- Country: Iran
- Province: Yazd
- County: Abarkuh
- Bakhsh: Central
- Rural District: Tirjerd

Population (2006)
  - Total: 740
- Time zone: UTC+3:30 (IRST)
  - Summer (DST): UTC+4:30 (IRDT)

Shamsabad (Persian: شمس اباد, also Romanized as Shamsābād) is a village in Tirjerd Rural District, in the Central District of Abarkuh County, Yazd province, Iran. At the 2006 census, its population was 740, in 191 families.
