= Azizabad, Abarkuh =

Azizabad عزيزآباد
- Village
- Location within Iran
- Coordinates: 31°06′33″N 53°17′08″E
- Country: Iran
- Province: Yazd
- County: Abarkuh
- Bakhsh: Central
- Rural District: Tirjerd

Population (2006)
  - Total: 583
- Time zone: UTC+3:30 (IRST)
  - Summer (DST): UTC+4:30 (IRDT)

Azizabad (Persian: عزيزآباد, also Romanized as ‘Azīzābād and Azīzābād; also known as Madū’īyeh, Modū’īyeh, Modū’īyeh-ye ‘Azīzābād, and Mūdu) is a village in Tirjerd Rural District, in the Central District of Abarkuh County, Yazd Province, Iran. At the 2006 census, its population was 583, in 166 families.
