= Asadabad-e Bala, Yazd =

Asadabad-e Bala اسدابادبالا
- Village
- Location within Iran
- Coordinates: 31°03′37″N 53°18′28″E
- Country: Iran
- Province: Yazd
- County: Abarkuh
- Bakhsh: Bahman
- Rural District: Mehrabad

Population (2006)
  - Total: 81
- Time zone: UTC+3:30 (IRST)
  - Summer (DST): UTC+4:30 (IRDT)

Asadabad-e Bala (Persian: اسدابادبالا, also Romanized as Asadābād-e Bālā; also known as Asadābād, Asadābād-e ‘Olyā, and Asadābād Kuchik) is a village in Mehrabad Rural District, Bahman District, Abarkuh County, Yazd Province, Iran. At the 2006 census, its population was 81, in 23 families.
