= Feyzabad-e Now =

Feyzabad-e Now فيض ابادنو
- Village
- Location within Iran
- Coordinates: 31°09′24″N 53°21′03″E
- Country: Iran
- Province: Yazd
- County: Abarkuh
- Bakhsh: Central
- Rural District: Tirjerd

Population (2006)
  - Total: 25
- Time zone: UTC+3:30 (IRST)
  - Summer (DST): UTC+4:30 (IRDT)

Feyzabad-e Now (Persian: فيض ابادنو, also Romanized as Feyẕābād-e Now; also known as Feyẕābād-e ‘Olyā) is a village in Tirjerd Rural District, in the Central District of Abarkuh County, Yazd Province, Iran. At the 2006 census, its population was 25, in 8 families.
