= Firuzabad, Abarkuh =

Firuzabad فيروزاباد
- Village
- Location within Iran
- Coordinates: 31°11′15″N 53°12′30″E
- Country: Iran
- Province: Yazd
- County: Abarkuh
- Bakhsh: Central
- Rural District: Tirjerd

Population (2006)
  - Total: 202
- Time zone: UTC+3:30 (IRST)
  - Summer (DST): UTC+4:30 (IRDT)

Firuzabad (Persian: فيروزاباد, also Romanized as Fīrūzābād; also known as Firuz Abad Abarghoo and Fīrūzābād Abrqū) is a village in Tirjerd Rural District, in the Central District of Abarkuh County, Yazd Province, Iran. At the 2006 census, its population was 202, in 57 families.
