= Ahmadabad, Abarkuh =

Ahmadabad احمداباد
- Village
- Location within Iran
- Coordinates: 31°11′39″N 53°12′56″E
- Country: Iran
- Province: Yazd
- County: Abarkuh
- Bakhsh: Central
- Rural District: Tirjerd

Population (2006)
  - Total: 259
- Time zone: UTC+3:30 (IRST)
  - Summer (DST): UTC+4:30 (IRDT)

Ahmadabad (Persian: احمداباد, also Romanized as Aḩmadābād; also known as Ahmad Abad Abarghoo and Aḩmadābād-e Abrqū) is a village in Tirjerd Rural District, in the Central District of Abarkuh County, Yazd Province, Iran. At the 2006 census, its population was 259, in 72 families.
