= Feyzabad-e Kohneh =

Feyzabad-e Kohneh فيض ابادكهنه
- Village
- Location within Iran
- Coordinates: 31°10′29″N 53°21′46″E
- Country: Iran
- Province: Yazd
- County: Abarkuh
- Bakhsh: Central
- Rural District: Tirjerd

Population (2006)
  - Total: 255
- Time zone: UTC+3:30 (IRST)
  - Summer (DST): UTC+4:30 (IRDT)

Feyzabad-e Kohneh (Persian: فيض ابادكهنه, also Romanized as Feyẕābād-e Kohneh and Feyzābād-e Kohneh; also known as Faizābād, Feyẕābād, Feyzābād, and Feyẕābād-e Soflá) is a village in Tirjerd Rural District, in the Central District of Abarkuh County, Yazd province, Iran. At the 2006 census, its population was 255, in 68 families.
