= Hoseynabad, Abarkuh =

Hoseynabad حسين اباد
- Village
- Location within Iran
- Coordinates: 31°04′48″N 53°19′53″E
- Country: Iran
- Province: Yazd
- County: Abarkuh
- Bakhsh: Bahman
- Rural District: Mehrabad

Population (2006)
  - Total: 289
- Time zone: UTC+3:30 (IRST)
  - Summer (DST): UTC+4:30 (IRDT)

Hoseynabad (Persian: حسين اباد, also Romanized as Ḩoseynābād; also known as Hosein Abad Abarghoo, Ḩoseynābād-e Abrqū, and Husainābād) is a village in Mehrabad Rural District, Bahman District, Abarkuh County, Yazd Province, Iran. At the 2006 census, its population was 289, in 83 families.
