= Shahrabad, Abarkuh =

Shahrabad شهراباد
- Village
- Location within Iran
- Coordinates: 31°05′23″N 53°18′21″E
- Country: Iran
- Province: Yazd
- County: Abarkuh
- Bakhsh: Bahman
- Rural District: Mehrabad

Population (2006)
  - Total: 245
- Time zone: UTC+3:30 (IRST)
  - Summer (DST): UTC+4:30 (IRDT)

Shahrabad (Persian: شهراباد, also romanized as Shahrābād) is a village in Mehrabad Rural District, Bahman District, Abarkuh County, Yazd Province, Iran. At the 2006 census, its population was 245, in 87 families.
