= Reisabad =

Reisabad or Raisabad (Persian: رييس اباد) may refer to:

- Reisabad, Eslamiyeh, Kerman Province
- Raisabad, Khenaman, Kerman Province
- Raisabad, Mazandaran
- Raisabad, Yazd
