= Tizak =

Tizak is the name of two distinct villages.

- Tizak, Iran
- Tizak, Afghanistan
