= HEK =

Hek or HEK may refer to:

== People ==
- Alexander Laloo Hek, Indian 21st century politician
- František Vladislav Hek (1769–1847), Czech writer
- Hek Wakefield (1899–1962), American football player
- Hugh Keough (1864–1912), American sports journalist
- van 't Hek, a Dutch surname

== Places ==
- Hek, West Azerbaijan, Iran, a village
- Hek, Yazd, Iran, a village

== Acronym ==
- Halo Editing Kit, a software development kit
- HEK cell (human embryonic kidney cell), a cell line used for transfection experiments
- Hunsrück-Eifel culture (German: Hunsrück-Eifel-Kultur), an Iron Age cultural group of what is now western Germany
- Hunt for Exomoons with Kepler, an exoplanet search program

== Other uses ==
- HEK, IATA code for Heihe Aihui Airport, Heilongjiang Province, China
- Hektoen enteric agar, a microbial agent
- Councilor Vay Hek, an officer of the Grineer Empire in the online game Warframe
