= Khorramabad, Yazd =

Khorramabad خرم اباد
- Village
- Location within Iran
- Coordinates: 30°59′35″N 53°23′32″E
- Country: Iran
- Province: Yazd
- County: Abarkuh
- Bakhsh: Bahman
- Rural District: Esfandar

Population (2006)
  - Total: 756
- Time zone: UTC+3:30 (IRST)
  - Summer (DST): UTC+4:30 (IRDT)

Khorramabad (Persian: خرم اباد, also Romanized as Khorramābād; also known as Khurramābād) is a village in Esfandar Rural District, Bahman District, Abarkuh County, Yazd Province, Iran. At the 2006 census, its population was 756, in 223 families.
