= Raisabad, Yazd =

Raisabad رييس اباد
- Village
- Location within Iran
- Coordinates: 31°09′54″N 53°20′34″E
- Country: Iran
- Province: Yazd
- County: Abarkuh
- Bakhsh: Central
- Rural District: Tirjerd

Population (2006)
  - Total: 481
- Time zone: UTC+3:30 (IRST)
  - Summer (DST): UTC+4:30 (IRDT)

Raisabad (Persian: رييس اباد, also Romanized as Ra’īsābād) is a village in Tirjerd Rural District, in the Central District of Abarkuh County, Yazd Province, Iran. At the 2006 census, its population was 481, in 123 families.
