= Mehran Fatemi =

Iranian politician (born 1978)

Governor-general of Yazd
- In office 26 September 2021 – 9 October 2024
- President: Ebrahim Raisi
- Preceded by: Mohammad Ali Talebi
- Succeeded by: Mohammad-Reza Babaei

Personal details
- Born: 1978 (age 47–48) Esfandabad Abarkuh, Iran
- Party: Principlist
- Education: Yazd University

Mehran Fatemi (Persian: مهران فاطمی, born 1978) is an Iranian conservative politician who formerly served as the governor general of Yazd Province from 2021 to 2024.

== Early life and education ==
Fatemi was born in Esfandabad in the Yazd province in 1978.He holds a bachelor's degree in Natural Resources Engineering and received a PhD in Meteorology (Climate Hazards) from Yazd university.
