= Maryamabad, Yazd =

Village in Yazd province, Iran

Maryamabad Persian: مريم اباد
- Village
- Location within Iran
- Coordinates: 31°08′27″N 53°14′31″E
- Country: Iran
- Province: Yazd
- County: Abarkuh
- District: Central
- Rural District: Tirjerd

Population (2016)
  - Total: 1,335
- Time zone: UTC+3:30 (IRST)

Maryamabad (Persian: مريم اباد) (Note: Also romanized as Maryamābād) is a village in Tirjerd Rural District of the Central District of Abarkuh County, Yazd province, Iran.

== Demographics ==
=== Population ===
At the time of the 2006 National Census, the village's population was 1,223 in 325 households. The following census in 2011 counted 1,353 people in 400 households. The 2016 census measured the population of the village as 1,335 people in 412 households. It was the most populous village in its rural district.
