= Bedaf =

Village in Yazd province, Iran

Bedaf Persian: بداف
- Village
- Location within Iran
- Coordinates: 31°00′56″N 53°17′48″E
- Country: Iran
- Province: Yazd
- County: Abarkuh
- District: Bahman
- Rural District: Mehrabad

Population (2016)
  - Total: 1,111
- Time zone: UTC+3:30 (IRST)

Bedaf (Persian: بداف) (Note: Also romanized as Badāf, Bedāf, and Bodāf; also known as Bīdu) is a village in Mehrabad Rural District of Bahman District of Abarkuh County, Yazd province, Iran.

== Demographics ==
=== Population ===
At the time of the 2006 National Census, the village's population was 978 in 266 households. The following census in 2011 counted 1,051 people in 313 households. The 2016 census measured the population of the village as 1,111 people in 313 households. It was the most populous village in its rural district.
