= Hek, Yazd =

Hek هك
- Village
- Location within Iran
- Coordinates: 31°05′12″N 53°18′04″E
- Country: Iran
- Province: Yazd
- County: Abarkuh
- Bakhsh: Bahman
- Rural District: Mehrabad

Population (2006)
  - Total: 145
- Time zone: UTC+3:30 (IRST)
  - Summer (DST): UTC+4:30 (IRDT)

Hek (Persian: هك; also known as Haik, Hech, and Hīk) is a village in Mehrabad Rural District, Bahman District, Abarkuh County, Yazd Province, Iran. At the 2006 census, its population was 145, in 43 families.
