= Haruni, Yazd =

Haruni هاروني
- Village
- Location within Iran
- Coordinates: 30°53′18″N 53°27′21″E
- Country: Iran
- Province: Yazd
- County: Abarkuh
- Bakhsh: Bahman
- Rural District: Esfandar

Population (2006)
  - Total: 469
- Time zone: UTC+3:30 (IRST)
  - Summer (DST): UTC+4:30 (IRDT)

Haruni (Persian: هاروني, also Romanized as Hārūnī; also known as Horūnī) is a village in Esfandar Rural District, Bahman District, Abarkuh County, Yazd Province, Iran. At the 2006 census, its population was 469, in 129 families.
