= Tizuk =

Tizuk تيزوك
- Village
- Location within Iran
- Coordinates: 31°10′18″N 53°10′11″E
- Country: Iran
- Province: Yazd
- County: Abarkuh
- Bakhsh: Central
- Rural District: Tirjerd

Population (2006)
  - Total: 282
- Time zone: UTC+3:30 (IRST)
  - Summer (DST): UTC+4:30 (IRDT)

Tizuk (Persian: تيزوك, also Romanized as Tīzūk and Tizūk; also known as Tīzak) is a village in Tirjerd Rural District, in the Central District of Abarkuh County, Yazd Province, Iran. At the 2006 census, its population was 282, in 81 families.
