= Shahr Asb =

Village in Yazd province, Iran

Shahr Asb Persian: شهراسب
- Village
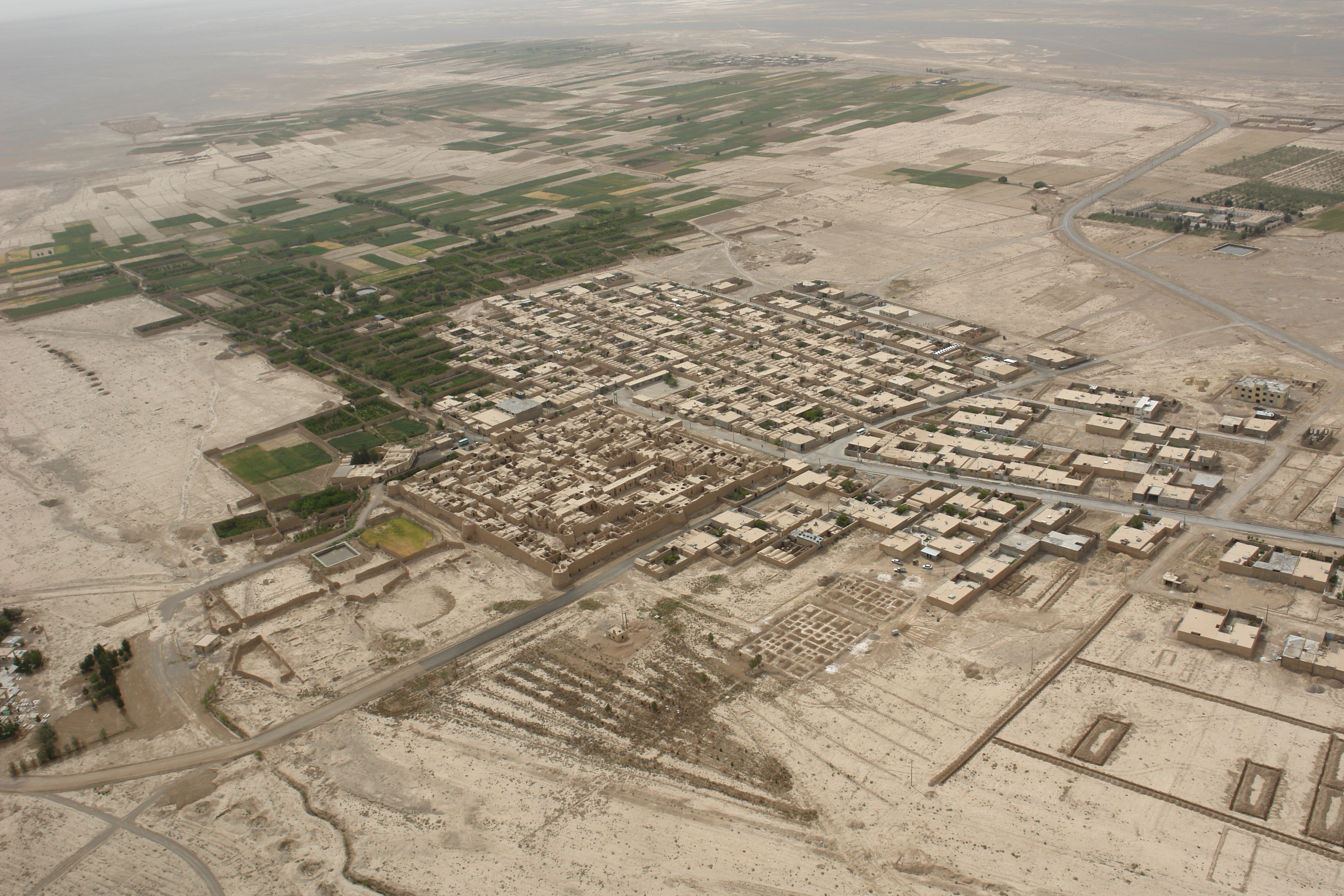
- Aerial view of Shahr Asb in 2009

- Location within Iran
- Coordinates: 31°08′33″N 53°19′52″E
- Country: Iran
- Province: Yazd
- County: Abarkuh
- District: Central
- Rural District: Tirjerd

Population (2016)
  - Total: 585
- Time zone: UTC+3:30 (IRST)

Shahr Asb (Persian: شهراسب) (Note: Also romanized as Shahr Āsb and Shahrasb; also known as Shāh Rasm, Shahrāb, and Shān Rasm) is a village in, and the capital of, Tirjerd Rural District of the Central District of Abarkuh County, Yazd province, Iran.

== Demographics ==
=== Population ===
At the time of the 2006 National Census, the village's population was 618 in 185 households. The following census in 2011 counted 631 people in 207 households. The 2016 census measured the population of the village as 585 people in 194 households.
