= Khorramabad-e Olya =

Khorramabad-e Olya (Persian: خرم اباد عليا) may refer to:

- Khorramabad-e Olya, Kermanshah
- Khorramabad-e Olya, Razavi Khorasan
