= Roknabad Castle =

Castle in Yazd Province, Iran

Roknabad castle
- قلعه رکن‌آباد

General information
- Type: Castle
- Location: Abarkuh County, Iran

Roknabad castle (Persian: قلعه رکن‌آباد) is a historical castle located in Abarkuh County in Yazd Province, The longevity of this fortress dates back to the Qajar dynasty.
