= Esfandabad, Yazd =

Village in Yazd province, Iran

Esfandabad Persian: اسفنداباد
- Village
- Location within Iran
- Coordinates: 30°55′04″N 53°26′06″E
- Country: Iran
- Province: Yazd
- County: Abarkuh
- District: Bahman
- Rural District: Esfandar

Population (2016)
  - Total: 1,449
- Time zone: UTC+3:30 (IRST)

Esfandabad (Persian: اسفنداباد) (Note: Also romanized as Esfandābād; also known as Esbenbad, Esbenbād, and Isfandābād) is a village in, and the capital of, Esfandar Rural District of Bahman District of Abarkuh County, Yazd province, Iran.

== Demographics ==
=== Population ===
At the time of the 2006 National Census, the village's population was 1,385 in 405 households. The following census in 2011 counted 1,442 people in 441 households. The 2016 census measured the population of the village as 1,449 people in 482 households. It was the most populous village in its rural district.
