= Khorramabad-e Sofla =

Khorramabad-e Sofla (Persian: خرم اباد سفلي) may refer to:

- Khorramabad-e Sofla, Kermanshah
- Khorramabad-e Sofla, Razavi Khorasan
