= Shahrasb =

Shahrasb may refer to:

- Shahr Asb, village in Iran
- Shahrasb (Shahnameh), mythical character
