= Haruni Castle =

Castle in Yazd Province, Iran

Haruni castle
- قلعه هارونی

General information
- Type: Castle
- Location: Abarkuh County, Iran

Haruni castle (Persian: قلعه هارونی) is a historical castle located in Abarkuh County in Yazd Province, The longevity of this fortress dates back to the Sasanian Empire.
