= Mehrabad Rural District =

Mehrabad Rural District (Persian: دهستان مهرآباد) may refer to:

- Mehrabad Rural District (Damavand County), Tehran province
- Mehrabad Rural District (Abarkuh County), Yazd province
