= Haruni =

Haruni (Persian: هاروني) may refer to:

- Haruni, Chaharmahal and Bakhtiari
- Haruni, Yazd

== See also ==
Harouni (disambiguation)
