= Mehrdasht =

City in Yazd province, Iran

Mehrdasht Persian: مهردشت
- City
- Location within Iran
- Coordinates: 31°01′31″N 53°20′52″E
- Country: Iran
- Province: Yazd
- County: Abarkuh
- District: Bahman

Population (2016)
  - Total: 8,097
- Time zone: UTC+3:30 (IRST)

Mehrdasht (Persian: مهردشت) (Note: Formerly the village of Mehrabad (مهر آباد), also romanized as Mehrābād; also known as Mehr Abad Abarghoo, Mehrābād-e Abrqū, and Mihrābād) is a city in, and the capital of, Bahman District of Abarkuh County, Yazd province, Iran. It also serves as the administrative center for Mehrabad Rural District.

== Demographics ==
=== Population ===
At the time of the 2006 National Census, the city's population was 7,201 in 1,756 households. The following census in 2011 counted 7,390 people in 1,994 households. The 2016 census measured the population of the city as 8,097 people in 2,338 households.
