= Khoja Ilgor Mosque =

Mosque in Rishtan, Uzbekistan

- Xoʻja Ilgʻor masjidi (Uzbek)
- Interactive map of Khoja Ilgor Mosque
- Location: Fergana Region, Uzbekistan
- Nearest city: Fergana

History
- Built: 1905
- Built for: Mosque

The Khoja Ilgor Mosque (Uzbek: Xoʻja Ilgʻor masjidi) is an architectural monument located in Rishtan (Fergana Region, Uzbekistan). It was built in 1905 and is constructed in the Islamic architectural style. The Hodja Ilgor Mosque is a typical example of the Fergana multi-column, frontally opened cultic building. It is currently a functioning mosque. Presently, it is included in the list of Uzbekistan's nationally significant cultural heritage sites.

== History ==
The Hodja Ilgor Mosque was built in 1905 in Rishtan. The main construction work was carried out by father and son, the craftsmen Eshonkhon and Noribai, commissioned by Shokir Mingbashi. The mosque has a rectangular shape (40x13 meters), and the winter three-column hall is surrounded by a three-sided iwan. The cornice line has a three-step shape, rising towards the central axis where the mihrabs are located. The mihrabs, in the form of lancet niches, are made in the western wall of the hall under the canopy. The faceted column bases are highlighted with geometric shapes, and elements are intricately processed. The harmony and variety of colors and patterns attract attention. Mature trees shade the adjacent area and create a picturesque landscape in which the mosque harmoniously fits. East of the mosque, an artificial reservoir (howz) has been created in the park. The craftsmen paid great attention to the ceiling decoration. The ceiling paintings feature a clear, graphic, well-proportioned design and a rich color palette. The drawing almost completely fills the contours of the architectural element. The ceiling decor employs an extensive range of colors in painting lush vegetative patterns. However, the ceiling paintings primarily use blue, green, and red colors.
