= Khosrowabad Castle =

Iranian national heritage site

Castle of Khosrow abad
- قلعه خسروآباد
- Khosrow abad village, Abarkuh County, Yazd Province in Iran

Site information
- Type: Castle
- Code: 25360
- Owner: Cultural Heritage, Handicrafts and Tourism Organization of Iran

Site history
- Built: Qajar era

Castle of Khosrow abad is an ancient castle built in Qajar era. This castle located in Khosrow abad village, Abarkuh County, Yazd Province.

Castle of Khosrow abad has been registered in List of National monuments of Iran by the ID 25360.

== See also ==
- Castle of Tawseelah
