= Ali Dome =

Mausoleum tower in Yazd province, Iran

- گنبد عالی
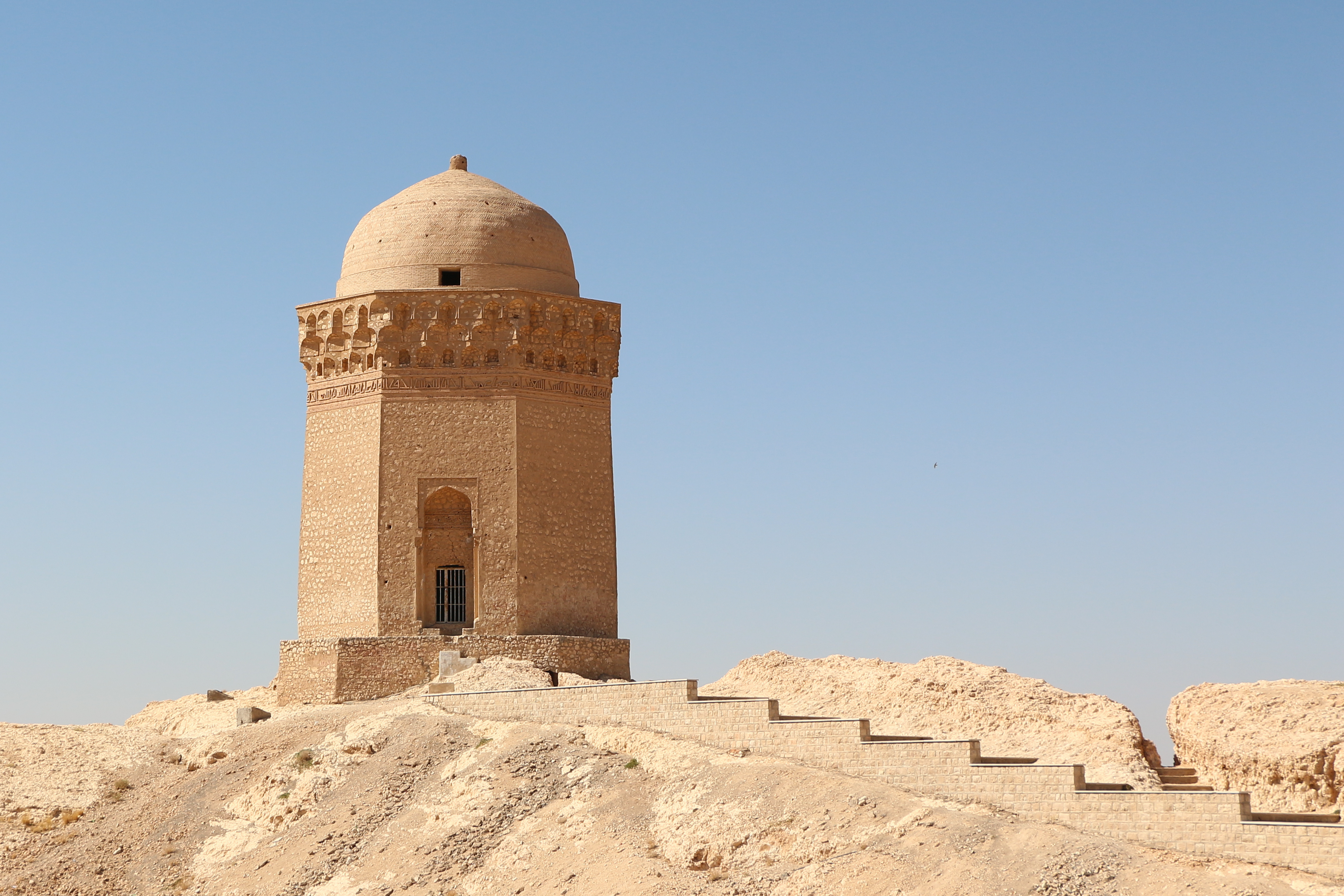
- The mausoleum in 2016

- Location of the mausoleum in Iran

Religion
- Affiliation: Islam
- Ecclesiastical or organisational status: Mausoleum
- Status: Active

Location
- Location: Abarkuh, Yazd province
- Country: Iran
- Interactive map of Ali Dome
- Coordinates: 31°06′53″N 53°18′16″E

Architecture
- Type: Islamic architecture
- Style: Seljuk
- Founder: Firuzan
- Completed: 1056 CE

Specifications
- Dome: One
- Dome height (outer): 22 m (72 ft)
- Dome dia. (outer): 12 m (39 ft)
- Monuments: Two (Ali Hezarasb and his mother)
- Materials: Rubble; mortar; bricks; plaster; lime
- Elevation: 1,546 m (5,072 ft)

Iran National Heritage List
- Official name: Ali Dome
- Type: Mausoleum
- Designated: 1933
- Reference no.: 195
- Conservation organization: Cultural Heritage, Handicrafts and Tourism Organization of Iran

The Ali Dome (Persian: گنبد عالی, romanized: Gonbad-e Ali) (Note: Variously also known as the Ali Tower and the Ali Mausoleum.) is a mausoleum tower located in Abarkuh, in the province of Yazd, Iran. The mausoleum was completed in the Seljuk style in c. 1056 CE on the order of Firuzan, a son of Amir Shams ad-Dowleh ibn Ali Hezarasb, a Daylamite ruler. The mausoleum is the resting place for Ali Hezarasb and his mother.

The mausoleum was added to the Iran National Heritage List on 31 July 1933 and is administered by the Cultural Heritage, Handicrafts and Tourism Organization of Iran.

== Architecture ==
Built at the summit of a small desert hill, the tomb consists of an octagonal chamber that sits on a low base with eight unequal sides and a tall, projecting muqarnas cornice. The four longer sides of the base are coplanar with four sides of the octagonal chamber above. The chamber tapers inward on the exterior so that the structure is wider at the bottom than it is below the cornice. The entrance to the chamber is located on the northeast side of the building. The structure is domed, but the extension of the cornice beyond this dome suggests that it was also capped by a pyramidal roof, as was customary for tombs in this region.

The tomb is constructed almost entirely of rubble masonry with brick used only in the inscriptions and in the construction of the interior dome. The walls are left plain while the cornice and the entrance receive most of the decorative treatment. The cornice of the monument is a three-tier muqarnas, which tapers outward. Below the muqarnas is a band of Kufic inscriptions in Arabic containing the name of the builder and the name of the person to whom it was dedicated.

The entry is set inside a deep niche crowned by a semi-vault and placed within a rectangular outer frame. The entrance is flanked by two columns, of which only the cavities remain. Inside the niche, above the doorway, is another inscription, written in Kufic style that refers to the patron's mother as "seiyyeda", although her full name is not decipherable.

Unlike the tombs in Maragheh, this tomb has no crypt. The interior of the octagonal chamber is bare, and except for the remains of a plaster mihrab, is faced with the same rubble construction seen on the outside. A band of niches, two on each side, decorate the walls below the drum. The transition to the drum is achieved with eight simple squinches located at the corners of the octagon. Four openings in the dome and a window on the side of the chamber illuminate the interior.

== Gallery ==
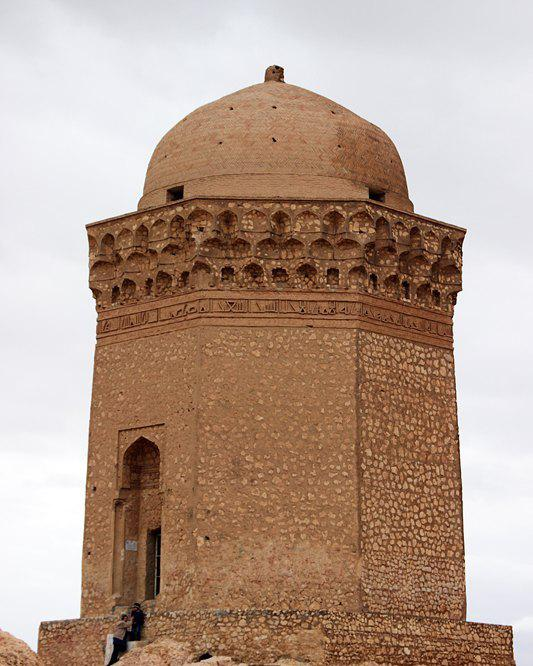

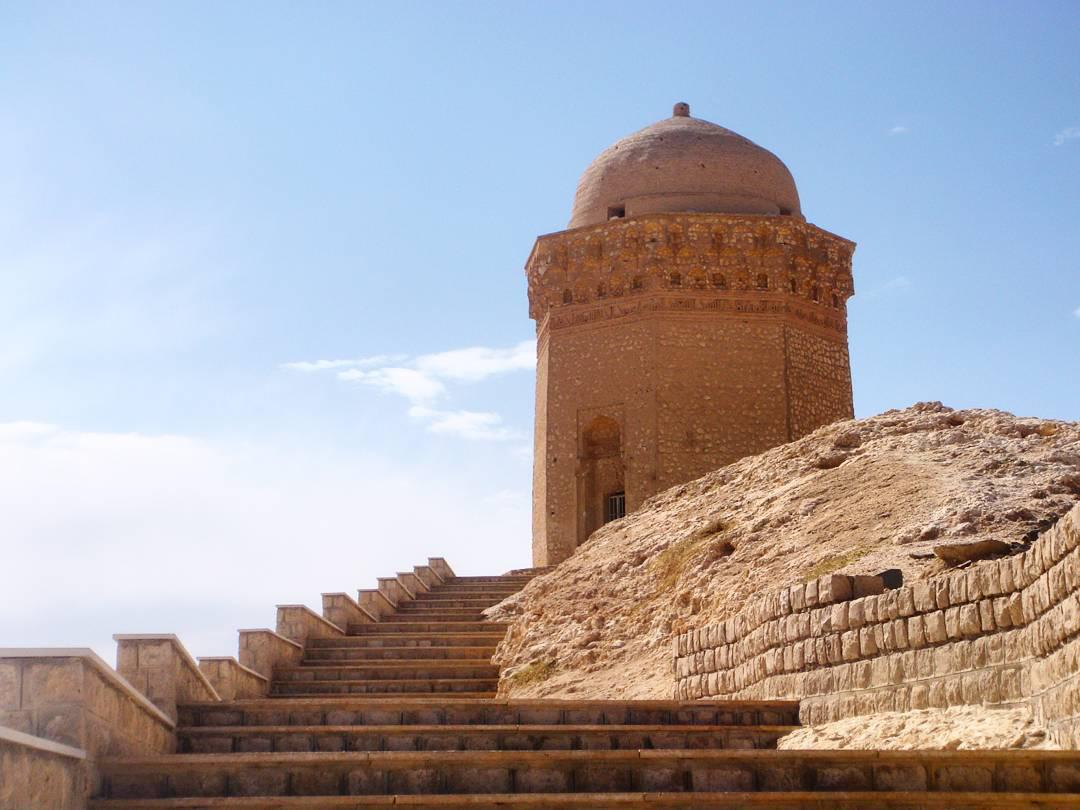

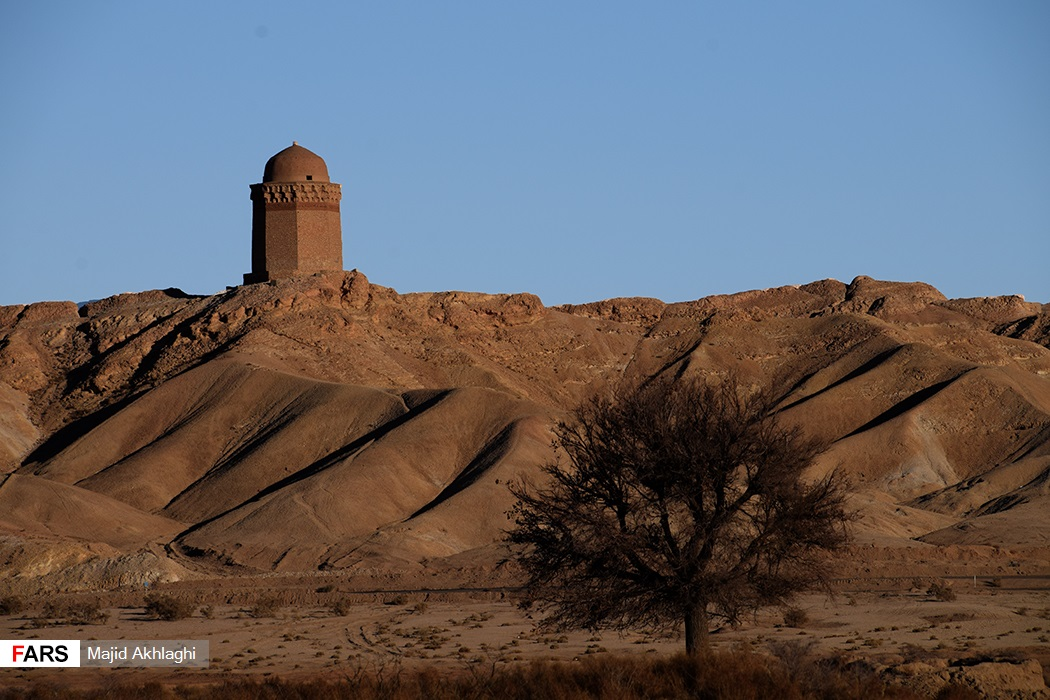

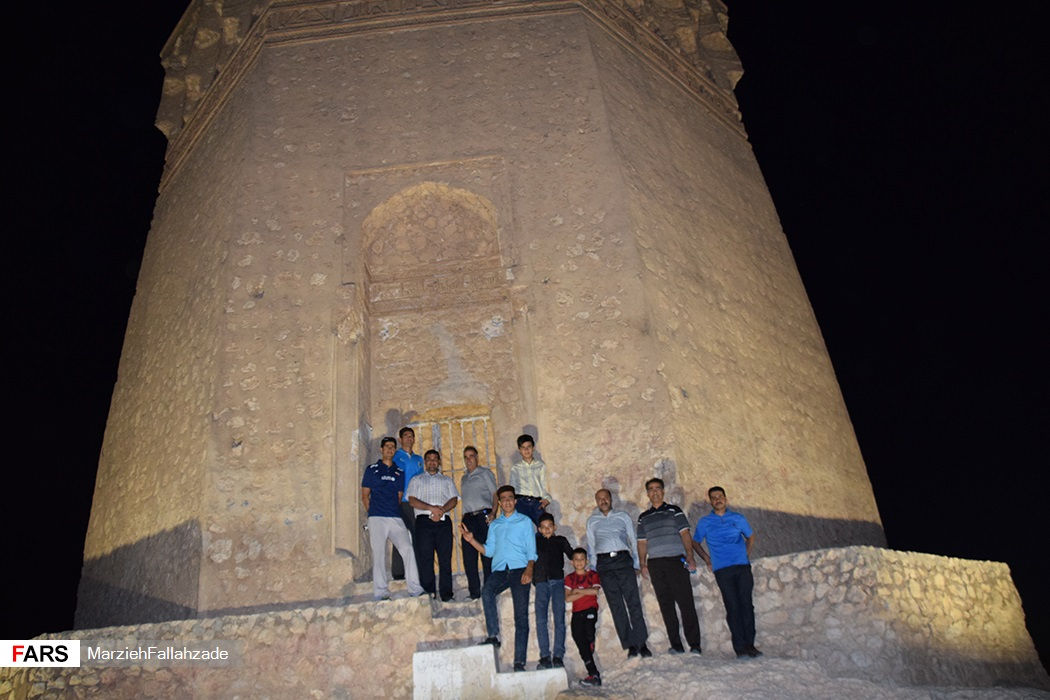

== See also ==
- List of mausoleums in Iran
- List of towers in Iran
- Islam in Iran
