= Harouni =

Harouni is a Persian family name.

== People ==
- Janine Harouni (fl. 2010's) UK based American comedian and actress
- Abdelkarim Harouni (born 17 December 1960) Tunisian politician

== See also ==
- Haruni (disambiguation)
