= Rishton District =

Coordinates: 40.3500°N 71.2833°E

Rishton
- District
- Rishton tumani
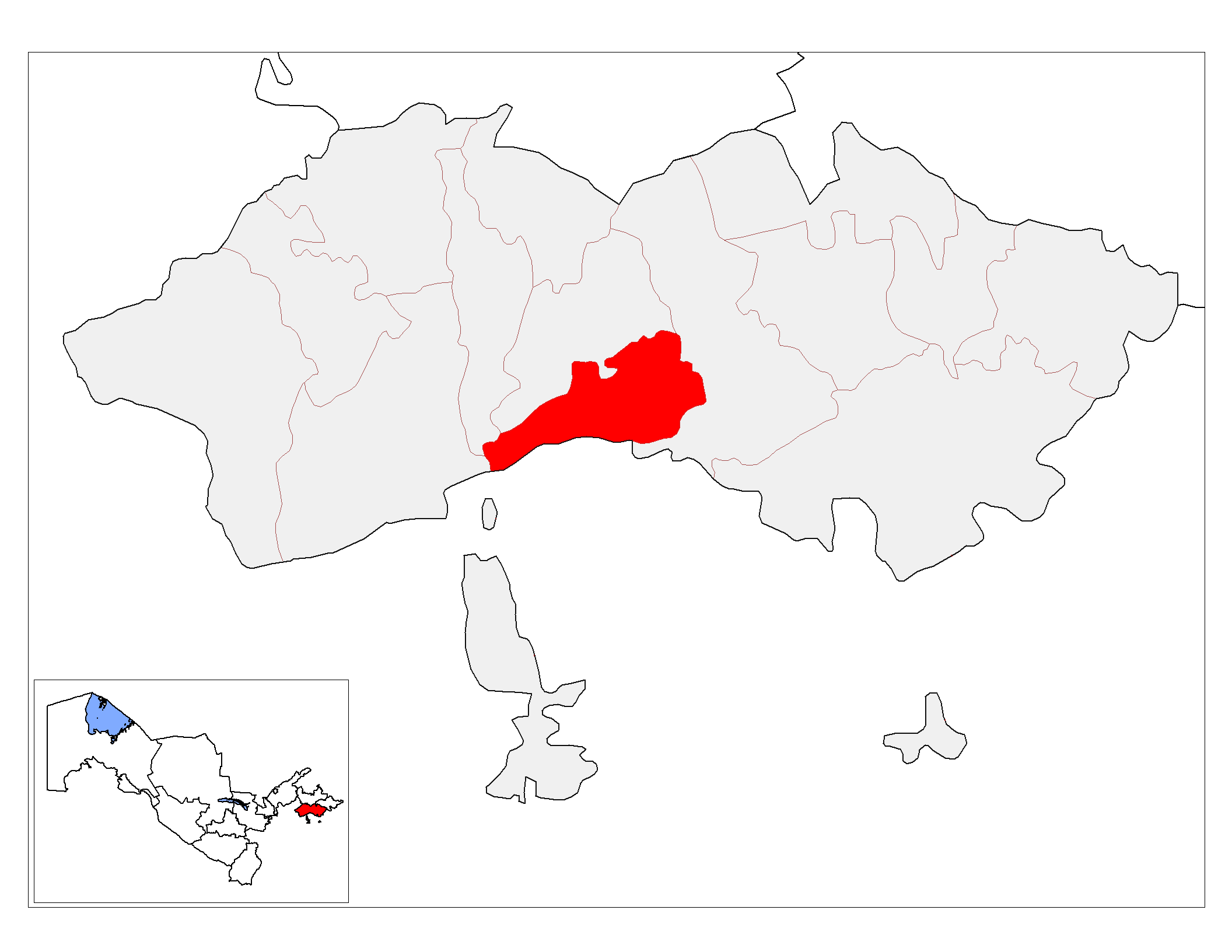
- Country: Uzbekistan
- Region: Fergana Region
- Capital: Rishton
- Established: 1926

Area
  - Total: 310 km^{2} (120 sq mi)

Population (2022)
  - Total: 208,400
  - Density: 670/km^{2} (1,700/sq mi)
- Time zone: UTC+5 (UZT)

Rishton is a district of Fergana Region in Uzbekistan. The capital lies at the city Rishton. It has an area of 310 km^{2} (120 sq mi) and it had 208,400 inhabitants in 2022. The district consists of one city (Rishton), 13 urban-type settlements (Avazboy, Beshkapa, Bujay, Boʻston, Doʻtir, Saxovat, Zoxidon, Qayragʻoch, Oq-yer, Pandigon, Toʻda, Oʻyrat, Xurramobod) and 11 rural communities.
