= Rishton, Uzbekistan =

Rishton Rishton / Риштан
- Location in Uzbekistan
- Coordinates: 40°21′24″N 71°17′05″E
- Country: Uzbekistan
- Region: Fergana Region
- District: Rishton District
- Elevation: 471 m (1,545 ft)

Population (2016)
  - Total: 34,800
- Postal code: 151300
- Website: www.rishton.uz

Rishton (Uzbek: Rishton, Tajik: Рештон, Russian: Риштан, alternatively spelled Rishtan, Rishdan, Roshidon) is a city in Fergana Region, Uzbekistan. It was previously called Kyubishev. It is the administrative center of Rishton District and is located between Kokand and Fergana. It had a population of 34,800 in 2016. Tajik and Uzbek are the most common languages in the area.

== History ==
According to recent studies, the modern Rishton area has been inhabited since the 1st millennium BCE. Saka, Massagetean, and Tocharian groups settled in the middle reaches of what is now Sayxun, and from there, spread to Fergana, Khwarazm, and Zarafshon throughout the 2nd and 3rd centuries CE. These groups' formation from the 1st millennium BCE to the 5th century CE was influenced by Turkic peoples from the north, Persian-speaking tribes from the south of the Amu Darya, and the nomadic Xionites, Kidarites, and Hephthalites.

In 1882, 17,970 people lived in the parish (of whom 4,900 lived in the parish center of Rishtan), and in 1909, 21,811 people lived there (of whom 6,415 lived in the parish center). The population consisted of Uzbeks, Sarts, Tajiks, and Kyrgyz, among others. The number of Russians, according to these data, did not exceed 10 people. Tajiks were the main population of the administrative center of Rishton, Qala e Naw village, and Kashkaryan village (Kashkaryon); the rest of the villages were mainly inhabited by Sarts, Uzbeks, and other various Turkicized Mongolian tribes, Turkicized Persian-speaking indigenous population, etc.

In 1909, Rishtan parish was a part of Bashkir district; 21,811 people lived in the parish. In this table, in addition to the villages of Rishtan parish, there are some villages of Zadiyan parish, which are now part of Rishtan district.

== Arts and culture ==
=== Ceramics ===
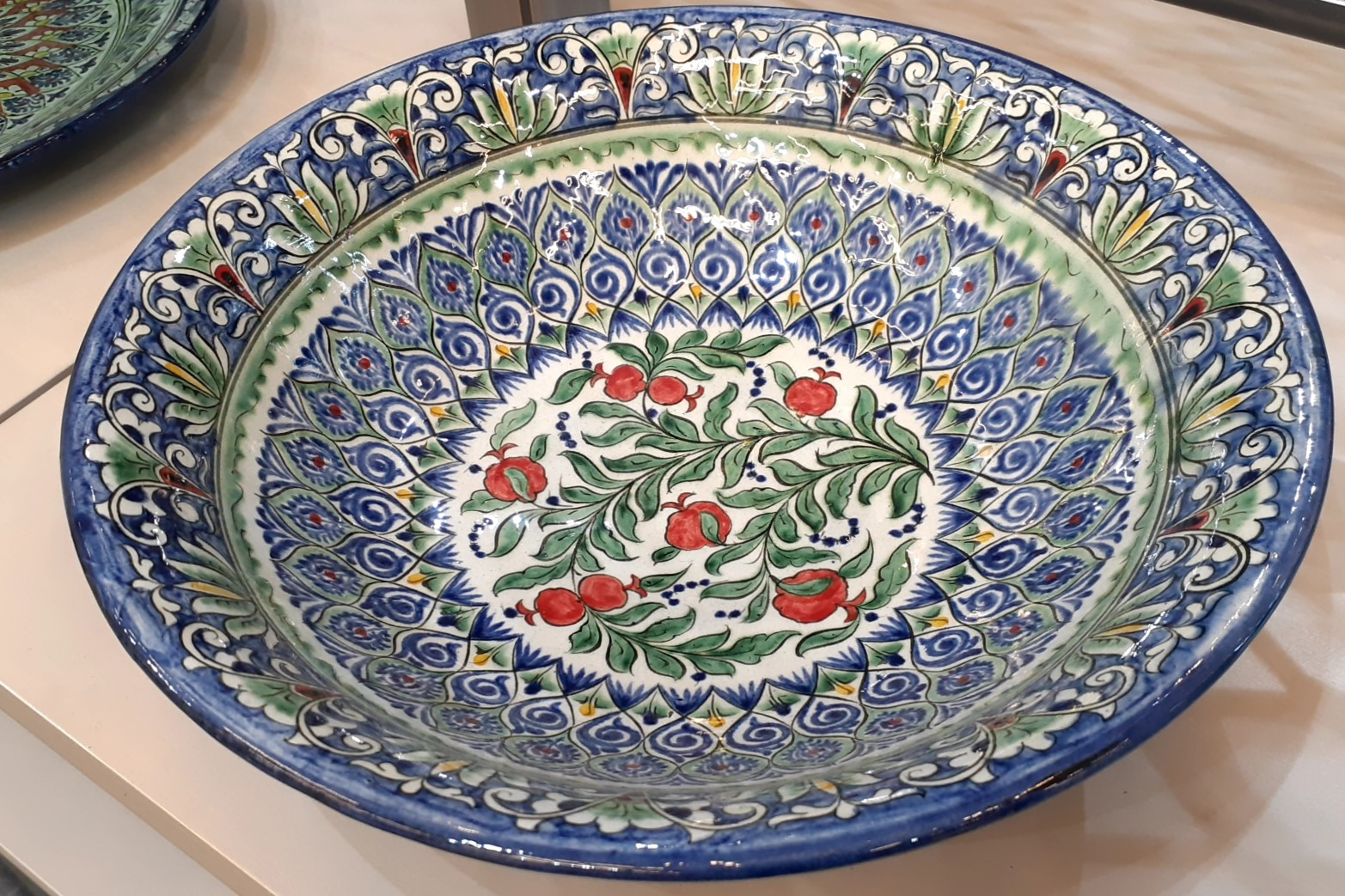
A piece of ceramics from Rishton

Rishton is most famous for, and is one of the oldest centers of, ceramics in Uzbekistan. A fine quality reddish yellow clay deposit 1-1.5 metres deep and 0.5-1.5 metres thick underlies almost the whole Rishton area. The clay can be used without refinement or addition of other types of clay from other regions. Besides clay, the potters of Rishton extracted various dyes, quartz sand, and fire clay from the surrounding mountains. The special "ishkor" blue glaze is manufactured from natural mineral pigments and mountain ash plants. The Khoja Ilgor Mosque was built in 1905 by craftsmen Eshonkhon and Noribai.

=== Heritage sites ===
Khoja Ilgor Mosque is an architectural monument located in Rishtan (Fergana Region, Uzbekistan). It was built in 1905 and was constructed in the Islamic architectural style. The Hodja Ilgor Mosque is a typical example of Fergana's multi-column, frontally-opened cultic buildings. It is currently a functioning mosque. It is included in the list of Uzbekistan's nationally significant cultural heritage sites.

== Notable people ==
Hanafi scholar Burhan al-Din al-Marghinani, the author of the book al-Hidayah, was born in Rishton and grew up in neighbouring Margilan.
