= Van 't Hek =

van 't Hek is a Dutch surname. Notable people with the surname include:

- Tom van 't Hek (born 1958), Dutch field hockey player
- Youp van 't Hek (born 1954), Dutch comedian
