= Khorramabad, Urmia =

Khorramabad خرم اباد
- Village
- Location within Iran
- Coordinates: 37°25′10″N 45°05′01″E
- Country: Iran
- Province: West Azerbaijan
- County: Urmia
- Bakhsh: Central
- Rural District: Baranduz

Population (2006)
  - Total: 253
- Time zone: UTC+3:30 (IRST)
  - Summer (DST): UTC+4:30 (IRDT)

Khorramabad (Persian: خرم اباد, also Romanized as Khorramābād; also known as Khormābād) is a village in Baranduz Rural District, in the Central District of Urmia County, West Azerbaijan Province, Iran. At the 2006 census, its population was 253, in 62 families.
