= Raisabad, Khenaman =

Raisabad رييس اباد
- Village
- Location within Iran
- Coordinates: 30°27′33″N 56°28′03″E
- Country: Iran
- Province: Kerman
- County: Rafsanjan
- Bakhsh: Central
- Rural District: Khenaman

Population (2006)
  - Total: 400
- Time zone: UTC+3:30 (IRST)
  - Summer (DST): UTC+4:30 (IRDT)

Raisabad (Persian: رييس اباد, also Romanized as Ra’īsābād) is a village in Khenaman Rural District, in the Central District of Rafsanjan County, Kerman Province, Iran. At the 2006 census, its population was 400, in 107 families.
