= Khorramabad, East Azerbaijan =

Khorramabad خرم اباد
- Village
- Location within Iran
- Coordinates: 38°23′46″N 46°55′27″E
- Country: Iran
- Province: East Azerbaijan
- County: Ahar
- Bakhsh: Central
- Rural District: Goyjah Bel

Population (2006)
  - Total: 188
- Time zone: UTC+3:30 (IRST)
  - Summer (DST): UTC+4:30 (IRDT)

Khorramabad (Persian: خرم اباد, romanized: Khorramābād) is a village in Goyjah Bel Rural District, in the Central District of Ahar County, East Azerbaijan Province, Iran. At the 2006 census, its population was 188, in 35 families.
