= Khorramabad, Mashhad =

Khorramabad خرماباد
- Village
- Location within Iran
- Coordinates: 36°24′36″N 59°37′21″E
- Country: Iran
- Province: Razavi Khorasan
- County: Mashhad
- Bakhsh: Central
- Rural District: Tabadkan

Population (2006)
  - Total: 335
- Time zone: UTC+3:30 (IRST)
  - Summer (DST): UTC+4:30 (IRDT)

Khorramabad (Persian: خرماباد, also Romanized as Khorramābād) is a village in Tabadkan Rural District, in the Central District of Mashhad County, Razavi Khorasan Province, Iran. At the 2006 census, its population was 335, in 81 families.
