= Khorramabad, Kharameh =

Khorramabad خرم اباد
- Village
- Location within Iran
- Coordinates: 29°36′31″N 53°11′38″E
- Country: Iran
- Province: Fars
- County: Kharameh
- Bakhsh: Central
- Rural District: Dehqanan

Population (2006)
  - Total: 332
- Time zone: UTC+3:30 (IRST)
  - Summer (DST): UTC+4:30 (IRDT)

Khorramabad (Persian: خرم اباد, also Romanized as Khorramābād) is a village in Dehqanan Rural District, in the Central District of Kharameh County, Fars province, Iran. At the 2006 census, its population was 332, in 84 families.
