= Xurramobod =

Uzbek village in Rishton District, Fergana Region

- Location in Uzbekistan
- Coordinates: 40°21′20″N 71°19′30″E
- Country: Uzbekistan
- Region: Fergana Region
- District: Rishton District

Population (2023)
  - Total: 4,000
- Time zone: UTC+5

Xurramobod (Uzbek: Xurramobod, Хуррамобод, Russian: Хуррамабад, romanized: Khurramabad) is an urban-type settlement in Rishton District, in Fergana Region, in Uzbekistan. Its population is 3,000 (2016). It is located about halfway between Kokand and Fergana. It is located at an altitude of 471 meters.

Famous singer Bahodir Mamajonov was born here. Uzbeks, Kyrgyzs and mainly Tajiks have been living in this tiny village for a long time. People from here are known for their hospitality and kindness. Another remarkable point is interconnectedness

An old man and his grandchild

The main language of the village is Tajik, which is similar to the Persian language.
