= Abarkuh =

City in Yazd province, Iran

Abarkuh Persian: ابرکوه
- City
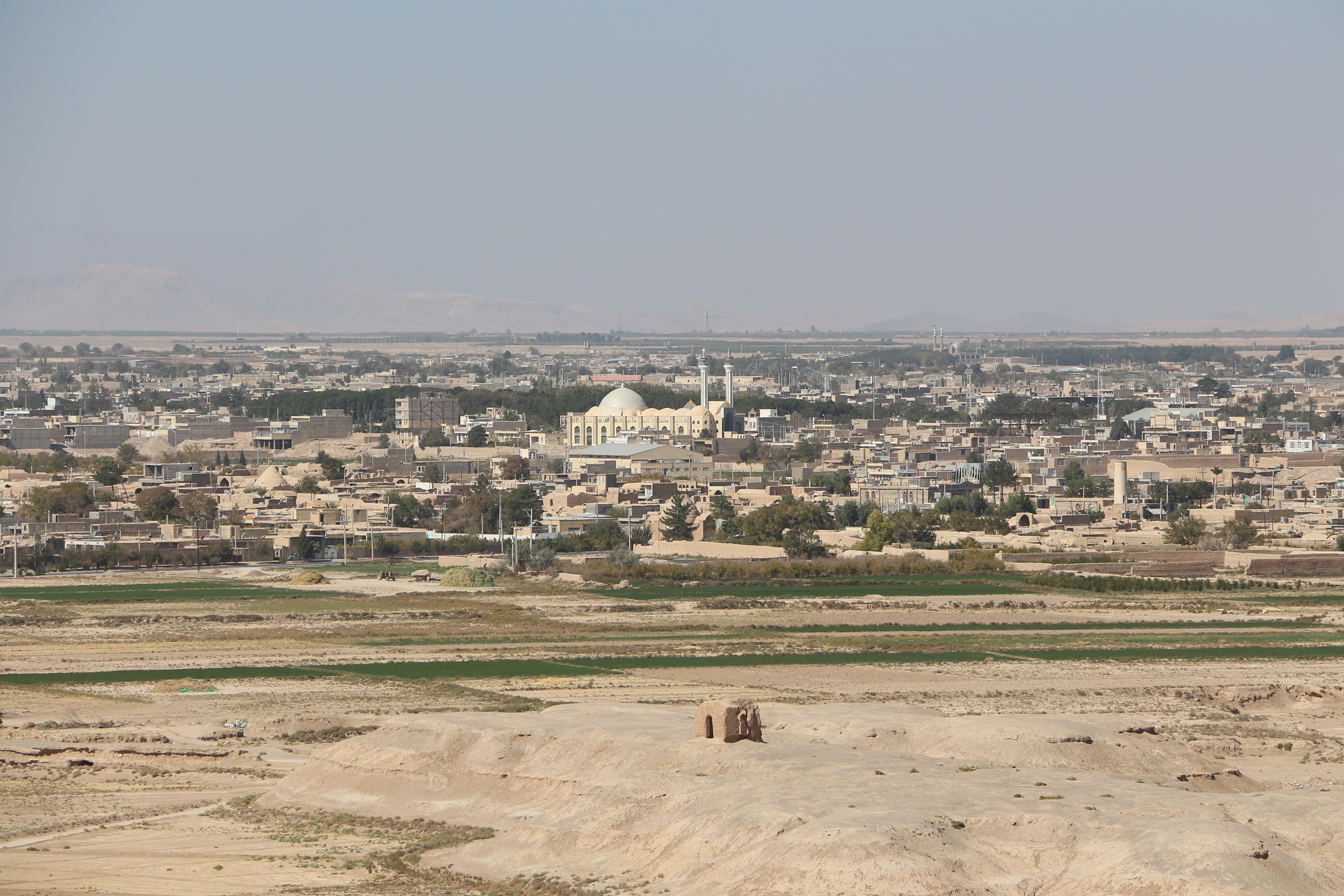
- View of Abarkuh

- Location within Iran
- Coordinates: 31°07′32″N 53°15′45″E
- Country: Iran
- Province: Yazd
- County: Abarkuh
- District: Central

Population (2016)
  - Total: 27,524
- Time zone: UTC+3:30 (IRST)

Abarkuh (Persian: ابركوه) (Note: Also romanized as Abar Kūh and Abarkūh; also known as Abar Qū, Abarghoo, Abarkū, and Abarqūh) is a city in the Central District of Abarkuh County, Yazd province, Iran, serving as capital of both the county and the district.

== Etymology ==
A folk etymology of the name Abarquh, related by Hamdallah Mustawfi in 1340, is from bar kūh, meaning "on the mountain". Mustawfi said that its original site was on a hill, but since then had been moved down to the plain.

== History ==
In the 10th century CE, Abarquh was the spot where the roads from Shiraz, Isfahan, and Yazd converged. During this period, the writer Ibn Hawqal noted that Abarquh was the capital of the nahiyah of Rudan, which had formerly been part of Kerman province but, by the time of his writing, had become part of Fars under the district of Estakhr. The accounts of Ibn Hawqal and his contemporary al-Maqdisi describe Abarquh as a prosperous and populous town, fortified with a citadel. The mishmash of narrow streets formed a compact, spontaneous network, and the houses, like those of Yazd were built of sun-dried brick in a vaulted shape. 10th-century Abarquh had a large Friday mosque, which was a predecessor of the current one, which dates from the post-Mongol period. As the surrounding region was treeless and arid, and thus unable to support much agriculture, Abarquh imported large quantities of food from elsewhere. It exported cotton cloth. A notable feature mentioned by Ibn Hawqal is a "lofty hill of ashes" (possibly a volcanic remnant) said to be the remains of the fire where Namrud tried to burn Abraham to death.

In the following 11th century, Abarquh was ruled by the Kakuyid dynasty, who had originally been kinsmen and vassals of the Buyid dynasty but later became independent rivals. Just before 435 AH (1043-44 CE), the Buyid ruler Abu Kalijar captured Abarquh from the Kakuyid Abu Mansur Faramarz. In 1051, however, Abarquh came back into Abu Mansur Faramarz's possession: that year, the Seljuk ruler Tughril Bey conquered Faramarz's capital of Isfahan, and in compensation granted him the cities of Abarquh and Yazd. Around this time, another notable family in Abarquh was the Firuzanids, originally from Eshkavar in Tabaristan. The oldest surviving structure in Abarquh today, the Gonbad-e Ali, was built in 448 AH (1056/57 CE) for a member of this family named Amid al-Din Shams al-Dawla Abu Ali Hazarasp Firuzani. Another early monument is the Seljuk-era tomb of Pir Hamza Sabzpush.

Abarquh flourished under the Seljuks, as well as under their successors, the Ilkhanids. Most surviving medieval structures in Abarquh today are from the Ilkhanid period, including the Friday mosque with its four ayvans. Abarquh served as a mint town under the Ilkhanids and thereafter; coins minted here under them, the Injuids, the Mozaffarids, the Timurids, and the Aq Qoyunlu all survive. Writing in 1340, Hamdallah Mustawfi describes Abarquh as small but prosperous, with grain and cotton grown here in fields irrigated by both qanats and surface channels. He lists the revenue of Abarquh and its attached rural districts as 140,000 dinars. Mustawfi also mentions the domeless tomb of the renowned scholar Tavus al-Haramayn ("peacock of the two sanctuaries", i.e. Mecca and Medina), who probably lived during the Mongol Empire period. A mausoleum attributed to him still exists in Abarquh, but it is actually the tomb of one Hasan b. Kay Khosrow (d. 718 AH/1318 CE) and his wife.

Safavid Abarquh was part of the crown lands, or maḥāll-e ḵāṣṣa, and, together with Yazd, Biabanak, and other towns in the region, constituted a governorship that was granted out to high court officials. In the early 17th century, the Taḏkerat al-molūk describes the local religious judge (ḥākem-e šaṛʿ) as being appointed by the spiritual leader at the royal court (ṣadr-e ḵaṣṣa), and the district of Abarquh, valued at 711 tomans and 5,300 dinars, was granted to the commander of guard of musketeers (tofanġčī āḡāsī).

Abarquh was ravaged by the invasion of the Afghan Hotak dynasty in the early 1700s. Later, in 1208 AH (1793/94 CE) Lotf Ali Khan Zand captured Abarquh's citadel and held it for a while during the war with the rising Qajar dynasty. During the late Qajar era, Abarquh acquired a reputation for lawlessness and unrest.

== Demographics ==
=== Population ===
At the time of the 2006 National Census, the city's population was 20,994 in 5,880 households. The following census in 2011 counted 23,986 people in 7,039 households. The 2016 census measured the population of the city as 27,524 people in 8,489 households.

== Overview ==
Abarkuh is at an altitude of 1510 metres (4954 feet). An ancient living cypress tree, the Sarv-e Abarkuh, is located here.

The city has 4 adobe ice houses that date back to Qajar era. Adobe ice houses (yakhchāl) are ancient buildings used to store ice and food throughout the year, commonly used prior to the invention of the refrigerator in the past.

== Gallery ==
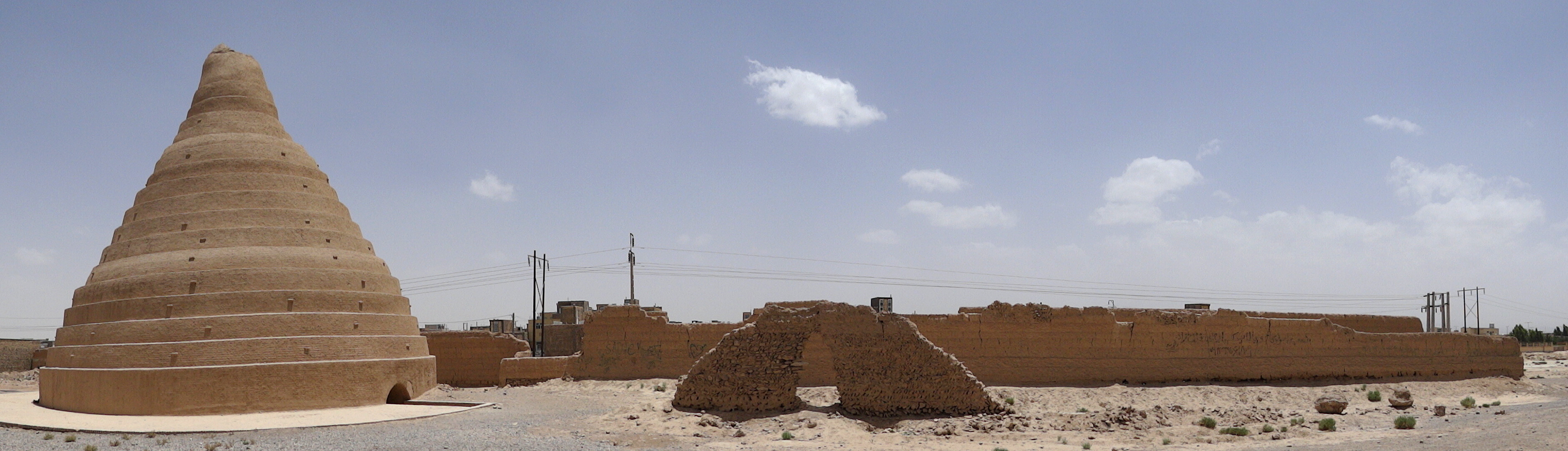
Abarkuh Icehouse

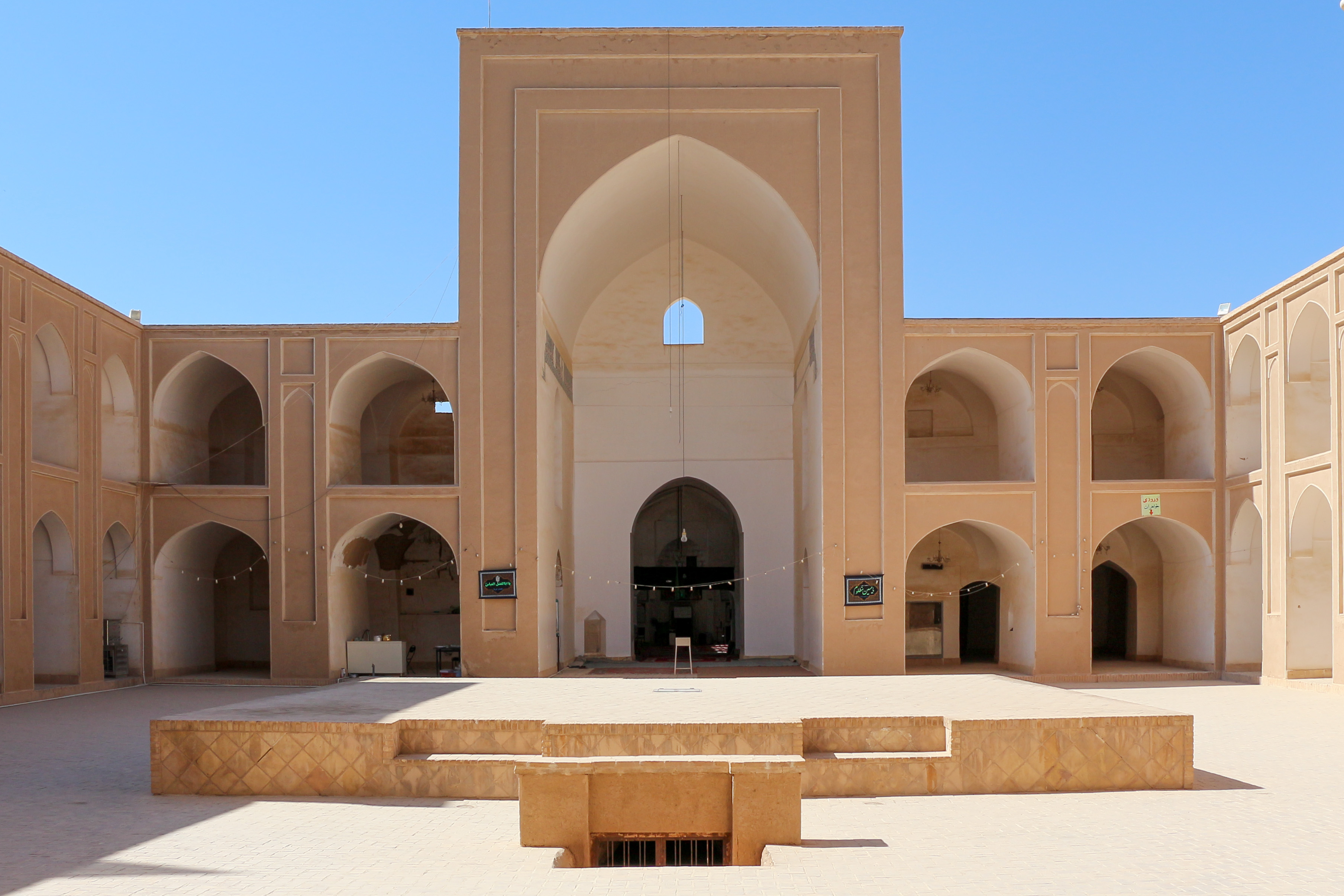
Jameh Mosque of Abarkuh

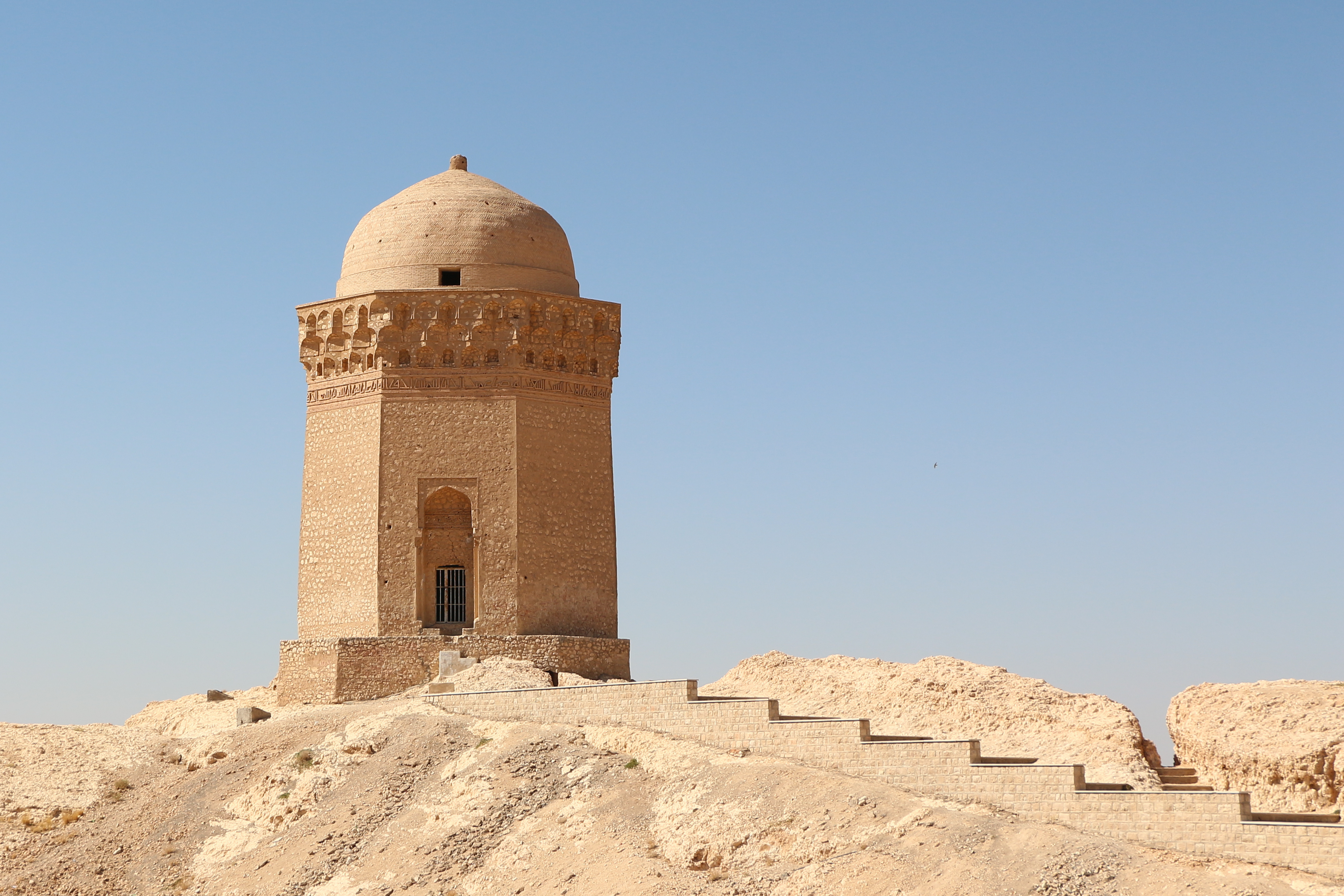
Gonbad-e Ali

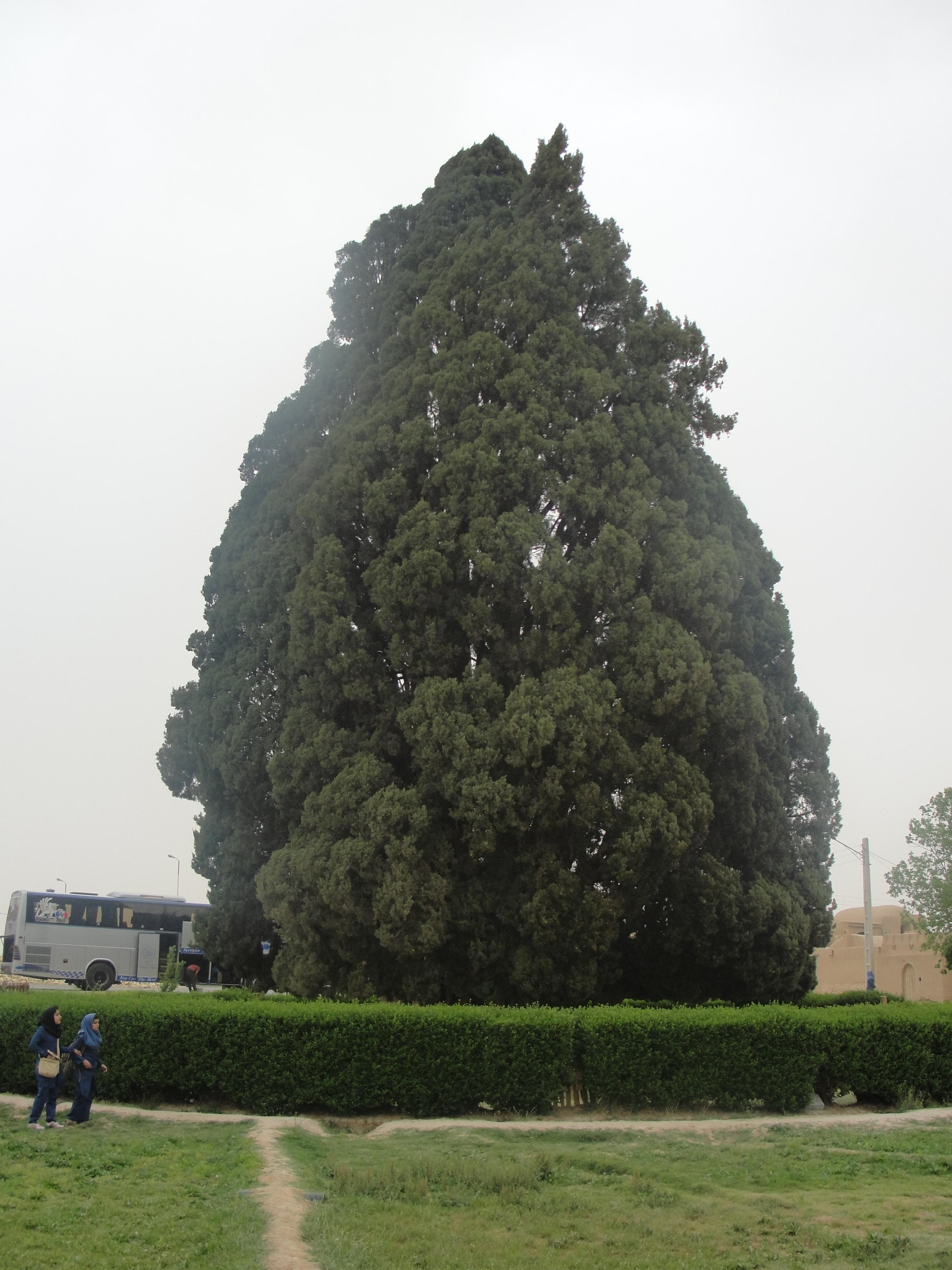
Cypress of Abar-Kuh

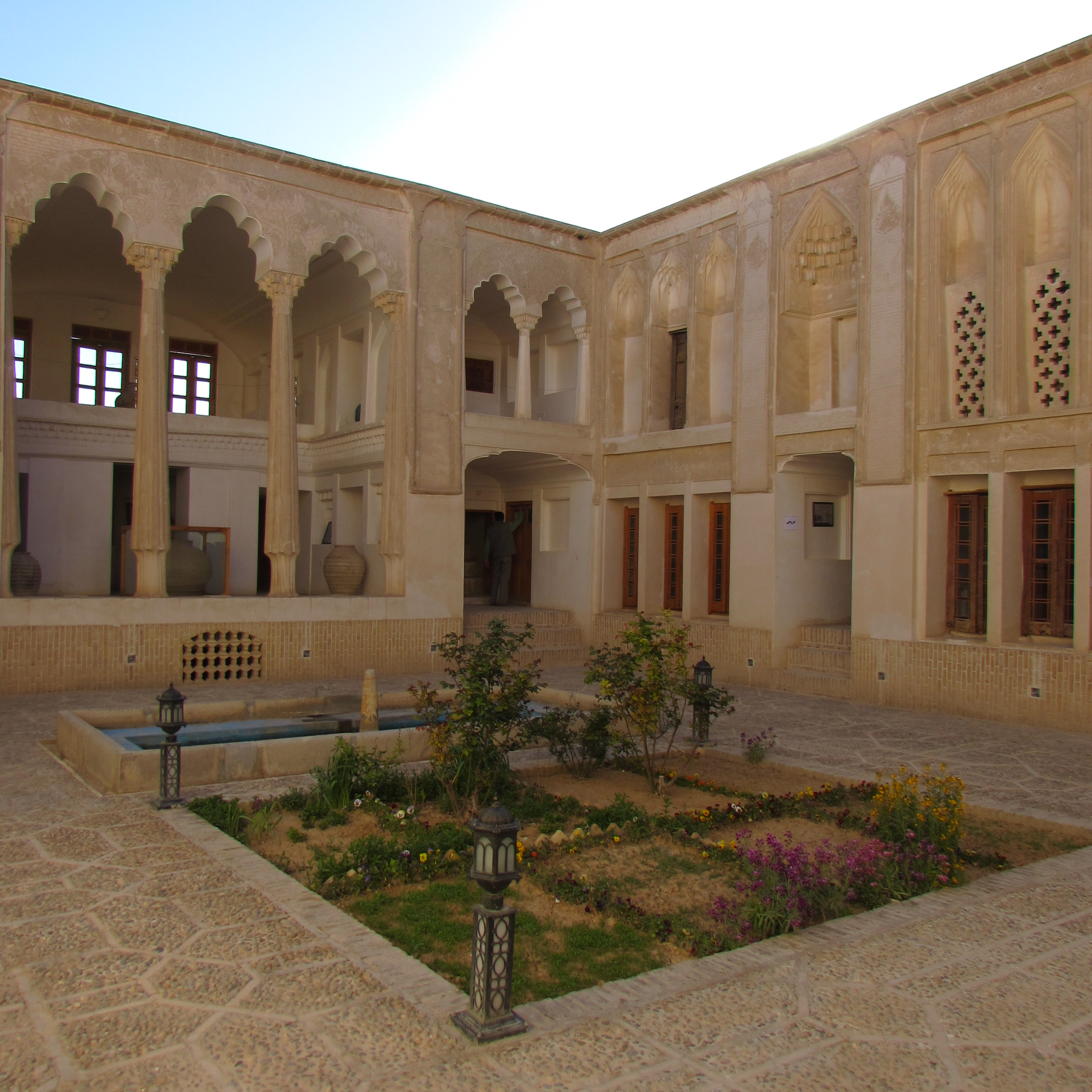
Soult House

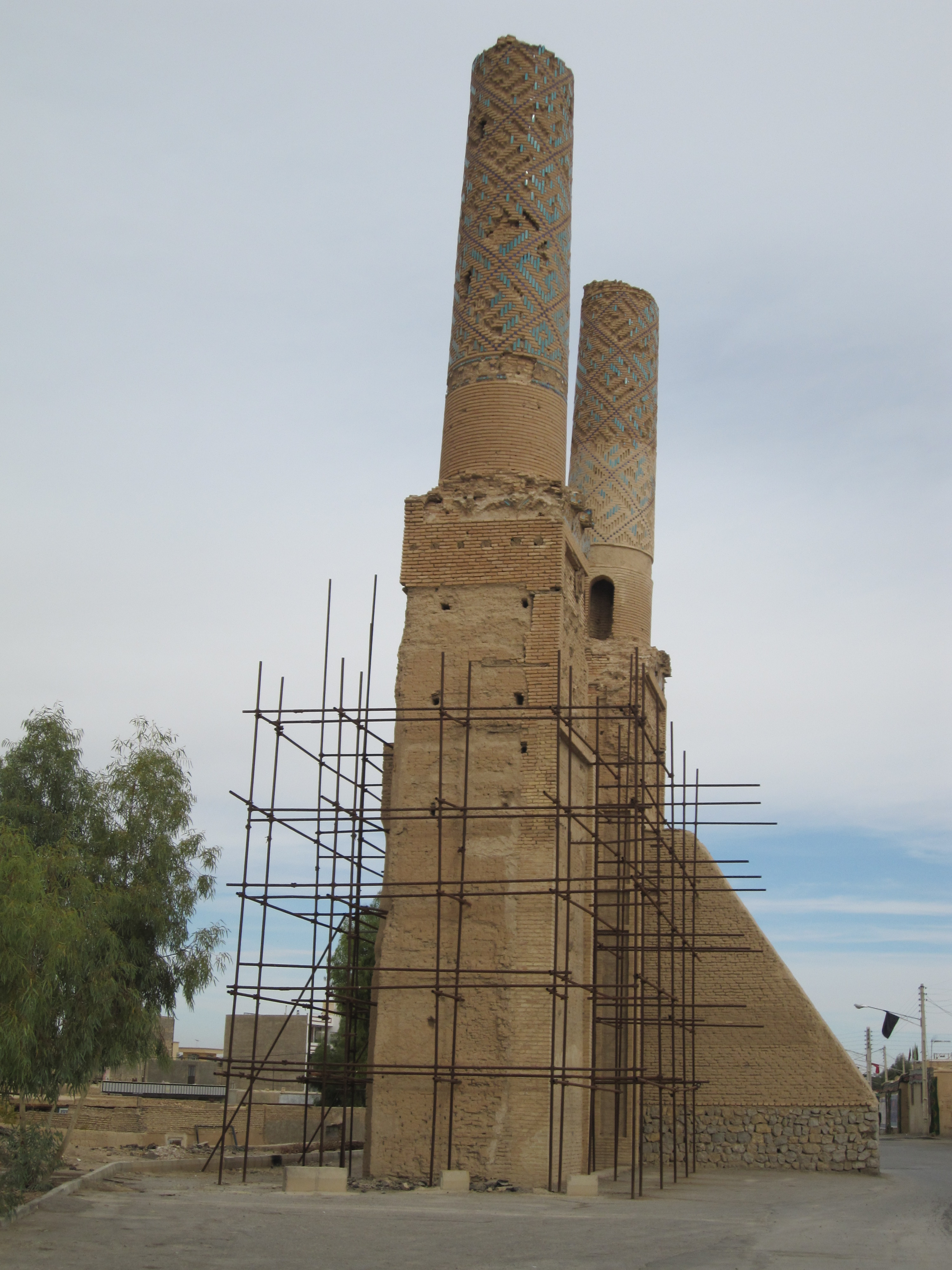
Abarkuh prayer tower

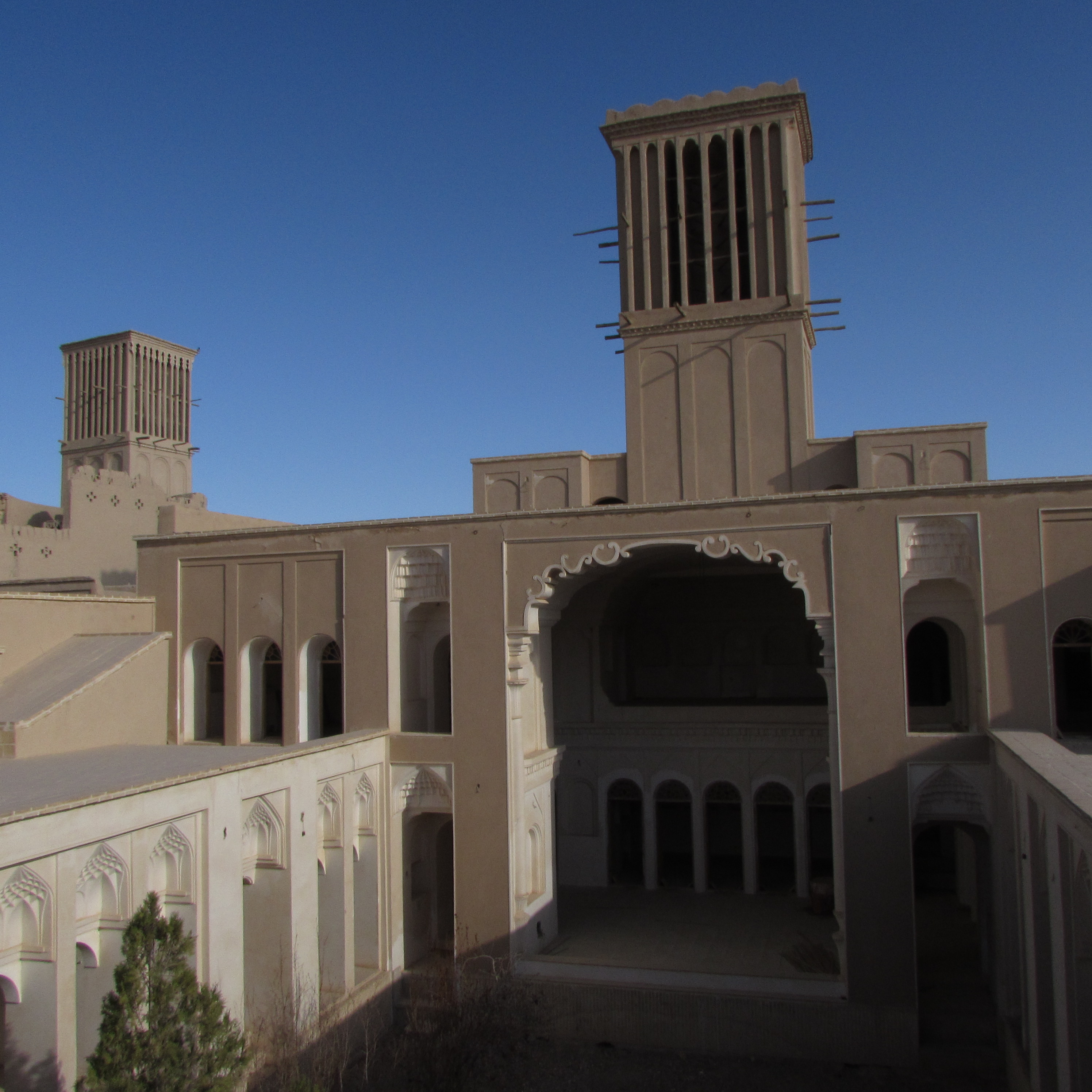
Seyed Ali Agha House

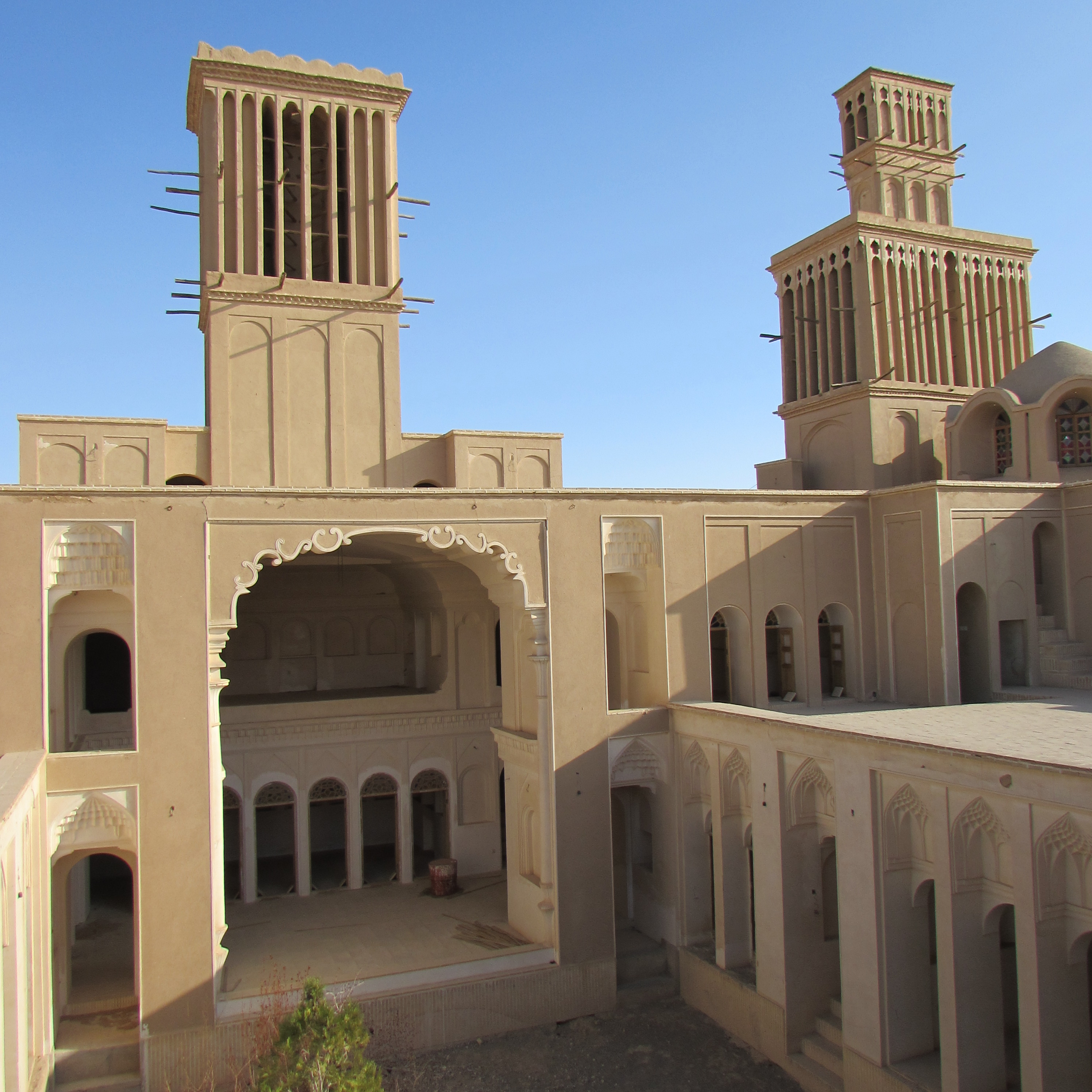
Seyed Ali Agha House

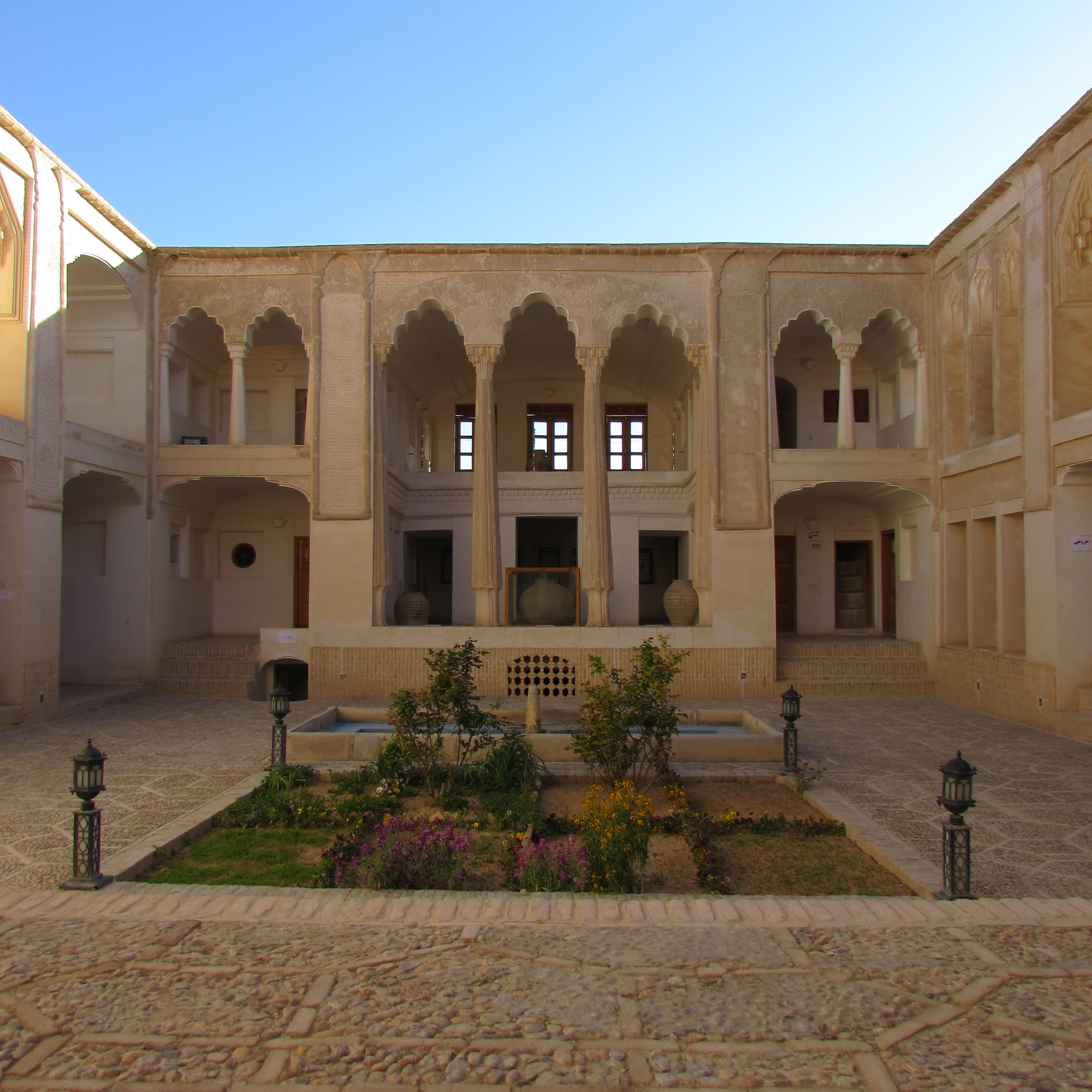
Soult House

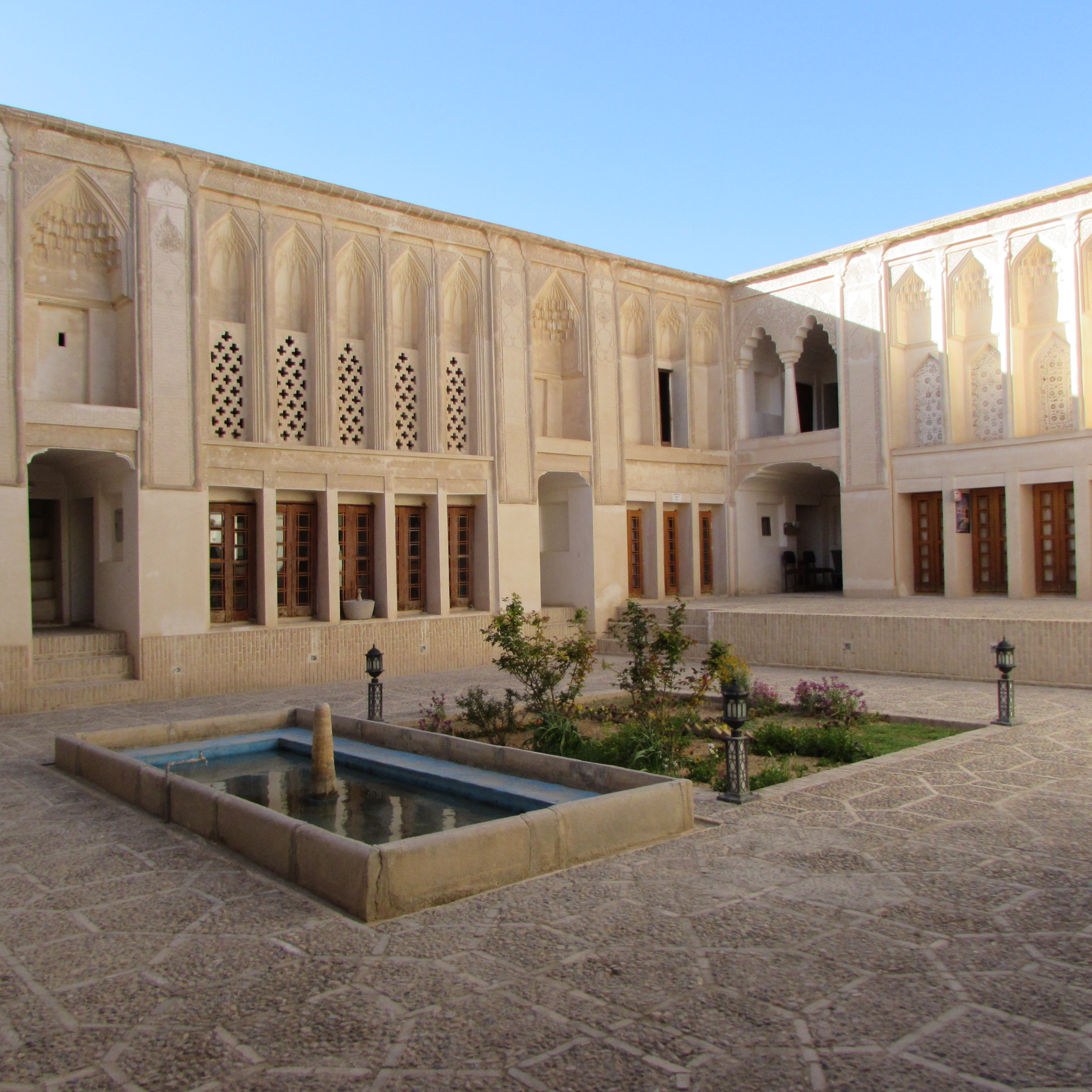
Soult House

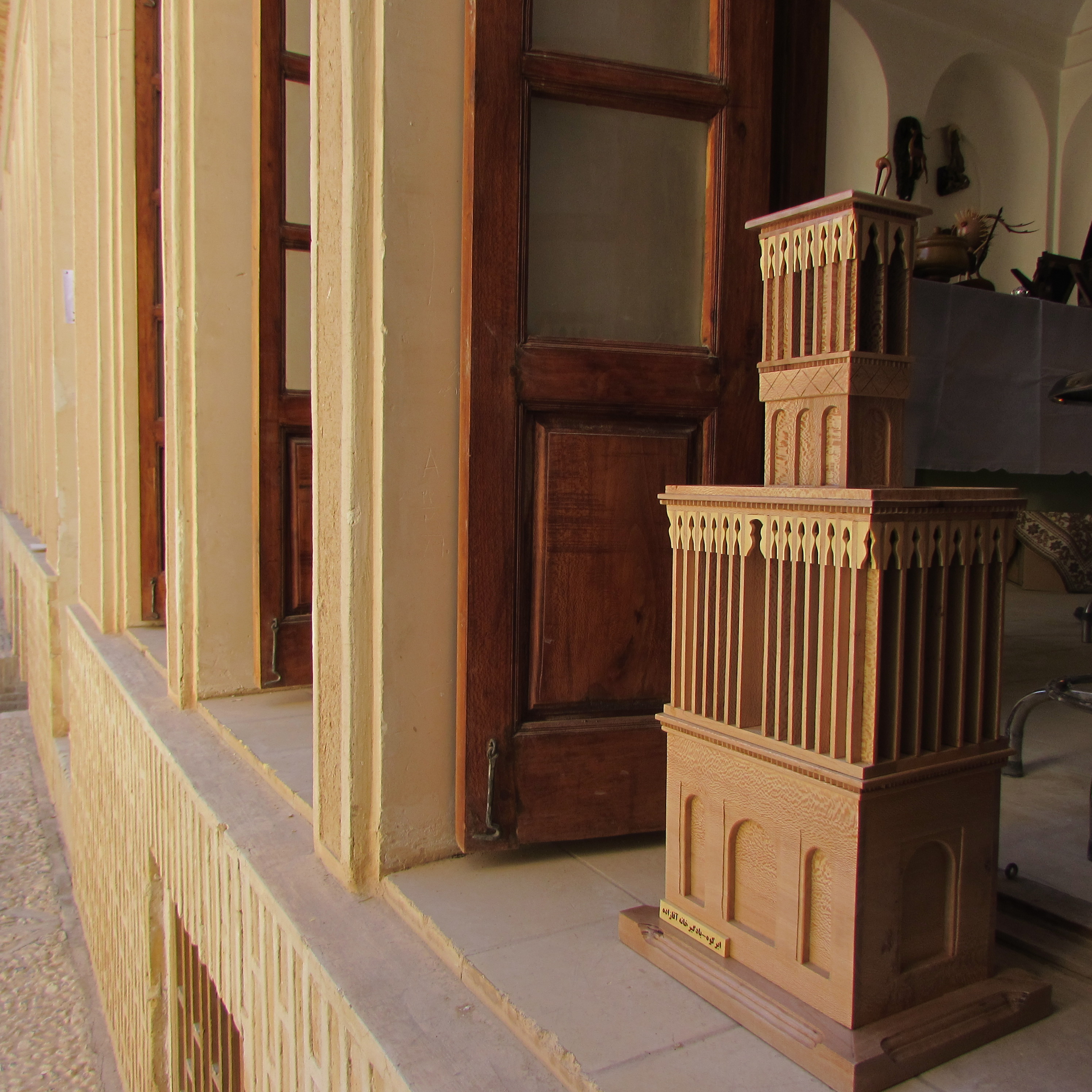
Abarkuh two-floor windscreen

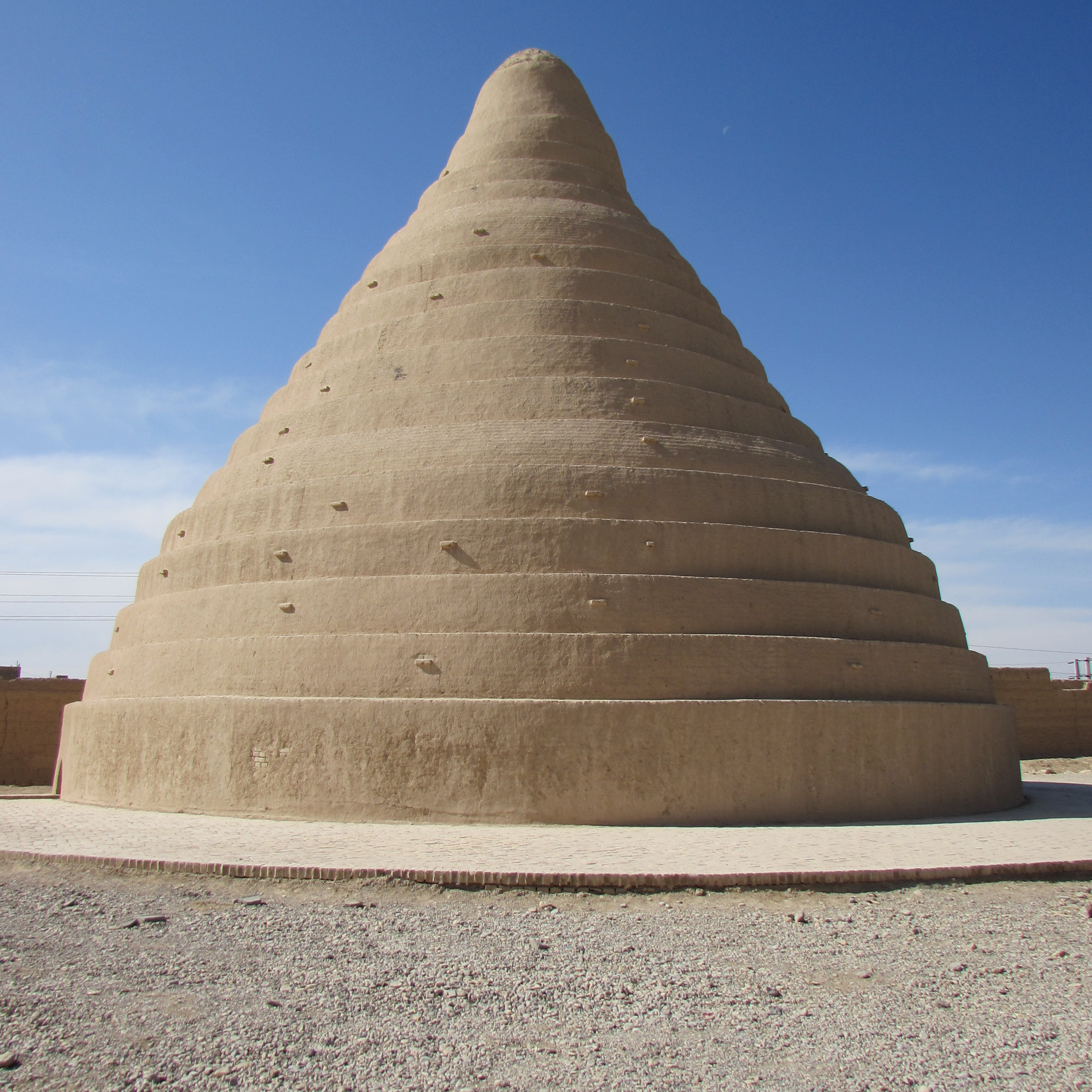
Abarkuh Cliff refrigerator

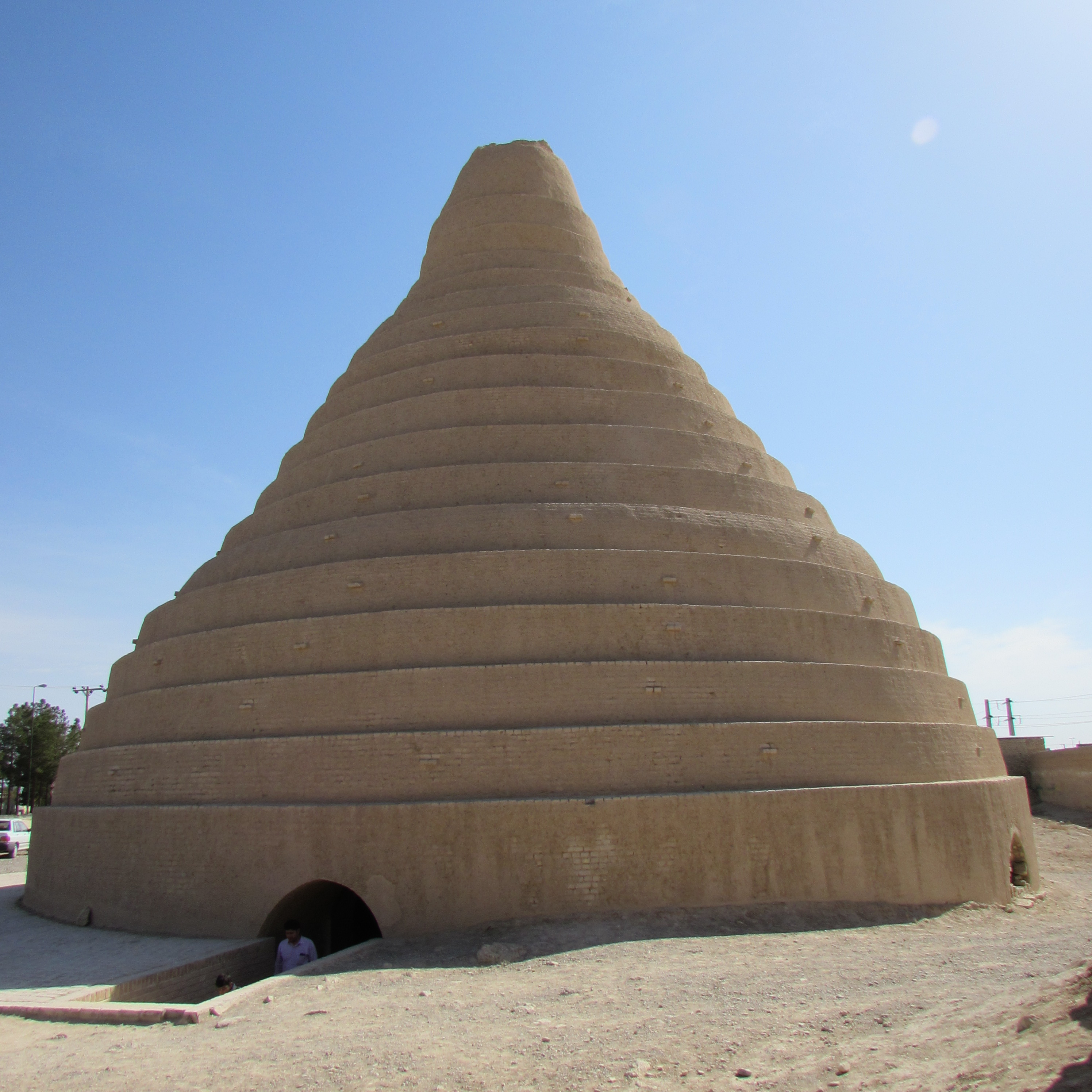
Abarkuh Cliff refrigerator

== See also ==
Media related to Abarkuh at Wikimedia Commons
