= Tizak, Afghanistan =

Settlement in Kandahar Province, Afghanistan

Tizak تيزاك
- other
- Location in Afghanistan
- Coordinates: 34°18′0″N 68°14′0″E
- Country: Afghanistan
- Province: Kandahar
- District: Shah Wali Kot
- Elevation: 1,416 m (4,646 ft)
- Time zone: UTC+4:30

Tizak (Pashto: تیزک) is a location in Shah Wali Kot District, Afghanistan located at 34° 18' 0" north, 68° 14' 0" east. The village is 1416m above sea level. Tizak is 45 km north of Kandahar, on the Kandahar Highway, between Bum, Afghanistan and Jaldak. The area is arid with temperature fluctuating between 40 °C and -35 °C. In 2010 the town was the site of the Shah Wali Kot Offensive
