= Khorramabad, Rafsanjan =

Khorramabad خرم اباد
- Village
- Location within Iran
- Coordinates: 30°27′43″N 55°57′35″E
- Country: Iran
- Province: Kerman
- County: Rafsanjan
- Bakhsh: Central
- Rural District: Razmavaran

Population (2006)
  - Total: 37
- Time zone: UTC+3:30 (IRST)
  - Summer (DST): UTC+4:30 (IRDT)

Khorramabad (Persian: خرم اباد, also Romanized as Khorramābād and Khurramābād) is a village in Razmavaran Rural District, in the Central District of Rafsanjan County, Kerman Province, Iran. At the 2006 census, its population was 37, in 7 families.
