= Khorramabad, North Khorasan =

Khorramabad خرم اباد
- Village
- Location within Iran
- Coordinates: 37°20′16″N 58°06′30″E
- Country: Iran
- Province: North Khorasan
- County: Shirvan
- Bakhsh: Central
- Rural District: Howmeh

Population (2006)
  - Total: 62
- Time zone: UTC+3:30 (IRST)
  - Summer (DST): UTC+4:30 (IRDT)

Khorramabad (Persian: خرم اباد, also Romanized as Khorramābād) is a village in Howmeh Rural District, in the Central District of Shirvan County, North Khorasan Province, Iran. At the 2006 census, its population was 62, in 18 families.
