= Khorramabad-e Olya, Kermanshah =

Khorramabad-e Olya خرم ابادعليا
- Village
- Location within Iran
- Coordinates: 34°39′43″N 46°39′32″E
- Country: Iran
- Province: Kermanshah
- County: Ravansar
- Bakhsh: Central
- Rural District: Hasanabad

Population (2006)
  - Total: 263
- Time zone: UTC+3:30 (IRST)
  - Summer (DST): UTC+4:30 (IRDT)

Khorramabad-e Olya (Persian: خرم ابادعليا, also Romanized as Khorramābād-e ‘Olyā; also known as Khorramābād-e Bālā and Khurramābād) is a village in Hasanabad Rural District, in the Central District of Ravansar County, Kermanshah Province, Iran. At the 2006 census, its population was 263, in 58 families.
