= Khorramabad-e Sofla, Kermanshah =

Khorramabad-e Sofla خرم ابادسفلي
- Village
- Location within Iran
- Coordinates: 34°38′44″N 46°39′29″E
- Country: Iran
- Province: Kermanshah
- County: Ravansar
- Bakhsh: Central
- Rural District: Hasanabad

Population (2006)
  - Total: 444
- Time zone: UTC+3:30 (IRST)
  - Summer (DST): UTC+4:30 (IRDT)

Khorramabad-e Sofla (Persian: خرم ابادسفلي, also Romanized as Khorramābād-e Soflá; also known as Khorram Ābād, Khorramābād-e Pā’īn, and Khūrramābād) is a village in Hasanabad Rural District, in the Central District of Ravansar County, Kermanshah Province, Iran. At the 2006 census, its population was 444, in 103 families.
