= Esfandar Rural District =

Rural district in Yazd province, Iran

Esfandar Rural District Persian: دهستان اسفندار
- Rural District
- Location within Iran
- Coordinates: 30°49′45″N 53°37′22″E
- Country: Iran
- Province: Yazd
- County: Abarkuh
- District: Bahman
- Capital: Esfandabad

Population (2016)
  - Total: 4,044
- Time zone: UTC+3:30 (IRST)

Esfandar Rural District (Persian: دهستان اسفندار) is in Bahman District of Abarkuh County, Yazd province, Iran. Its capital is the village of Esfandabad.

== Demographics ==
=== Population ===
At the time of the 2006 National Census, the rural district's population was 3,824 in 1,086 households. There were 3,992 inhabitants in 1,211 households at the following census of 2011. The 2016 census measured the population of the rural district as 4,044 in 1,301 households. The most populous of its 133 villages was Esfandabad, with 1,449 people.
