= Mehrabad Rural District (Abarkuh County) =

Rural district in Yazd province, Iran

Mehrabad Rural District Persian: دهستان مهرآباد
- Rural District
- Location within Iran
- Coordinates: 31°03′44″N 53°29′40″E
- Country: Iran
- Province: Yazd
- County: Abarkuh
- District: Bahman
- Capital: Mehrdasht

Population (2016)
  - Total: 2,055
- Time zone: UTC+3:30 (IRST)

Mehrabad Rural District (Persian: دهستان مهرآباد) is in Bahman District of Abarkuh County, Yazd province, Iran. It is administered from the city of Mehrdasht (Note: Formerly the village of Mehrabad)

== Demographics ==
=== Population ===
At the time of the 2006 National Census, the rural district's population was 1,976 in 580 households. There were 2,047 inhabitants in 634 households at the following census of 2011. The 2016 census measured the population of the rural district as 2,055 in 632 households. The most populous of its 98 villages was Bedaf, with 1,111 people.
