= Bahman District =

District in Yazd province, Iran

Bahman District Persian: بخش بهمن
- District
- Location within Iran
- Coordinates: 30°57′27″N 53°33′38″E
- Country: Iran
- Province: Yazd
- County: Abarkuh
- Capital: Mehrdasht

Population (2016)
  - Total: 14,196
- Time zone: UTC+3:30 (IRST)

Bahman District (Persian: بخش بهمن) is in Abarkuh County, Yazd province, Iran. Its capital is the city of Mehrdasht. (Note: Formerly the village of Mehrabad)

== Demographics ==
=== Population ===
At the time of the 2006 National Census, the district's population was 13,001 in 3,422 households. The following census in 2011 counted 13,429 people in 3,839 households. The 2016 census measured the population of the district as 14,196 inhabitants in 4,271 households.

=== Administrative divisions ===
Bahman District Population
Administrative Divisions	2006	2011	2016
Esfandar RD	3,824	3,992	4,044
Mehrabad RD	1,976	2,047	2,055
Mehrdasht (city)	7,201	7,390	8,097
Total	13,001	13,429	14,196
RD = Rural District
