= Tirjerd Rural District =

Rural district in Yazd province, Iran

Tirjerd Rural District Persian: دهستان تيرجرد
- Rural District
- Location within Iran
- Coordinates: 31°16′00″N 53°07′20″E
- Country: Iran
- Province: Yazd
- County: Abarkuh
- District: Central
- Capital: Shahr Asb

Population (2016)
  - Total: 5,927
- Time zone: UTC+3:30 (IRST)

Tirjerd Rural District (Persian: دهستان تيرجرد) is in the Central District of Abarkuh County, Yazd province, Iran. Its capital is the village of Shahr Asb.

== Demographics ==
=== Population ===
At the time of the 2006 National Census, the rural district's population was 5,513 in 1,474 households. There were 5,792 inhabitants in 1,710 households at the following census of 2011. The 2016 census measured the population of the rural district as 5,927 in 1,843 households. The most populous of its 162 villages was Maryamabad, with 1,335 people.
