= Central District (Abarkuh County) =

District in Yazd province, Iran

Central District (Abarkuh County) Persian: بخش مرکزی شهرستان ابرکوه
- District
- Location within Iran
- Coordinates: 31°15′37″N 53°07′22″E
- Country: Iran
- Province: Yazd
- County: Abarkuh
- Capital: Abarkuh

Population (2016)
  - Total: 36,907
- Time zone: UTC+3:30 (IRST)

The Central District of Abarkuh County (Persian: بخش مرکزی شهرستان ابرکوه) is in Yazd province, Iran. Its capital is the city of Abarkuh.

== Demographics ==
=== Population ===
At the time of the 2006 National Census, the district's population was 29,609 in 8,238 households. The following census in 2011 counted 33,217 people in 9,821 households. The 2016 census measured the population of the district as 36,907 inhabitants in 11,456 households.

=== Administrative divisions ===
Central District (Abarkuh County) Population
Administrative Divisions	2006	2011	2016
Faragheh RD	3,102	3,439	3,456
Tirjerd RD	5,513	5,792	5,927
Abarkuh (city)	20,994	23,986	27,524
Total	29,609	33,217	36,907
RD = Rural District
