= Abarkuh County =

County in Yazd province, Iran

Abarkuh County Persian: شهرستان ابرکوه
- County
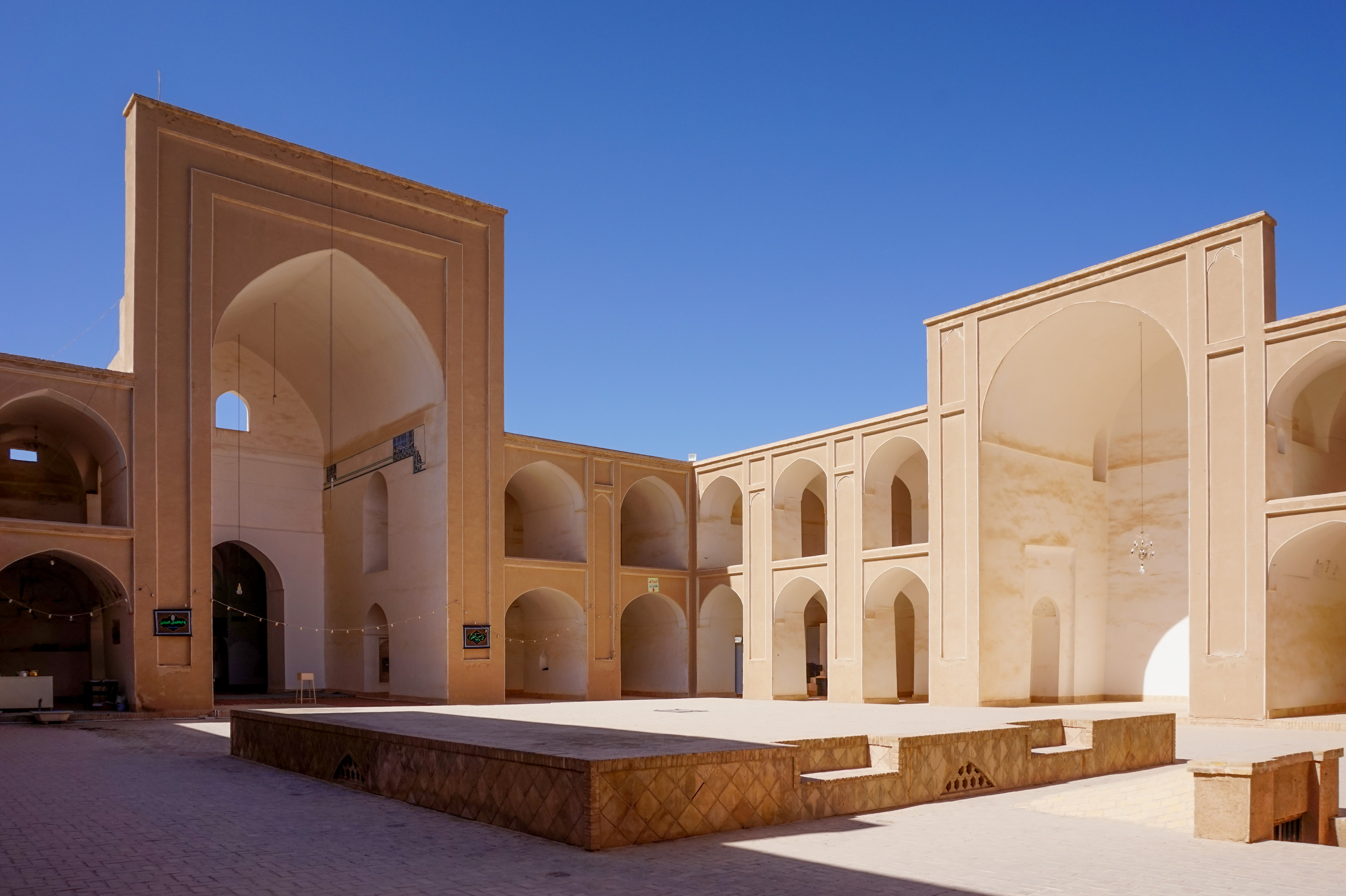
- Jameh Mosque of Abarkuh

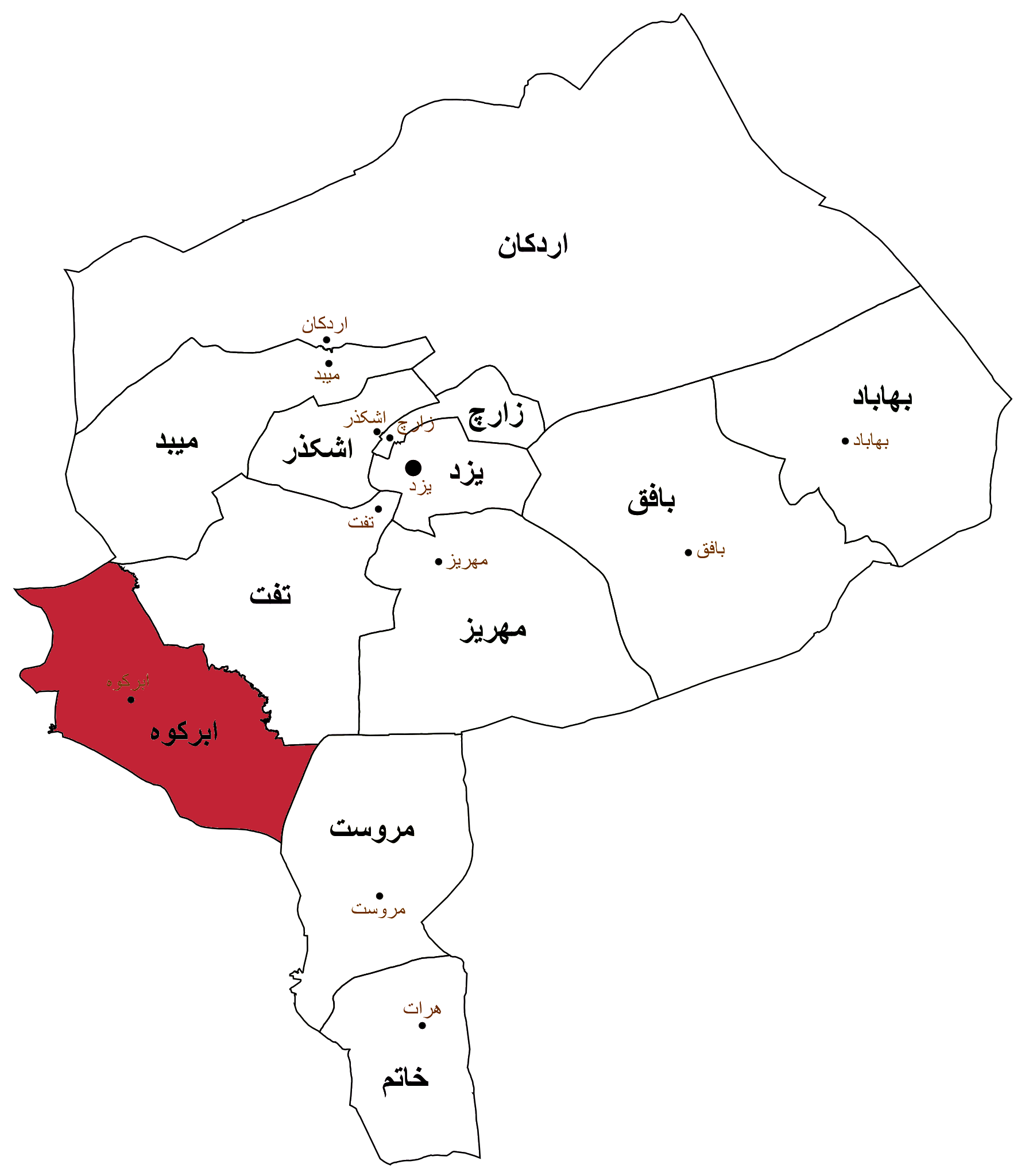
- Location of Abarkuh County in Yazd province

- Location of Yazd province in Iran
- Coordinates: 31°06′N 53°24′E
- Country: Iran
- Province: Yazd
- Capital: Abarkuh
- Districts: Central, Bahman

Population (2016)
  - Total: 51,552
- Time zone: UTC+3:30 (IRST)

Abarkuh County (Persian: شهرستان ابرکوه) is in Yazd province, Iran. Its capital is the city of Abarkuh.

== Demographics ==
=== Population ===
At the time of the 2006 National Census, the county's population was 42,610 in 11,660 households. The following census in 2011 counted 46,662 people in 13,640 households. The 2016 census measured the population of the county as 51,552 in 16,026 households.

=== Administrative divisions ===
Abarkuh County's population history and administrative structure over three consecutive censuses are shown in the following table.

Abarkuh County Population
Administrative Divisions	2006	2011	2016
Central District	29,609	33,217	36,907
Faragheh RD	3,102	3,439	3,456
Tirjerd RD	5,513	5,792	5,927
Abarkuh (city)	20,994	23,986	27,524
Bahman District	13,001	13,429	14,196
Esfandar RD	3,824	3,992	4,044
Mehrabad RD	1,976	2,047	2,055
Mehrdasht (city) (Note: Formerly the village of Mehrabad)	7,201	7,390	8,097
Total	42,610	46,662	51,552
RD = Rural District

== See also ==
- Castle of Khosrow abad

Media related to Abarkuh County at Wikimedia Commons
