= Bund =

Bund, BUND, or the Bund may refer to:

== Arts, entertainment, and media ==
- Der Bund, a German-language newspaper published in Bern, Switzerland
- Shanghai Bund (TV series), a 2007 Chinese television remake of the 1980 Hong Kong television series The Bund produced by TVB
- The Bund (TV series), a 1980 Hong Kong television series produced by TVB
- The Bund II, a 1980 Hong Kong television series produced by TVB
- The Bund III, a 1980–1981 Hong Kong television series produced by TVB
- The Bund, a fictional refuge for vampires in the manga series Dance in the Vampire Bund

== Organizations ==
- Bund: Gemeinschaft für ein sozialistisches Leben, a communitarian group of Germans resisting the Nazis, 1924–1968
- Bund für Umwelt und Naturschutz Deutschland, or Friends of the Earth Germany, one of Germany's largest environmental protection organisations
- Communist League (Japan), a radical Marxist student group, nicknamed "The Bund"
- General Jewish Labour Bund, a political party founded in the Russian Empire (primarily Lithuania, Poland, and Russia)
- General Jewish Labour Bund in Poland, a political party founded in Poland
- General Jewish Labour Bund (disambiguation), for other organizations with that name
- German American Bund, a pro-Nazi pre–World War II organization
- International Jewish Labor Bund, New York–based international Jewish socialist organization
- The Deutscher Bund (German Confederation), an association of 39 German-speaking states in Central Europe, created by the Congress of Vienna in 1815 to coordinate the economies of separate German-speaking countries

== People with the name ==
- Károly Bund (1869–1931), Hungarian forestry engineer and early environmentalist
- Lisa Bund (born 1988), German pop singer

== Places ==
- Old Bund, a waterfront area in Ningbo, China
- The Bund, a waterfront area in Shanghai, China

== Other uses ==
- Bundesanleihe, German government-issued bonds, commonly referred to as "the Bund" or "Bunds"
- Bunding, a structure designed to prevent inundation or breaches in construction
- Bundism, a Jewish socialist and secular movement founded in the Russian Empire in 1897
- Semicircular bund agricultural technique to help control water and restore vegetation to parched lands

== See also ==
- Bandh (disambiguation)
