= Bandan =

Bandan (Persian: بندان) may refer to:

- Bandan, Sistan and Baluchestan
- Bandan, Boshruyeh, South Khorasan
- Bandan, Nehbandan, South Khorasan
- Bandan Rural District, in South Khorasan Province

== See also ==
- Ban Dan (disambiguation), several places in Thailand
- Bandhan (disambiguation)
