= Tabaseyn =

Tabaseyn or Tabasin or Tabbasein (Persian: طبسين) may refer to:

- Tabaseyn-e Bala
- Tabaseyn-e Pain
