= Bandha =

Bandha (बन्ध, a Sanskrit term for "binding, bond, arrest, capturing, putting together" etc.) may refer to:

- Bandha (yoga)
- Bandha (Jainism)

== See also ==
- Bandh (disambiguation)
- Bandham (disambiguation)
- Bandhan (disambiguation)
- Ashtanga (vinyasa) yoga § Bandhas
- Bandhu
- Trul khor
- Karma in Jainism
