= Badgaon =

Badgaon or Bargaon may refer to the following places in India:

- Bargaon, Kamrup, a village in Kamrup rural district, Assam
- Bargaon, Odisha, a village in Odisha
- Badgaon, Jalore, a village in Jalore district, Rajasthan
- Bargaon, Udaipur, a town in Girwa tehsil, Udaipur district, Rajasthan
- Badgaon Bandh, a village in Mavli tehsil, Udaipur district, Rajasthan
- Bargaon (archaeological site), a Harappan site in Saharanpur district, Uttar Pradesh
- Bargaon, Saharanpur, a village in Saharanpur district, Uttar Pradesh
- Bargaon Village, Saharsa, a village in Saharsa district, Bihar
