= Leo von Jena =

German SS commander (1876–1957)

- Born: 8 July 1876; Biebrich, Wiesbaden, Hessen-Nassau, Kingdom of Prussia, German Empire
- Died: 7 April 1957 (aged 80); Celle, Lower Saxony, West Germany
- Military career
- Allegiance: German Empire; Weimar Republic; Nazi Germany
- Branch: Imperial German Army; Reichswehr; Waffen-SS
- Rank: SS-Obergruppenführer
- Conflicts: World War I World War II

Leo von Jena, also called Leo Ferdinand von Jena (July 8, 1876 - April 7, 1957), was a German military officer who became an Schutzstaffel (SS) general during World War II and commander of the Waffen-SS in Berlin. Jena joined the German National People's Party and the Sturmabteilung (SA) in 1921. He joined the Nazi Party in 1937. On November 9, 1936, he joined the Schutzstaffel and Heinrich Himmler personally accepted him as an honorary Sturmbannführer, where he rose through the SS ranks. On March 30, 1941, he was promoted to Brigadeführer of the Waffen-SS. On January 30, 1944, he was promoted to Obergruppenführer of the Allgemeine SS and Lieutenant General (Generalleutnant) in the Waffen-SS.

== World War I ==
Jena was the eleventh child of the Prussian officer and later general of the infantry Eduard von Jena (1834–1911) and his first wife Elisabeth Auguste Karoline Helene, née Freiin von Dalwigk (1840–1880).

In May 1896 he joined the cadet corps (Kadettenkorps) with the Life Grenadier Regiment König Friedrich Wilhelm III. (1st Brandenburg) with the rank of Fahnenjunker. On November 18, 1897, he was promoted to second lieutenant and assigned to the war school in Danzig. In May 1902, he transferred to the Holstein Field Artillery Regiment No. 24 in Güstrow. Between April 30, 1903, and 1911 he served in various military units. On February 18, 1908, Jena was promoted to Oberleutnant. In 1911, he became adjutant of the Landwehr district of Frankfurt (Oder). In September 1912, he became an aid and adviser to Prince Friedrich Leopold of Prussia. On October 18, 1912, he was promoted to Hauptmann (captain). In August 1913, Jena was appointed personal adjutant to Prince Friedrich.

At the beginning of World War I in August 1914, Jena joined the 2nd Cavalry Division in Belgium and France. On 21 October 1914, he married his then-fiancée Josefine Margarethe Schumacher. In December 1914, he became a company commander and battalion commander in the 5th Guards Regiment in Masuria, East Prussia. In the spring of 1915, Jena was deployed back to France and suffered a knee injury during the Second Battle of the Marne. After recovery, he was deployed to the reserve battalion of the 5th Guards Regiment in Spandau, where he was appointed deputy adjutant of the 4th Guards Infantry Brigade in the fall of 1915. Soon he transferred to the Landwehr division of the Guards Corps. In November 1916, Jena was promoted to commander of the 1st Battalion of the 4th Foot Guards Regiment and assigned to the staff for the 1st Foot Guards Regiment in October 1917. Towards the end of the war, Jena was commander of Reserve Infantry Regiment No. 932.

== Weimar Republic ==
Jena viewed himself as a victim of the November criminals, those that lost in the war due to an antisemitic conspiracy theory. On December 16, 1918, he founded the National Association of German Officers with other officers loyal to the monarchy, like Alfred Krauss. On January 12, 1919, Jena joined one of the approximately 200 Freikorps in Germany. In Berlin he became leader of the Volunteer Detachment Jena in the Freikorps von Oven. In 1919, Jena was accepted as a captain in the provisional Reichswehr army and was promoted to major in October 1919 of Reichswehr Infantry Regiment 6. On December 31, 1920, Jena was released from the Reichswehr at his own request. On January 1, 1921, he was employed by the Reichswehr leadership as leader of the clean up command of the Reichswehr Infantry Regiment 6. In 1921, he joined Alfred Hugenberg's German National People's Party and became a leader in its military arm, the Stahlhelmbund, where he met Prussian Lieutenant General Paul Hausser. In the Stahlhelmbund he became the liaison officer of the Bund to the German ex-Kaiser Wilhelm II and was on friendly terms with him. He stayed several times with Wilhelm II in exile at Doorn in the Netherlands.

== National Socialism ==
In 1934, Jena joined Wilhelm Reinhard's Kyffhäuserbund for war veterans in Berlin. The veterans group became aligned with Adolf Hitler's Sturmabteilung (SA). Thus Jena joined the Reichsbetriebszellenabteilung (Spandau Comradeship of Life Grenadiers No. 8) of the Nazi Party.

On February 1, 1934, Jena was elected to the federal leadership of the National Socialist Reichskriegerbund (NSRKB), a Nazi veteran group and took over the personnel department of the Federal Leader's staff. On the same day he joined the SA Reserve II, and was put in charge of member support for the staff of Supreme State Leader Adolf Hitler. In 1936, Paul Hausser who had joined the SS-Schutzstaffel persuaded Jena to switch his membership from the SA to the SS (SS no. 277,326). On November 9, 1936, Jena was accepted into the SS at the rank of Sturmbannführer by Reichsführer-SS Heinrich Himmler. As Sturmbannführer he became leader of the staff of the SS Main Office.

While Jena joined the SS at his friend's urging, he still had strong ties and feelings to the House of Hohenzollern monarchy and Wilhelm II. SS leaders criticized him for his old views and not strongly adhering to Nazism. Two days after being accepted into the SS, the staff chancellery information center of the SS security service reported to the Reichsführer after examining "the political background" of Jena:

Major a. D. Jena was still strongly nationalist after the takeover. (...) Jena is considered an outspoken monarchist and was the liaison between the Stahlhelm leadership and the ex-Kaiser. In this capacity, he was in Doorn for a long time. Because of this fact, von Jena cannot be called politically reliable. (...)

On November 15, 1937, von Jena applied for admission to the Nazi Party and was admitted retroactive to May 1, 1937 (membership number 4,359,167).

== World War II ==
In September 1939, Jena was transferred to the SS Totenkopf Unit, where became a leader in the 5th Totenkopfstandarte for the Brandenburg Euthanasia Centre, he departed the centre before the killing began in February 1940. On December 1, 1939, Jena was transferred to the emerging Waffen-SS, when he set up the 8th SS Totenkopfstandarte in Kraków. He also became leader of police reinforcements, in occupied Poland. The police reinforcements were a special police task force for "gang and anti-partisan use".

On May 1, 1940, Jena was appointed "SS-Oberführer for the Reserve" of the Waffen-SS. On July 11, 1940, he was transferred to the Command Office of the Waffen-SS. As Group Leader II (Organization), he headed a department in the Management and Organization Office Group of Office I, part of the SS Führungshauptamt.

On March 30, 1941, he was appointed Brigadeführer of the Allgemeine SS and received the right from Himmler to wear the "uniform and rank insignia of a major general of the Waffen SS". With Himmler's permission, Jena was now outwardly wearing the same rank in the Waffen-SS as in the Allgemeine SS and which he had not yet received in the Waffen-SS. But within the SS leadership office, which was responsible for the command of the Waffen-SS, his position was controversial. A letter from SS Personnel Manager Maximilian von Herff to Karl Wolff (November 23, 1942) read:

Around Hans Jüttner there is a circle that needs to be monitored because it can become dangerous. This is the liaison of Gruppenfuhrer Petri, Brigadefuhrer Jena and Hansen. They are far removed from SS-like thinking and willing. They only want to be officers of the Guard, the other things are just a side issue for them! (...)

On April 1, 1941, Jena was appointed location commander (Standortkommandanten) of the Waffen-SS in Berlin, but on February 10, 1942, he wrote to Himmler asking to be dismissed, citing health problems:

My state of health has deteriorated so much in recent times that I am afraid that I will no longer be able to fill the post of SS site commander for Berlin in any case, as the Führer may have to demand. (...) I therefore ask you, Reichsfuhrer, to arrange for me to be relieved of my current position. (...) Should I be able to serve the Fuehrer in any other position within the Waffen-SS, I will of course remain available to you at any time for any other use you may have. (...).

On March 1, 1943, Jena was replaced as Berlin site commander of the Waffen-SS, but remained a member of the SS and was promoted to brigade leader of the reserve on July 1, 1944. Himmler had granted him the right to wear the Waffen-SS uniform and the rank insignia of a major general.

On November 17, 1943, Jena asked in writing for "dismissal from active service in the Waffen-SS with the statutory pension as of April 30, 1944". A letter to Heinrich Himmler ended with the words:

(...) With inner satisfaction I will always remember the time when I was allowed to serve the Führer and Greater Germany in the Waffen-SS in this most violent war of all times. (...) Of course, I, Reichsfuhrer, remain at your disposal whenever and wherever I may be needed. My life belongs to the Führer and the fatherland!

Jena joined HIAG for a short time then joined the Bund Deutscher Officere, a traditional association of former members of the Reichswehr and Wehrmacht, which he departed in 1956 and was not active in veterans groups again. He died on April 7, 1957, from an illness.

== Awards ==
- Knight's Cross of the Griffin Order (12)
- Princely Reuss Cross of Honor III. class with crown (12)
- Iron Cross (1914) 2nd and 1st class
- Knight's Cross of the Royal House Order of Hohenzollern with Swords
- Friedrich-August-Kreuz 2nd and 1st class
- Mecklenburg Military Merit Cross 1st Class
- SS Civil Badge (No. 192,576)
- Yule candlesticks of the RFSS (December 1936)
- Ring of Honor RFSS
- Honorary Sword of the Reichsfuhrer SS
- Hungarian World War II Commemorative Medal
- Honor's Corner of the Ancient Fighters
- War Merit Cross (1939) 2nd and 1st class with swords

== See also ==
- Register of SS leaders in general's rank
