= Bandhan =

Bandhan may refer to:

== Film ==
- Bandhan (1940 film), an Indian Bollywood film directed by N.R. Acharya
- Bandhan (1956 film), a Hindi drama film starring Meena Kumari
- Bandhan (1969 film), a Hindi drama film starring Rajesh Khanna and Mumtaz
- Bandhan (1991 film), a Marathi film
- Bandhan (1998 film), a Bollywood drama/action film starring Salman Khan, Rambha and Jackie Shroff
- Bandhan, a 2003 Assamese film
- Bandhan (2004 film), a Bengali film starring Jee, Koyel Mullick, Victor Banerjee directed by Rabi Kinagi

== Television ==
- Bandhan (2000 TV series), a Hindi Drama series produced by Balaji Telefilms
- Bandhan (Indian TV series), a Hindi Zee TV production
- Bandhan (Pakistani TV series), an Urdu language PTV production

== Other uses ==
- Bandhan Bank, an Indian banking and financial services company
- Bandhan, Vikramgad, a village in the Palghar district of Maharashtra, India

== See also ==
- Bandan (disambiguation)
- Bandham (disambiguation)
- Bandh (disambiguation)
- Bandha (disambiguation)
- Bandhana, a 1984 Indian film
- Bandhanam, a 1978 film
- Bandhani, a dyeing process in India
- Raksha Bandhan, an Indian religious festival
