= General Jewish Labour Bund (disambiguation) =

General Jewish Labour Bund usually refers to the original incarnation of the Labour Bund of Lithuania, Poland and Russia.

General Jewish Labour Bund may also refer to:

- General Jewish Labour Bund in Latvia
- General Jewish Labour Bund in Poland
- General Jewish Labour Party
