= Zhu Baosan =

Chinese businessman and philanthropist (1848–1926)

- 朱葆三
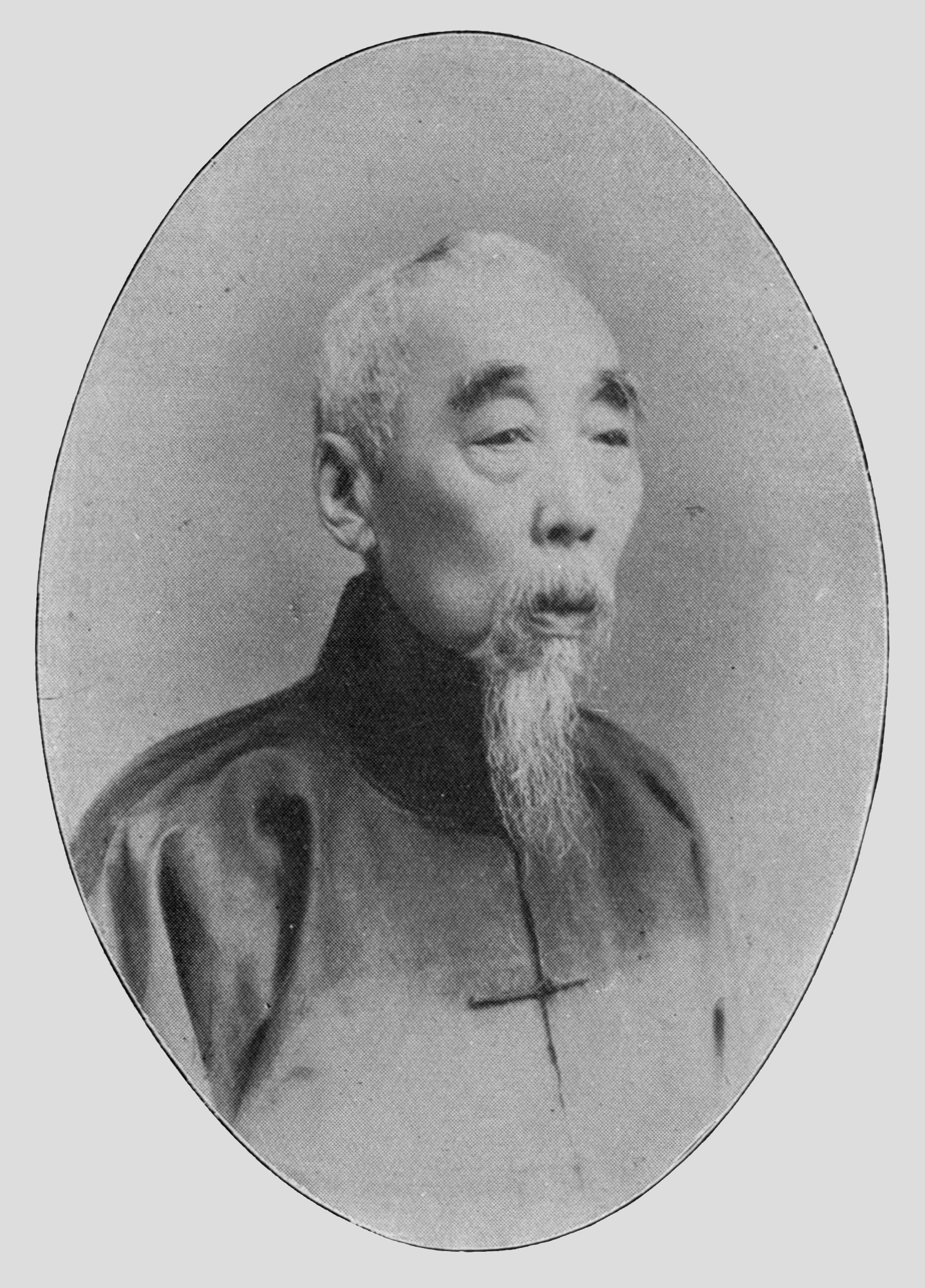
- Born: Zhu Peizhen; 11 March 1848; Dinghai County, Zhejiang, China
- Died: 2 September 1926 (aged 78); Shanghai, China
- Occupations: Businessman, philanthropist

Chinese name
- Chinese: 朱葆三
Transcriptions
Standard Mandarin
- Hanyu Pinyin: Zhū Bǎosān
- Wade–Giles: Chu^{1} Pao^{3}San^{1}

Zhu Baosan (Chinese: 朱葆三; pinyin: Zhū Bǎosān, 11 March 1848 – 2 September 1926) was a Chinese businessman and philanthropist. Born in Dinghai County, Zhejiang, he moved to Shanghai at the age of fourteen to apprentice at a hardware store. He was promoted rapidly, and in 1878 he established the Shenyu Hardware Store. He subsequently diversified into such industries as banking, insurance, milling, mining, and ironworking, later serving three terms as the president of the Shanghai Chamber of Commerce. In his philanthropy, Zhu promoted education, healthcare, and disaster relief, serving for a time as the director of the Red Cross Society of China.

== Biography ==
=== Early life ===
Zhu was born Zhu Peizhen (朱佩珍) in Dinghai County, Zhejiang (now part of Zhoushan), on 11 March 1848. (Note: Powell (1925, p. 225) and The North China Herald, 1926-11-06 give 1847.) He was the son of Zhu Xianglin, an official, and spent some time studying to join the Qing dynasty. However, after his father fell ill, the family's wealth was depleted. Zhu thus decided to enter commerce.

=== Business activities ===
Aged 14, he travelled to Shanghai and took an apprenticeship at the Xieji Hardware Store, eventually becoming sales director, deputy manager, and manager. As an adult, he took the courtesy name Baosan and taught himself English and other mercantile skills. Zhu established his own business, the Shenyu Hardware Store, in 1878. Over time, he diversified. In 1890 Zhu became a comprador for the British-owned Liddell Brothers & Co. Zhu thereby became involved in various industries, including banking, insurance, oil extraction, coal mining, ironworks, shipping, and flour milling. Between 1895 and 1910, he founded the Hu'an Fire and Marine Insurance Company, and made investments in the Hongyuan Cotton Mill and the Lida Flour Mill.

With the initiation of the Shanghai Chamber of Commerce in 1902, Zhu became one of five general directors; he was later elected to three consecutive terms as president, serving for 24 years. In this capacity, he invested heavily in banking, helping grow such institutions as the Bank of China (later serving as its director) and the Siming Bank. During the 1911 revolution, Zhu replaced Shen Manyun as the finance official of the Shanghai Military Governor's Office. In this capacity he helped guide the city's economic recovery. In 1919, during the May Fourth Movement, he sent a telegram on behalf of the Chamber of Commerce supporting Premier Duan Qirui; this was condemned by contemporary Shanghai society.

=== Philanthropy ===
As his business grew, Zhu became involved in various philanthropic activities. With fellow businessmen Ye Chengzhong and Wang Yiting, he established the Guangyi Charity Hall in 1888. He donated money for the establishment of the Changchun Medical Bureau in Dinghai in 1898, and spearheaded fundraising for the reconstruction of the Zuyin Temple in 1910. Several of his projects focused on education, both in Dinghai and in Shanghai. During the 1911 Revolution, Zhu acted as an accountant with the Red Cross Society of China, in which capacity he helped bring food and medicine to affected areas. He also facilitated easy access to rice, both by pressuring government officials and through a charitable organization.

Zhu took over the Ningbo Tongxianghui, a native place association for people from Ningbo, after the death of its founder Shen Honglai. Already a prominent member of the Siming Gongsuo, another Ningbo-oriented association, in 1911 Zhu renamed the group the Ningbo Lü Hu Tongxianghui and erected new edifices on Fuzhou Road. As the tongxianghui grew, new headquarters were constructed on Tibet Road in 1916. There emerged a division of labours, with the Ningbo Tongxianghui dealing with social and economic affairs and the Siming Gongsuo handling rituals, ceremonies, and charitable affairs. Zhu also co-sponsored a hospital to treat infectious diseases during Shanghai's 1919 cholera epidemic.

Through the 1920s Zhu advanced a number of causes. As discussions were ongoing to ban prostitution in Shanghai in 1920, Zhu wrote the Municipal Council to advocate for active campaigns against the activity. He raised funds to help disaster victims, both in China and abroad; this included in Java in 1919 and in Japan following the 1923 Great Kantō earthquake. He also established the China Women and Children Relief Association to provide housing and education to women and children.

=== Death ===
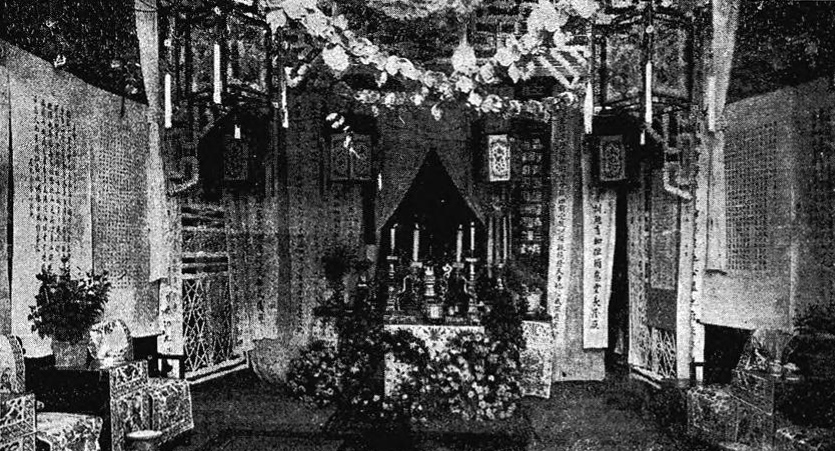
The funeral of Zhu Baosan

By 1925, Zhu was the chairman of the Chinese General Chamber of Commerce in Shanghai, as well as the vice-chairman of the National Association of Chambers of Commerce. He died on 2 September 1926 at his home in Shanghai. At the time, he was the director of the Xinwen Bao newspaper, a trustee for several schools, the director of multiple medical organizations (including the Red Cross Society of China), and a patron of philanthropic organizations that ranged from an orphanage through an anti-kidnapping association. The North-China Herald wrote that, because of the extent of his philanthropic activities, Zhu's friends believed that his assets were greatly depleted and he left only a "small fortune".

Funeral ceremonies were held at the Zhu family home on Arsenal Road beginning on 1 November 1926. These were heavily subsidized by the various organizations in which Zhu had been a member. The house was decorated in white and blue, with scrolls bearing the condolences of such figures as former president Li Yuanhong, General Lu Yongxiang, Marshal Sun Chuanfang, and Premier Wellington Koo; thousands of Shanghai residents attended. A procession, described by The North-China Herald as likely the largest in Shanghai history, was planned for 7 November; it was to include hundreds of armed guards, with Zhu's casket in a hearse pulled by eight horses.

== Family ==
Zhu was predeceased by his wife, as well as one son. He was survived by five sons and six daughters, twenty-five grandchildren, and five great-grandchildren.

In 1920, Zhu's son Zhija was investigated in relation to the murder of Wang Lianying, as he had lent an automobile to the killer. With his son in the news, Zhu was accused by The New World in a 23 June editorial for an ongoing rice shortage. He also told the Shanghai Mixed Court that he had been receiving libelous letters, which he blamed on Lianying's family, as a result of the investigation, and was rumoured to have spent 3,000 yuan (equivalent to ¥293,081 in 2019) to silence the press.

== Legacy ==
The Rue Chu Pao-san in the Shanghai French Concession was named for Zhu between 1922 and 1926. It is now called Xikou Road. The Zhoushan Museum has held several mobile exhibitions focusing on Zhu and his contributions to the city.

== Works cited ==
- Chen Mingda (陈明达) (30 December 2022). 朱熹后裔朱葆三初探 [A Preliminary Study of Zhu Baosan, a Descendant of Zhu Xi]. Zhejiang Online (in Chinese).
- "Death of Mr. Chu Pao-san". The North-China Herald. Shanghai. 4 September 1926. p. 451.
- Goodman, Bryna (1995). Native Place, City, and Nation: Regional Networks and Identities in Shanghai, 1853–1937. Berkeley: University of California Press. ISBN 978-0-520-08917-4.
- He, Qiliang (2018). Newspapers and the Journalistic Public in Republican China: 1917 as a Significant Year for Journalism. New York, London: Routledge. ISBN 978-0-429-79669-2.
- Hershatter, Gail (1999). Dangerous Pleasures: Prostitution and Modernity in Twentieth-Century Shanghai. Berkeley: University of California Press. ISBN 978-0-520-20439-3.
- 实业慈善家朱葆三 [Industrial Philanthropist Zhu Baosan]. China Philanthropy Times (in Chinese). 3 September 2024.
- Li Mengxiao (李梦晓), Mao Ruohan (毛若寒) (23 December 2022). 舟山博物馆 [Zhoushan Museum]. Encyclopaedia of China (in Chinese) (3rd ed.).
- Peng, Shanmin (29 June 2022). "Social Network: How Shanghai Stemmed the Surge, 100 Years Ago". Sixth Tone. Archived from the original on 1 July 2022.
- Powell, J. B., ed. (1925). Who's Who in China. Shanghai: Millard's Review.
- "The Mourning Ceremonies for Mr. Chu Pao-san". The North-China Herald. Shanghai. 6 November 1926. p. 257.
- "The Murder of Lien Ying". The North-China Herald. Shanghai. 28 August 1920. pp. 573–575 – via Newspaper Archive.
- Wang Changfan (王昌范) (15 February 2024). 上海总商会里寻"阿宝" [Looking for "Abao" in the Shanghai General Chamber of Commerce]. The Paper (in Chinese).
- Xiong Shanghou (熊尚厚) (9 February 2023). 朱葆三 [Zhu Baosan]. Encyclopaedia of China (in Chinese) (3rd ed.).
- Xiong, Yuezhi (2022). Shanghai Urban Life and Its Heterogeneous Cultural Entanglements. Translated by Harris, Lane J.; Mei, Chun. Leiden: Brill. doi:10.1163/9789004522893_008. ISBN 978-90-04-52289-3.
