= Bandh (disambiguation) =

Bandh means "a bond" in Sanskrit and "closed" in Persian. It is a form of political protest in South Asian countries. Bandh may also refer to

Films

- Bandh Darwaza, a 1990 Indian Hindi-language horror movie
- Bharat Bandh, a 1991 Indian Telugu-language political thriller film
- Hafta Bandh, a 1991 Indian film
- Darwaaza Bandh Rakho, a 2006 Indian Hindi-language comedy film
- Bandh Nylon Che, a 2016 Indian Marathi-language family drama film

Other

- Badgaon Bandh, a village in Rajasthan, India
- Ummed Sagar Bandh, a dam near Jodhpur in Rajasthan, India

== See also ==
- Bandham (disambiguation)
- Bandhan (disambiguation)
- Bund (disambiguation)
