= Ningbo Merchants Group =

Merchant group in China

The Ningbo Merchants Group (simplified Chinese: 宁波商帮; traditional Chinese: 寧波商幫; pinyin: Níngbō Shāng Bāng), or just simply Ningbo Group, also known as the Grassroots Businessmen, was one of the ten largest commercial groups during the Ming and Qing dynasties, and it became the single biggest commercial regional group of China in the Late Qing dynasty.

== History ==
Throughout the 19th and 20th centuries, the Ningbo Group had business in banking and insurance; shipbuilding, both junks and steamships; clothing, both locally produced and imported from western countries; medicine; and fishing. During the Beiyang government period, their trade influence spread to Shanghai, Wuhan, and Tianjin.

In the mid-20th century, Ningbo merchants expanded to Hong Kong and overseas to Taiwan, amongst other places.

In 2004, the Ningbo Gang Conference was held and called for the creation of a "New Ningbo Gang" to aid to development of Ningbo. The legacy of the Ningbo Group is taken up by the International Ningbo Merchants Association

== Notable people ==
Notable members of the Ningbo Group include:

- Yue Xianyang and his family (founder of Tong Ren Tang)
- Bao Yugang
- Dong Haoyun
- Run Run Shaw
- Zhu Baosan
- Liu Hongsheng

== See also ==
- Economy of China
- Economic history of China (Pre-1911)
- Economic history of China (1912–1949)
