= Bandham =

Bandham may refer to:

- Bandham (1983 film), a 1983 Indian Malayalam film
- Bandham (1985 film), a 1985 Indian Tamil film
- Bandham (2018 TV series), an Indian Telugu language soap opera

== See also ==
- Bandh (disambiguation)
- Bandha (disambiguation)
- Bandhan (disambiguation)
