= Old Bund =

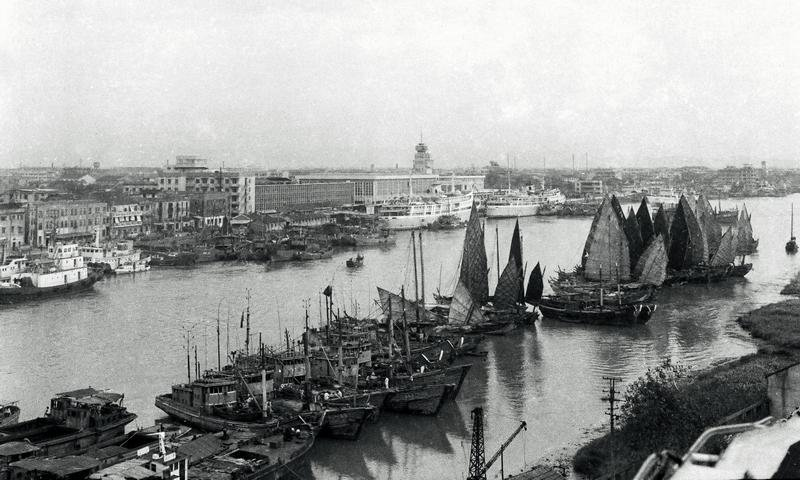
The Old Bund in the 1920s

The Old Bund (simplified Chinese: 老外滩; traditional Chinese: 老外灘; pinyin: Lǎo Wàitān; Ningboese: lau^{2} nga^{3}thae^{1}), originally known as the North Riverbank (Chinese: 江北岸; pinyin: Jiāngběi'àn; Ningboese: kaon^{1}poh^{4}nge^{3}), is a waterfront area in Jiangbei District, Ningbo.

The Old Bund is on the north bank of the Yong River. It was the site of the Port of Ningbo since 1840s till late 1990s. The North Riverbank was the result of Treaty of Nanking, and witnessed the initiation and development of Ningbo Commercial Group.

== History ==
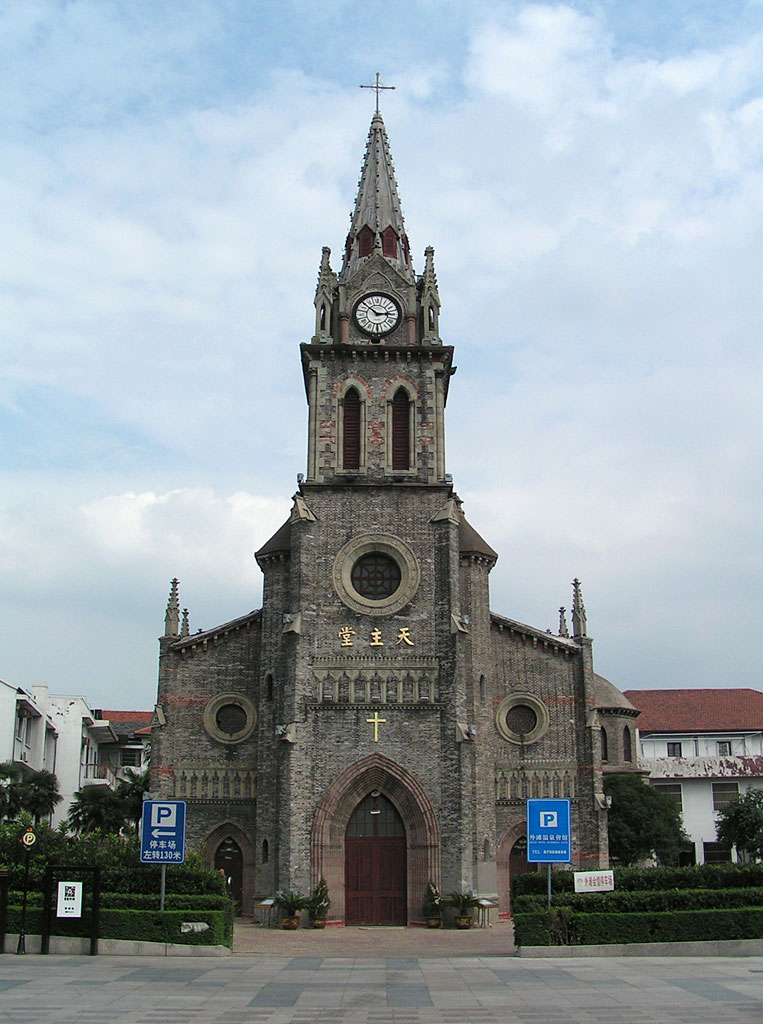
Cathedral of Our Lady of the Seven Sorrows

The Old Bund sat piers of the Port of Ningbo, and all the trade between Ningbo and Japan, Korea and Southeast Asia was made through it. The trading tracked back to 1842 when the Sino-Britain Treaty of Nanking was signed, and Ningbo was thereafter a trading port. Ever since then the westerners came to Ningbo. However, ships could not make it into the ancient port, and therefore the North Riverbank came into being.

In 1844, Ningbo was officially opened as a trading port, the North Riverbank was hence the residential spot for foreign merchants. The North Riverbank became the first Bund in China, 20 years before The Bund of Shanghai. Western modern facilities and buildings were built along the North Riverbank ever since, which marks the beginning of the modernization of Ningbo.

However, the Port of Shanghai caught up later, and the importance of the Port of Ningbo decreased. In 1927, the Chinese government regained the administration of the Old Bund, and it became an important transportation terminus for both passengers and cargo.

== Historic sites ==
There are 54 historic sites on the Old Bund. The following are some of the major historic sites:

- Major Historical and Cultural Site Protected at the National Level: Cathedral of Our Lady of the Seven Sorrows.
- Major Historical and Cultural Site Protected at Zhejiang Provincial Level: the old site of Zhejiang Customs, the old site of the British Consulate, the old site of Xie's, and the old site of Ningbo Post.
- Major Historical and Cultural Site Protected at Ningbo Municipal Level: Jiangbei Police Station, The Hongchangyuan, The Zhu's, and The Yan's Hills.

== Modern sites ==
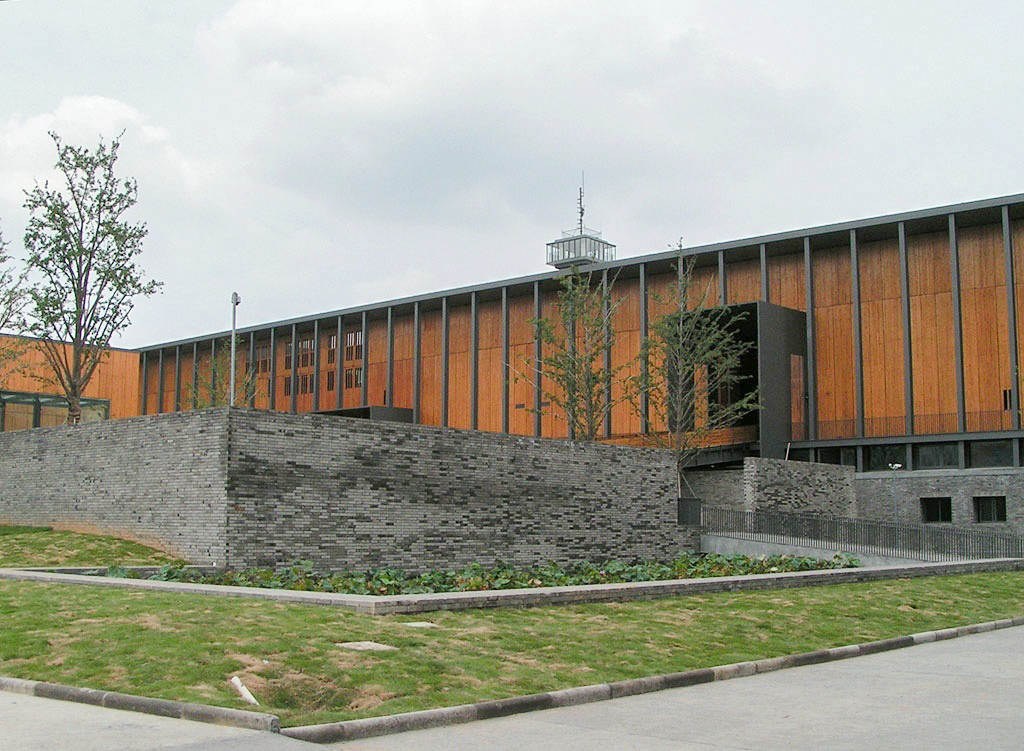
Ningbo Museum of Art

- Ningbo Museum of Art
- Ningbo Urban Planning Exhibition Center
- Bridge of the Bund
