= Wang Yiting =

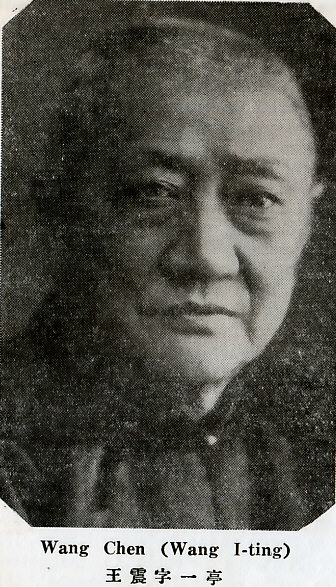
Wang Yiting

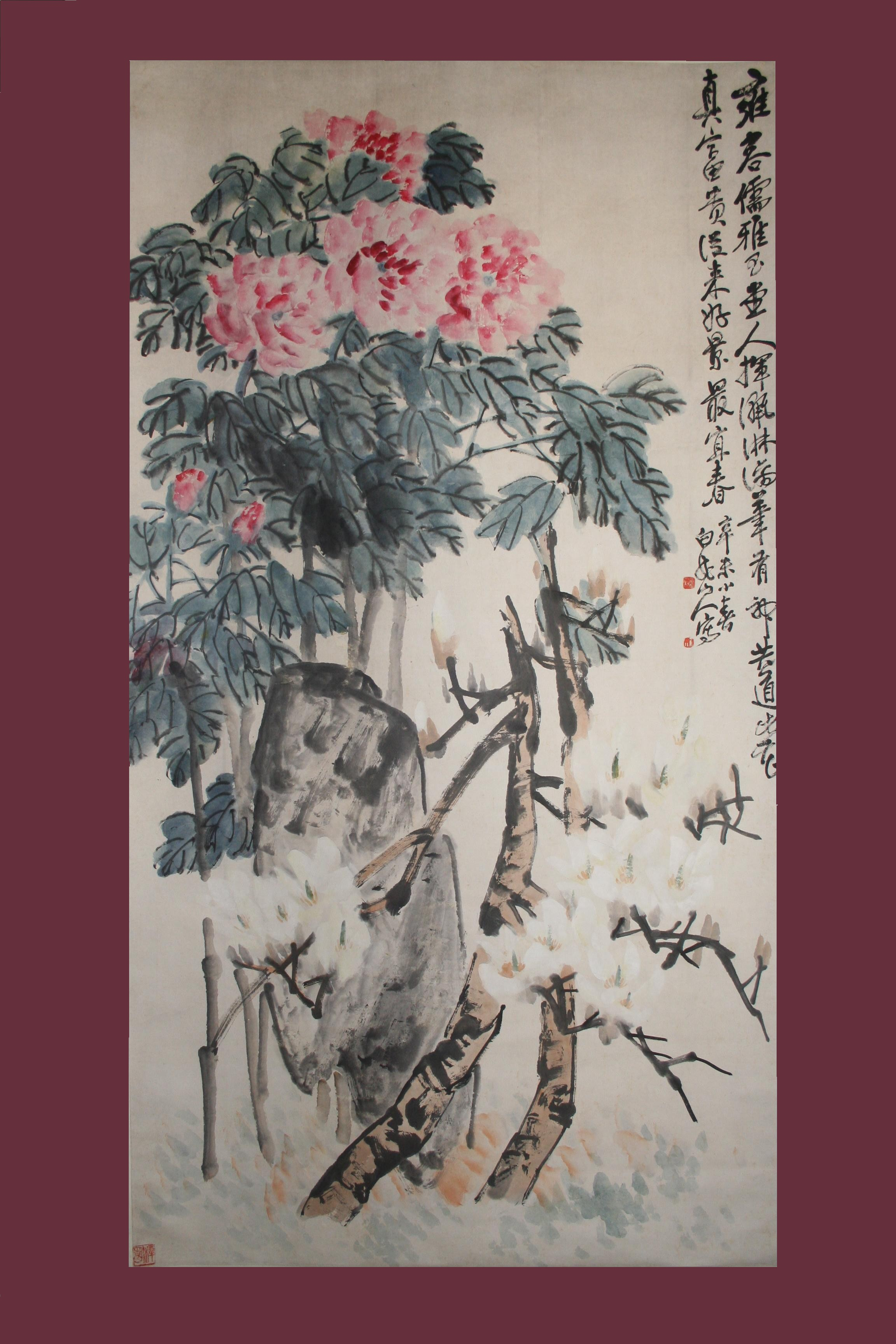
Flowers 1931, Nantoyōsō Collection, Japan

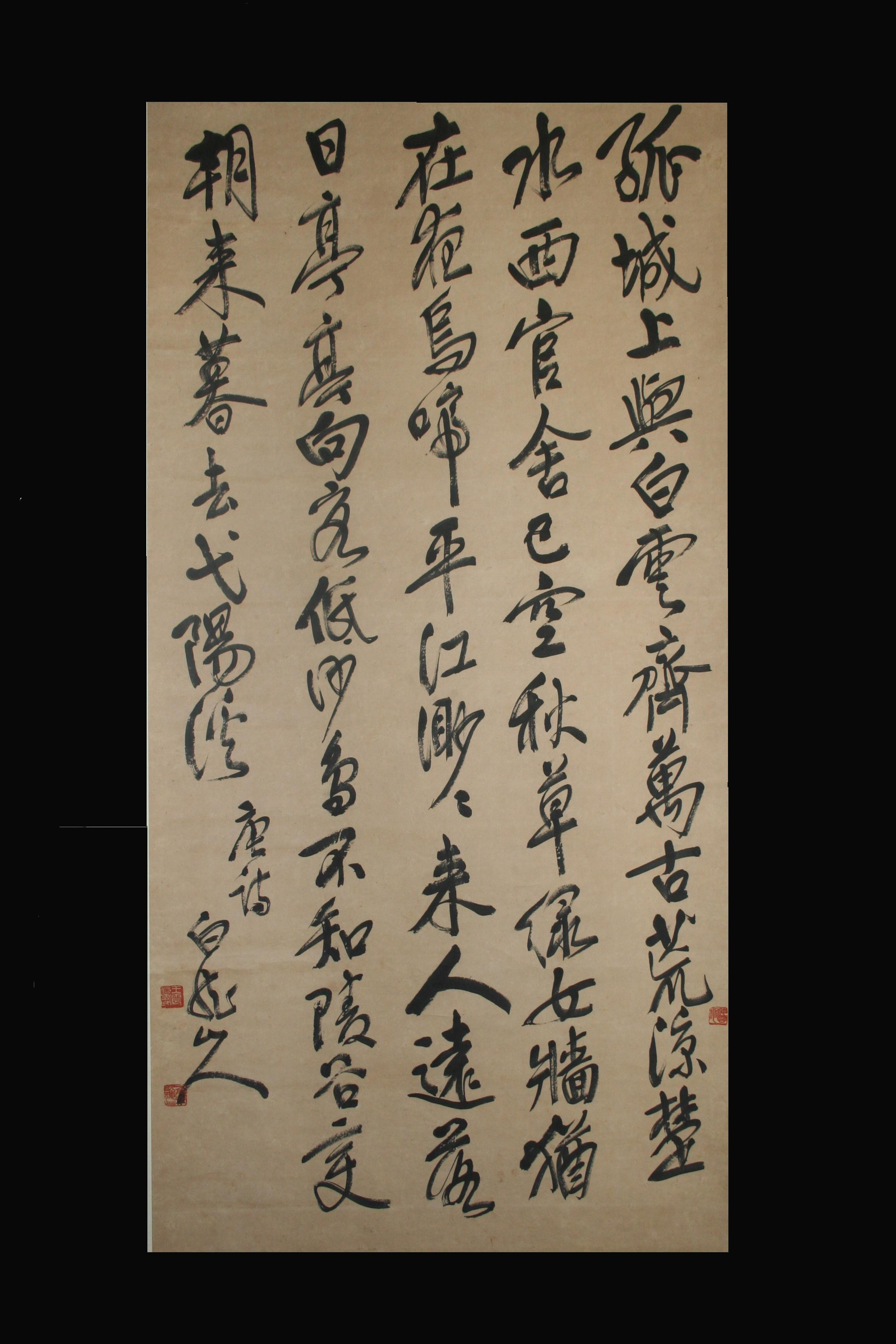
Tang Poem Calligraphy, Nantoyōsō Collection, Japan

Wang Zhen (Chinese: 王震; Wade–Giles: Wang Chen; 4 December 1867–13 November 1938), commonly known by his courtesy name Wang Yiting (Chinese: 王一亭; Wade–Giles: Wang I-t'ing), was a socialite, prominent entrepreneur, philanthropist, and celebrated modern Chinese artist of the Shanghai School. He also used the art name Bailong shanren and as a devote Buddhist under other names. His family was from Wuxing in Zhejiang Province, although he was born in the city of Shanghai where he was a successful banker. Wang Zhen was a master calligrapher as well as a painter of flowers, birds, personages and Buddhist subjects. He was closely associated with and a disciple of the painter Wu Changshuo. It is sometimes said that many of his teacher's paintings were from Wang Zhen himself.

Wang Zhen's paintings enjoy a considerable popularity in Japan where he had made many trips in his business and artistic career. The Japanese reading of his courtesy name is Oh Ittei (おう いってい). This Japanese connection was one he shared with his mentor Wu Changshuo.

== Biography ==
=== Early Life and Education ===
Born on December 4th, 1867 in Shanghai, China, Wang Zhen was the eldest of three sons and two daughters of Wang Futang and Ms. Chiang. Wang Futang was betrothed with Ms. Chiang while working under her father's textile shop.

Wang Zhen was educated by his maternal grandmother, who taught him reading, writing, and Chinese painting. His maternal uncle taught at Zhu's private school, where Wang Zhen later attended for eight years. At the age of 13, he left to start his apprenticeship at the Shen Yu Money House.

During his free time, he learned foreign languages at Shanghai Guang Fangyan Guan (school of foreign languages) where he learned Japanese, and studied Confucius classics, poetry, and philology under Peng Xiaoteng and Cheng Langfeng. Within three years, Wang Zhen completed his apprenticeship at the money house, and was referred to Heng Tai Money House for a full-time position. While working at the money house, he studied Chinese painting under Xu Xiaolun, then studied under his master Ren Bonian.

=== Entrepreneurships ===
Historians describe Wang Zhen as an entrepreneur, who spent much of his adulthood on investments and establishing businesses ranging from flour mills, to banks.

At 20 years old, Wang Zhen worked as a commercial agent for the Tian Yu Sand Ship. With this experience, Hori Keijiro appointed Wang Zhen to become a comprador of the Osaka Shosen Kaisha in 1902, at 35 years old. With his savings, he began several entrepreneurships throughout his life.

In 1904, Wang Zhen invested in the Shanghai Dada River Steamship company, and became a board director and manager. Under his management, the company's net worth increased by eight folds in 1921.

The Shanghai Chinese Merchants' Public Assembly was formed in 1906 by a group of Shanghainese gentry and merchants, serving as a local self-government where Wang Zhen also actively participated. Later that year, Shen Manyun, and Wang Zhen, among other people, raised funds to form the Shanghai Xincheng Commercial Savings Bank. Shen Manyun and Wang Zhen later formed the Yecheng Company (real estate company) under the savings bank. He was also appointed as a director of the South Shanghai Chamber of Commerce, and elected as a member of the board of the Preparatory Constitutional Association.

Between 1907 and 1910, Wang Zhen, Shen Manyun, and many other Chinese investors, gathered funds to open two flour mills, the Lida flour mill in 1907, and the Shanda flour mill in 1910.

In 1909, after the establishment of the Yu Garden of Calligraphy and Painting Association, Wang Zhen became the president and, along with other fellow artists, would band together to protect traditional Chinese painting from the Republic of China.

The same year, Wang Zhen became the chief secretary general of the newly established Shanghai Products Exhibition Office. After the reorganization of the South Shanghai Chamber of Commerce, the association was renamed to the Southern Shanghai Chamber of Commerce Association, and Wang Zhen was elected as the first president. Later, he raised funds to privatize the Commercial-Savings Bank of China, where Wang Zhen served as the chairman. In 1916, he was appointed to the Council of General Chamber of Commerce.

=== Political Career ===
After the formation of the Tongmenghui, Wang Zhen joined the alliance as the financial section chief in 1910. The year after, the Wuchang Uprising broke out, and numerous other uprisings across China occurred afterwards.

In 1911, Chen Qimei organized a meeting among leaders of the Tongmenhui to plan an uprising in Shanghai. The group decided to gain support from the merchant militias and local gentry to gain support and manpower for the uprising, and planned to attack the Jiangnan Arsenal. The first attempt led by Chen Qimei ended in failure, and the second attempt happened the day after, led by Wang Zhen the team attacked at dawn and successfully captured the Jiangnan Arsenal. He became the newly established Shanghai Military Government's Minister of Communication, later known as the Minister of Agriculture, Industry, and Commerce. The year after, he submitted his resignation as the minister.

Wang Zhen represented the Shanghai General Chamber of Commerce at the Shanghai General Chamber of Commerce in 1912, where he addressed issues regarding the industrial and commercial development in Shanghai. He was later elected as the vice-president of the Shanghai General Chamber of Commerce, and became the Shanghai branch head of the Kuomintang.

March 22th, 1913, Song Jiaoren died of a gunshot wound. The Shanghai branch of Kuomintang with Wang Zhen, Chen Qimei, and Shen Manyun held a public memorial for Song Jiaoren. Wang Zhen oversaw his burial and construction of Song Jiaoren's tomb. Almost a month after the funeral, Wang Zhen resigned from both his position at the Kuomintang, and his position at the Shanghai General Chamber of Commerce.

Later investigations revealed that Yuan Shikai plotted the assassination of Song Jiaoren, which Wang Zhen opposed. Historians believe that Yuan Shikai, backed by the power of the Shanghai Municipal Council (SMC) of the International Settlement, expelled Wang Zhen, along with Sun Wen, Chen Qimei, Shen Yun, Yang Xinzhi, Cen Chunxuan, Li Pingshu, and Huang Xing, for opposing Yuan Shikai. While in exile, Wang Zhen became a disciple of Wu Changshuo, with whom he often collaborated with for future artistic endeavours.

During the third Shanghai armed uprising in 1927, Wang Zhen, along with other merchants, helped Jiang Jieshi rally support from local commercial and industrial associations and groups, forming the Shanghai Commercial Federation.

=== Arts and Sino-Japanese Exchange ===
In historical records of the early years of the Republic of China, there were attempts to destroy traditional Chinese painting, to encourage the use of western style of painting such as oil painting, while negatively impacting the careers of Chinese painters including Wang Zhen, and shutting down art schools. In response, Wang Zhen and many other artists established societies, art schools, and associations to preserve traditional Chinese painting. He also took advantage of the popularity of Chinese painting in Japan during the 1910s to 1930s, and through the medium of arts he created friendships between himself and Japanese artists.

One of the early Japanese guests of Wang Zhen was the Japanese journalist Tokutomi Soho, who arrived in Shanghai in 1917, and stayed at Shiraishi Rokusaburō's Liusan Garden for a banquet in his honor, organized by Fujimura. The same year, Shanghai Tijin Hall's Epigraphy, Calligraphy, and Painting Association organized a fundraiser in which Wang Zhen participated. Wang Zhen later financed the establishment of a Shanghai school of traditional medicine.

After Liu Haisu founded The Shanghai Painting and Fine Arts Institute, later called the Shanghai Academy of Fine Arts, Wang Zhen joined the board of trustees. The academy later established the Tianma Society in 1919, when Wang Zhen served as part of the judging committee of their first exhibition. The Sino-Japanese Art Association invited Wang Zhen as one of their advisors, and he later established the Sino-Foreign Relief Association.

Japanese poet Otani Zekū visited Shanghai in 1920, and was welcomed with a banquet hosted by Wang Zhen. The month after, Otani Zekū reciprocated with a banquet at Liusan Garden.

In 1922, Wang Zhen became a member of the Shanghai Calligraphy and Painting Association. In Shanghai, he organized an exhibition at the Japanese Club which featured paintings from China, Japan, and the west. Later that year, he participated in the second Sino-Japanese painting exhibition, held in Japan where he exhibited six of his paintings. Another exhibition at the Japanese Club in Shanghai was held, featuring Wang Zhen exhibiting Chinese paintings, and Japanese artists Takuda Fu and Yamada Shunpo.

Albert Einstein and his wife were on their way to Japan to give lectures on the theory of relativity, and laid over in Shanghai on November 13th 1922, where Wang Zhen hosted a banquet and Chinese painting viewing. The Dean of Zhejiang School of Law and Politics Ying Shi and his wife Zhang Shuhe and their daughter Ying Huide served as German-Chinese translators throughout the dinner party.

The same year, Osaka Takashimaya Art Department opened an exhibit on Wang Zhen's and Wu Changshuo's artworks, and published a book featuring a collection of Wang Zhen's artworks. The Sino-Japanese Art Club was established in 1923 by Wang Zhen, Wu Changshuo, and Omura Seigai. The Shanghai Academy of Fine Arts also created a Chinese painting department, where Wang Zhen was assigned to be an instructor. The Shanghai Calligraphy and Painting Association published an issue of the Shenzhou Jiguang Ji, where Wang Zhen was featured.

In 1924, Jiangsu Provincial Fine Arts Exhibition hosted their first art exhibit in Shanghai for 10 days, where Wang Zhen participated as one of the judges of the Chinese Painting category. For the third Sino-Japanese painting exhibition, Wang Zhen exhibited some of his works. Two weeks later, the Japanese Club hosted a large exhibit of artworks by Wang Zhen, which was organized by Japanese artist Ishino Chosen.

Wang Zhen mediated a worker's strike at a Japanese cotton-mill in Shanghai, at the request of the then president of the General Federation of Shanghai Trade Associations Yuan Lüden, in 1925. Despite the initial agreement reached after three days of strikes, another worker's strike occurred four months later.

After the death of Sun Yat-sen in 1925, a funeral monument was planned for his mausoleum. An international architecture competition was held, where Wang Zhen was appointed as a consulting judge of Sun Yat-sen's mausoleum design contest. He and three other judges awarded Lü Yanzhi's design first prize.

The Suyue Painting Society was established in 1926, with Wang Zhen as honorary president, and the Jieyi Society was jointly founded by Wang Zhen with fellow Chinese and Japanese artists, with the purpose of studying and appreciating ancient paintings. The fourth Sino-Japanese painting exhibition was held with Wang Zhen presenting 14 works in total across two cities.

In 1927, Wang Zhen was invited by the Shanghai Academy of Fine Arts for weekly painting demonstrations.

The first National Fine Arts exhibit in Shanghai was organized by Wang Zhen in 1929 at Xin Puyu Hall. At the Mainichi Shimbun building, he also exhibited some of his artworks alongside Chinese artists such as Huang Binhong, and Zhang Daqian. Wang Zhen also exhibited artworks at the fifth Sino-Japanese painting exhibition, and gave a speech.

He also founded and became the principal of the Shanghai Changming Art College in 1930, which offered education in Chinese painting, but shut down due to lack of accreditation. Wang Zhen later joined the Sino-Japanese Art Fellowship along with other artists such as Di Chuqing and Pan Tianshou.

In 1931, Wang Zhen welcomed Masaki Naohiko back to Shanghai for a banquet hosted by the Sino-Japanese Art Fellowship, with invitees including Japanese artist Watanabe Shinpo, envoy Shigemitsu Mamoru, and Consul General Murai Kuramatsu. Wang Zhen and his fellow Chinese artists then went to Tokyo to participate in their Sino-Japanese painting exhibition, where they were welcomed by the Japanese audience, and visited by the Japanese Empress Dowager.

The Chinese Painting Association was later established and Wang Zhen was appointed an executive. At the behest of the Kuomintang, in 1932 Wang Zhen joined the committee to help organize the Chinese art exhibit in Berlin. The same year, he joined the committee board for the construction of the new campus and museum of the Shanghai Academy of Fine Arts. The year after, a French curator of the Musee du Jeu de Paune followed the advice of Xu Beihong to select artworks from 50 Chinese modern artists, including Wang Zhen.

In Berlin of 1934, an art exhibit on modern Chinese art was held, and the Berlin Art Museum requested artworks to be displayed long term, one of which was a painting by Wang Zhen. Over the summer of the same year, the Shanghai Academy of Fine Arts hosted training courses for art instructors taught by various artists including Wang Zhen.

=== Philanthropy and Buddhism ===
Wang Zhen spent a large portion of his life dedicated to the people of Shanghai, from organizing fundraisers to establishing charity organizations and associations. The philanthropy may have been a product of the uprisings throughout Shanghai, and the natural disasters that impacted both parts of China and Japan. His education in Buddhism also healed people spiritually, and helped spread the belief.

Under the French Concession from 1849 until 1943, Shanghai's local authorities refrained from interfering with public concerns, one of which was the issue of corpses. The burial of unidentified bodies were instead done by charity organizations, one of which was founded by Wang Zhen called the Shanghai Public Benevolent Cemetery.

Towards the end of 1906, he and Li Pingshu founded the Shanghai Orphanage, and after receiving funding from the Commercial Press a decade later, the orphanage was able to expand to become the biggest of its time.

In 1909, Zhu Baosan and Wang Zhen established the China General Relief Association for Women and Children.

In 1917, Shanghai Tijin Hall's Epigraphy, Calligraphy, and Painting Association organized a fundraiser in which Wang Zhen participated. Ding Ganren, Zhu Baosan, and Wang Zhen, among other people, later financed the establishment of a Shanghai school of traditional medicine. Shanghai Tijin Hall's Epigraphy, Calligraphy, and Painting Association organized a fundraiser in which Wang Zhen participated. Ding Ganren, Zhu Baosan, and Wang Zhen, among other people, later financed the establishment of a Shanghai school of traditional medicine.

To aid the flood victims in 1918, the Shanghai Tijin Hall's Epigraphy, Calligraphy, and Painting Association organized another fundraiser, in which Wang Zhen participated again. The Chinese Federation of Charitable Organizations was formed to combat the ongoing natural disasters, with Wang Zhen serving as a deputy director alongside Zhu Baosan.

Within the year 1920, more floods and droughts hit the regions around the Yangtze river, while northern China was hit with famine and an earthquake. The Shanghai Tijin Hall's Epigraphy, Calligraphy, and Painting Association ran a fundraiser to aid the people in northern China by selling charity certificates, gifted with works by many artists including Wang Zhen, Wu Changshuo, and Cheng Yaosheng. Charities affiliated with the Chinese Federation of Charitable Organizations were tasked with opening fundraising offices around the Yangtze river, with Wang Zhen and Xu Ganlin serving as deputy chief secretary-generals, and Zhuo Baosan as chief secretary-general.

The year after the natural disasters along the Yangtze river, a plague hospital under the Chinese Red Cross was founded by Tang Luyuan and Wang Zhen, where he was director. Under Wang Zhen's leadership as Director of Relief Operations, the Jiangsu–Zhejiang–Anhui Flood Relief Association was formed to relieve the impacts of the floods.

In 1922, the Yu Garden ran a fundraiser featuring Chinese artists, such as Wang Zhen, who painted artworks to raise funds for winter necessities for the impoverished. Another society, China Calligraphy and Painting Preservation Society, was formed by Wang Zhen with a group of artist co-founders.

In September of 1923, The Great Kantō Earthquake struck Japan. In response, the Chinese Beiyang government sent donations for disaster relief, and the China Association for Relief of Japanese Disaster Victims was established, where Wang Zhen was one of the vice chairs. The association loaded the Xinming vessel with necessities ranging from rice to charcoal and medicine, to be sent to Kobe, Japan.

Wang Zhen also organized Buddhist rites and memorial services for the earthquake victims, with rites performed for 49 days at four sacred mountains, and a week-long memorial service at the Jade Buddha Temple in Shanghai. At Xianzhao Temple, there was a 49 day long memorial and a 100 days long ritual of chanting. Both temples' services were to relieve those who died from the earthquake. He sent a telegram to the Japanese Minister of Foreign Affairs, Baron Ijūin, intending to donate a Buddhist bell to Japan, which the minister accepted in 1925, and placed the bell in the area that was hit the hardest by the earthquake.

In honor of Wang Zhen's contributions to the earthquake relief, the Yôjitsu Industries APP Trading Corporation sponsored the publication of a catalog of his artworks, with an inscription in the catalog by Utsunomiya Tokuma that reads, "Mr. Wang Yiting, [we] will never forget our spiritual debt".

He was voted as an interim executive committee member at the newly established Shanghai Federation of Charitable Organizations in 1927. After the Shanghai Municipal Social Affairs Bureau registered the federation, Wang Zhen was appointed as a chairman.

During the 1927 election, he was voted as the head of the World Buddhist Lay Association. In 1929, he was also elected as executive committee member of the newly established Chinese Buddhist Association and helped establish the Buddhist Studies Publishing House. After Wang Zhen was re-elected in 1930, he helped create the Guanhai Art and Culture Society. Later the same year, the Kuomintang appointed Wang Zhen as director and committee member of the Relief Affairs Committee.

In October of 1930, the donated Buddhist bell from the Great Kantō earthquake rang in the now Tokyo Metropolitan Memorial Hall in memory of those who died in the earthquake. Back in Shanghai, Wang Zhen painted The Homeless to raise funds and awareness of the suffering of refugees who were displaced due to natural disasters.

Along with a group of artists in 1931, Wang Zhen organized an event at the Ye family garden to raise disaster relief funds for flood victims. He donated towards He Xiangning's funds for national relief, and contributed paintings towards Liu Haisu's and Qian Shoutie's tea gathering in December.

In 1934, Wang Zhen helped establish the Shanghai Institute of Religious and Philosophical Studies, in hopes of encouraging spiritual healing and welcoming other religions. Later that year, Wang Zhen and Yan Fuqing founded the Shanghai Beggars' Relief Association, with the goal to better the city's image by regularly relocating the homeless population from the streets, and upholding humanitarian values.

In 1936, he was appointed as the chairman of the Central Disaster Relief Reserve Fund Custodial Committee.

In August of 1937, the Japanese forces invaded China, and relief operations aided by Wang Zhen and 17 others quickly began. Institution buildings led by him were used to shelter the dead soldiers and civilians resulting from the invasion. He was one of many artists who contributed paintings to an exhibit held by the Chinese Painting Association and the Chinese Women's Calligraphy and Painting Association, to help raise funds for the frontline troops fending the invasion.

=== Personal Life ===
His private life was solemnly disclosed, what is known are through paper trails such as written second hand accounts, newspapers, marriage records, and death certificates.

In 1888, he married Ms. Xi who died of tuberculosis a year after their wedding, and remarried to Ms. Cao who bore three sons and three daughters. She suddenly fell ill and died at the age of 50, after which Wang Zhen remarried to Ms. Chen, with whom he spent the rest of his life.

In 1906, Wang Zhen moved back to his hometown in Shanghai at the foot of Bailong mountain, earning him the nickname "Bailong Shanren"(白龙山人), the literal meaning being "Person of Bailong Mountain" but commonly translates to "The Hermit of Bailong Mountain".

On July 12th, 1924, Wang Zhen's mother, Ms. Jiang, passed away. Funeral rites were performed in his Zi Garden.

Wang Zhen celebrated his 70th birthday in 1937, at his garden abode with fellow artists. The day after, a memorial stone pavilion in Wuxing was built and named after his nickname, Yiting.

When the Japanese asked Wang Zhen to cooperate with them in their puppet regime in 1938, he refused and left for Hongkong. Months after his arrival, his health started to decline. His surviving sons were summoned to their father, and as his health worsened, he was taken to his eldest son's home in Shanghai.

At 4:15 a.m, November 13th, Wang Zhen passed away at the age of 71 years old. Thousands of attendees paid their respects at his funeral, and the Kuomintang honored him with a tribute for his lifetime service to the country.
