= Chah-e Deghal =

Village in South Khorasan province, Iran

Chah-e Deghal Persian: چاه دغال
- Village
- Location within Iran
- Coordinates: 31°28′32″N 60°45′49″E
- Country: Iran
- Province: South Khorasan
- County: Nehbandan
- District: Central
- Rural District: Bandan

Population (2016)
  - Total: 322
- Time zone: UTC+3:30 (IRST)

Chah-e Deghal (Persian: چاه دغال) (Note: Also romanized as Chāh-e Deghāl; also known as Hoseyn Deh Hardeh (حسين ده هرده)) is a village in Bandan Rural District of the Central District in Nehbandan County, South Khorasan province, Iran.

== Demographics ==
=== Population ===
At the time of the 2006 National Census, the village's population was 300 in 67 households. The following census in 2011 counted 299 people in 66 households. The 2016 census measured the population of the village as 322 people in 69 households.
