= Aliabad-e Chah-e Shand =

Village in South Khorasan province, Iran

Aliabad-e Chah-e Shand Persian: علي اباد چاه شند
- Village
- Country: Iran
- Province: South Khorasan
- County: Nehbandan
- District: Central
- Rural District: Bandan

Population (2016)
  - Total: 588
- Time zone: UTC+3:30 (IRST)

Aliabad-e Chah-e Shand (Persian: علي اباد چاه شند) (Note: Also romanized as ‘Alīābād-e Chāh-e Shand) is a village in Bandan Rural District of the Central District in Nehbandan County, South Khorasan province, Iran.

== Demographics ==
=== Population ===
At the time of the 2006 National Census, the village's population was 804 in 151 households. The following census in 2011 counted 717 people in 148 households. The 2016 census measured the population of the village as 588 people in 137 households.
