= Chah-e Buk =

Village in South Khorasan province, Iran

Chah-e Buk Persian: چاه بوك
- Village
- Location within Iran
- Coordinates: 31°43′57″N 60°24′07″E
- Country: Iran
- Province: South Khorasan
- County: Nehbandan
- District: Central
- Rural District: Bandan

Population (2016)
  - Total: 245
- Time zone: UTC+3:30 (IRST)

Chah-e Buk (Persian: چاه بوك) (Note: Also romanized as Chāh-e Būk) is a village in Bandan Rural District of the Central District in Nehbandan County, South Khorasan province, Iran.

== Demographics ==
=== Population ===
At the time of the 2006 National Census, the village's population was 401 in 85 households. The following census in 2011 counted 265 people in 70 households. The 2016 census measured the population of the village as 245 people in 69 households.
