= Do Kuhaneh =

Village in South Khorasan province, Iran

Do Kuhaneh Persian: دوكوهانه
- Village
- Location within Iran
- Coordinates: 31°47′27″N 60°45′18″E
- Country: Iran
- Province: South Khorasan
- County: Nehbandan
- District: Central
- Rural District: Bandan

Population (2016)
  - Total: 101
- Time zone: UTC+3:30 (IRST)

Do Kuhaneh (Persian: دوكوهانه) (Note: Also romanized as Do Kūhāneh; also known as Cheshem Qūchān (چشم قوچان)) is a village in Bandan Rural District of the Central District in Nehbandan County, South Khorasan province, Iran.

== Demographics ==
=== Population ===
At the time of the 2006 National Census, the village's population was 101 in 26 households. The following census in 2011 counted a population below the reporting threshold. The 2016 census measured the population of the village as 101 people in 13 households.
