= Mohammadabad (1), Bandan =

Village in South Khorasan province, Iran

Mohammadabad Persian: محمداباد
- Village
- Country: Iran
- Province: South Khorasan
- County: Nehbandan
- District: Central
- Rural District: Bandan

Population (2016)
  - Total: 155
- Time zone: UTC+3:30 (IRST)

Mohammadabad (Persian: محمداباد) (Note: Also romanized as Moḩammadābād) is a village in Bandan Rural District of the Central District in Nehbandan County, South Khorasan province, Iran.

== Demographics ==
=== Population ===
At the time of the 2006 National Census, the village's population was 133 in 23 households. The following census in 2011 counted 110 people in 23 households. The 2016 census measured the population of the village as 155 people in 43 households.
