= Bargaon, Saharanpur =

Village in Uttar Pradesh, India

Coordinates: 29°42′22″N 77°31′49″E

Bargaon is a village in Saharanpur tehsil, Saharanpur district, Uttar Pradesh, India.

According to the 2011 India Census the population of Bargaon was 1792; of those 960 were male and 832 female.

Nearby is the Bargaon archaeological site, where remains of the Indus Valley Civilization have been found.
