= Shanghai Mixed Court =

International court, 1864 - 1927

The Shanghai Mixed Court was an international court applying Chinese law to Chinese nationals and unrepresented nationals in the Shanghai International Settlement between 1864 and 1927.

== Origins ==
The collapse of Qing rule in Shanghai during the Taiping Rebellion led to significant numbers of Chinese settling in the international areas, though they were ostensibly prohibited from renting property there. In the absence of Qing administration, the people living in the international settlements, while legally under Qing law, were de facto administered by the existing and functioning foreign courts.

Unsatisfied with this state of affairs, in 1864, the "Mixed Court" was established, with a Qing official cooperating with a foreign consul to achieve some verdict. These courts ruled on Chinese law, applying it to Chinese subjects and "unrepresented foreigners" who belonged to non-treaty state nations. Around the same time, the British moved their main court for extraterritorial cases in China, the British Supreme Court for China, from Hong Kong to Shanghai's British concession, partly under pressure from Qing officials who were concerned with Britain sending its subjects all the way to England for punishment. In British extraterritorial courts, while Qing officials were present in mixed cases, they were sidelined.

== Waning of the Court ==
The Mixed Court itself, when trying cases involving only Chinese citizens, similarly sidelined foreign influence. The Mixed Court served, for the Qing government, as a symbol of extraterritorial jurisdiction over the Chinese community present in the international settlements, where Chinese were deemed foreigners. In the last decade of the Qing dynasty, with growing nationalist sentiment, the problems associated with various different jurisdictions became quite evident as revolutionaries used the protection of foreign jurisdiction to violate Qing dynasty sedition and lèse-majesté laws.

The Court was closed on January 1, 1927.
