= Dore Jacobs =

Dore Jacobs (June 27, 1894 Essen - March 5, 1979 benda) was a teacher of rhythmic education and founder of the Bundesschule für Körperbildung und rhythmische Erziehung, the predecessor institution of the Dore-Jacobs-Berufskolleg.

== Life ==
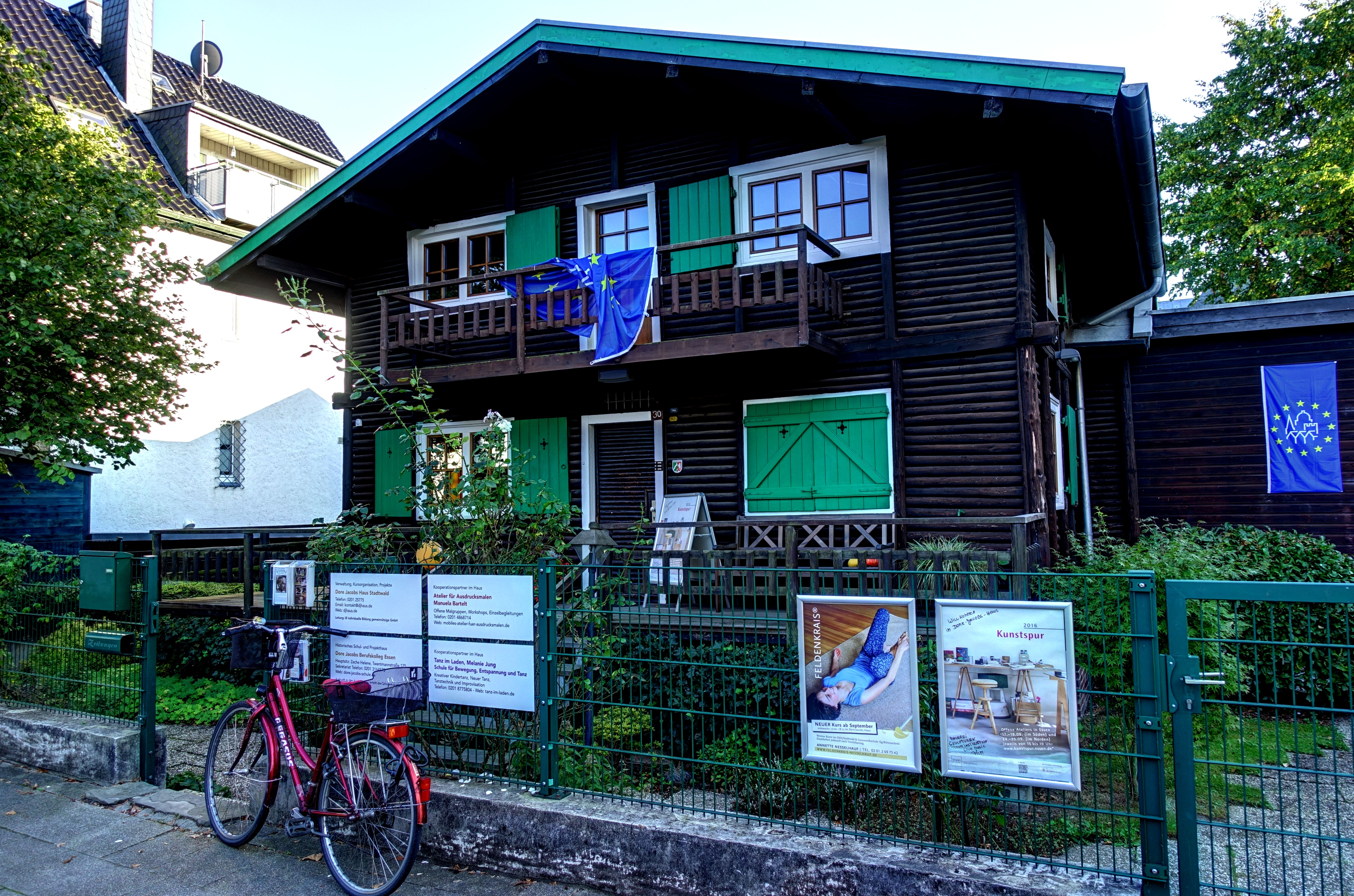
Dore-Jacobs-Haus (2016)

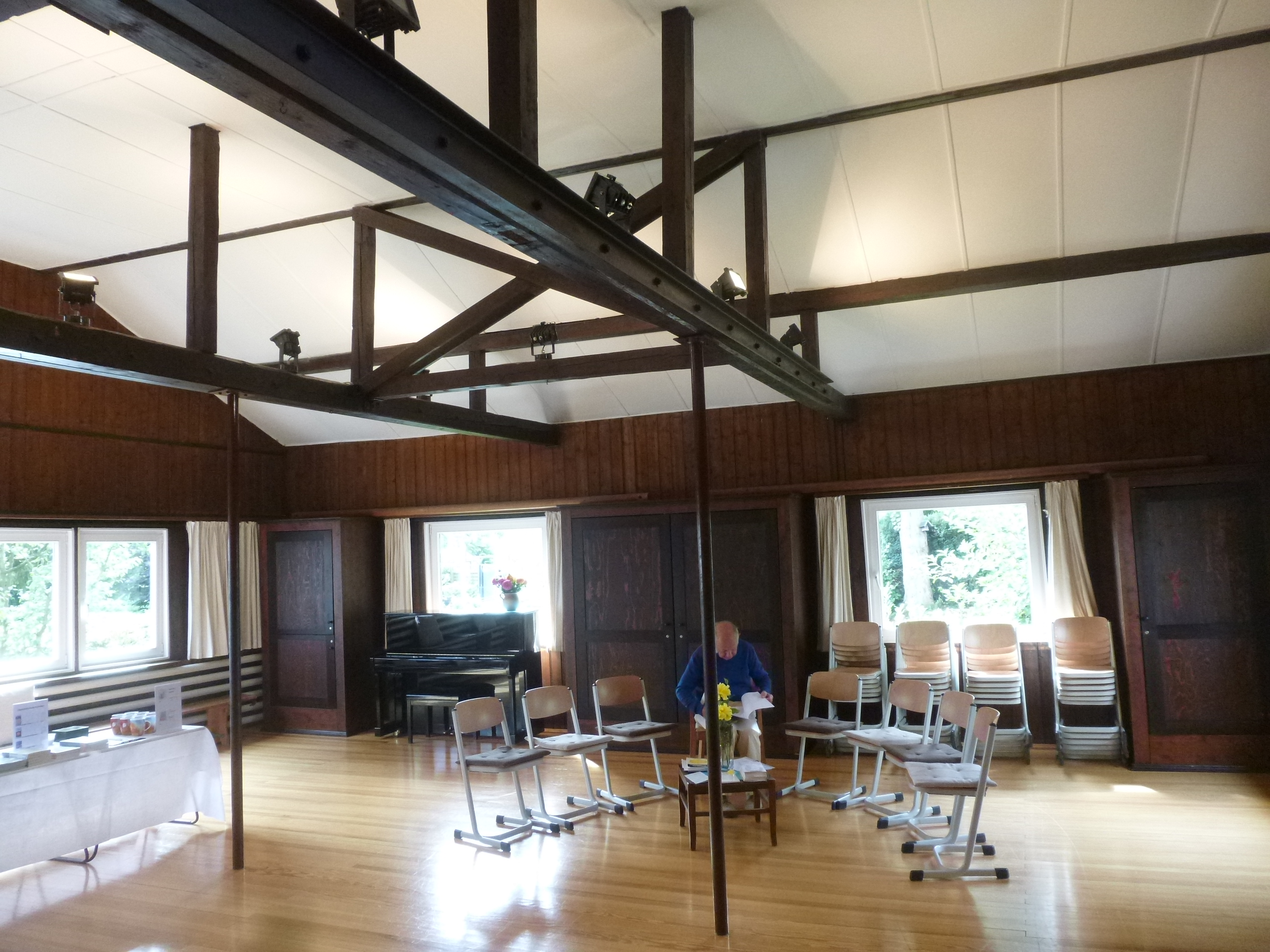
Multi-purpose room with piano (2018)

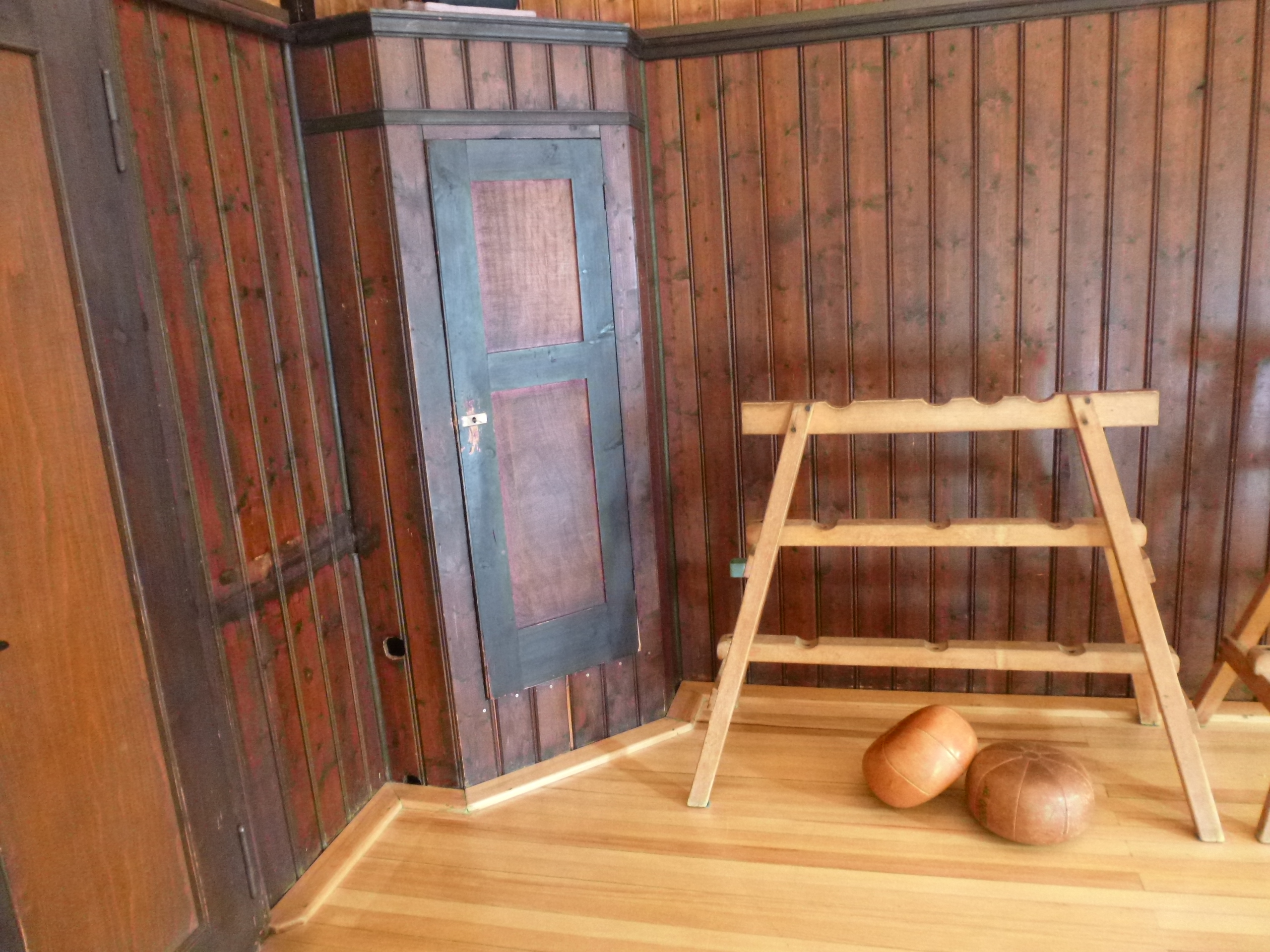
Geräte (2018)

Dore Jacobs was the daughter of the Jewish lawyer and philosopher Ernst Marcus and his wife Berta (née Auerbach, 1869–1918), founder of an association for the defense of women's rights. She studied mathematics and physics in Heidelberg and at the Émile Jaques-Dalcroze school in Dresden-Hellerau. rhythmics and ear training. She took her exams there in 1913, followed by further studies in Bonn. As a student, she also attended lectures by Martin Buber and belonged to the Zionist youth association Blau-Weiß.

In 1914, Dore Marcus married the mathematician, educator and philosopher Artur Jacobs. Together they founded the Bund - Gemeinschaft für sozialistisches Leben. The aim was a way of life in which the whole person should be integrated - body, mind and soul. This also included movement and dance.

In 1925, she founded the Bundesschule für Körperbildung und rhythmische Erziehung (today: Dore-Jacobs-Berufskolleg). The schools were banned and closed in 1934. Dore Jacobs survived underground with the help of the Bund, which continued to operate illegally under the leadership of her husband Artur Jacobs. By September 1944, she - who until then had been considered a privileged Jew - was forced to go into hiding. She and her husband found refuge on Lake Constance in a boarding house run by friends

In the post-war period, which was marked by serious illness, Dore Jacobs concentrated on completing her textbooks on movement education. The school she founded is still run privately today as the Dore-Jacobs-Berufskolleg.

== Writings (selection) ==
- Die menschliche Bewegung. Düsseldorf 1972.
- Bewegungsbildung - Menschenbildung. Düsseldorf 1976.
- Erinnerungen von Dore Jacobs, nach Aufzeichnungen von Dore Jacobs, in: Hermann Schröter (ed.) : Geschichte und Schicksal der Essener Juden : Gedenkbuch für die jüdischen Mitbürger der Stadt Essen. Essen : City of Essen, 1980, pp. 186–192

== Literature ==
- Mark Roseman, EIN MENSCH IN BEWEGUNG. DORE JACOBS (1894 - 1978), in: Essener Beiträge - Beiträge zur Geschichte von Stadt und Stift Essen, Vol. 114, 2002
- Gerd Hergen Lübben, Auf schmalem Grat. For learning and growing from the spirit of truth, art and humanity. Approaches to the pedagogue Artur Jacobs - also with a view to the philosopher Ernst Marcus and the movement artist Dore Jacobs, née Marcus. (PDF; 534 kB) in: "DIE BRÜCKE - Forum für antirassistische Politik und Kultur" (Saarbrücken 2008, issue 147–149).
- Jutta Dick, Marina Sassenberg (eds.): Jüdische Frauen im 19. und 20. Jahrhundert. Lexikon zu Leben und Werk, Reinbek 1993, ISBN 3-499-16344-6
