= General Jewish Labour Party =

General Jewish Labour Party אלגעמײנע ײדישע ארבעטס-פארטיי Ogólnożydowska Partia Pracy
- Founded: November 1931
- Banned: July 1934
- Merged into: Communist Party of Poland
- Ideology: Socialism
- Political position: Left-wing

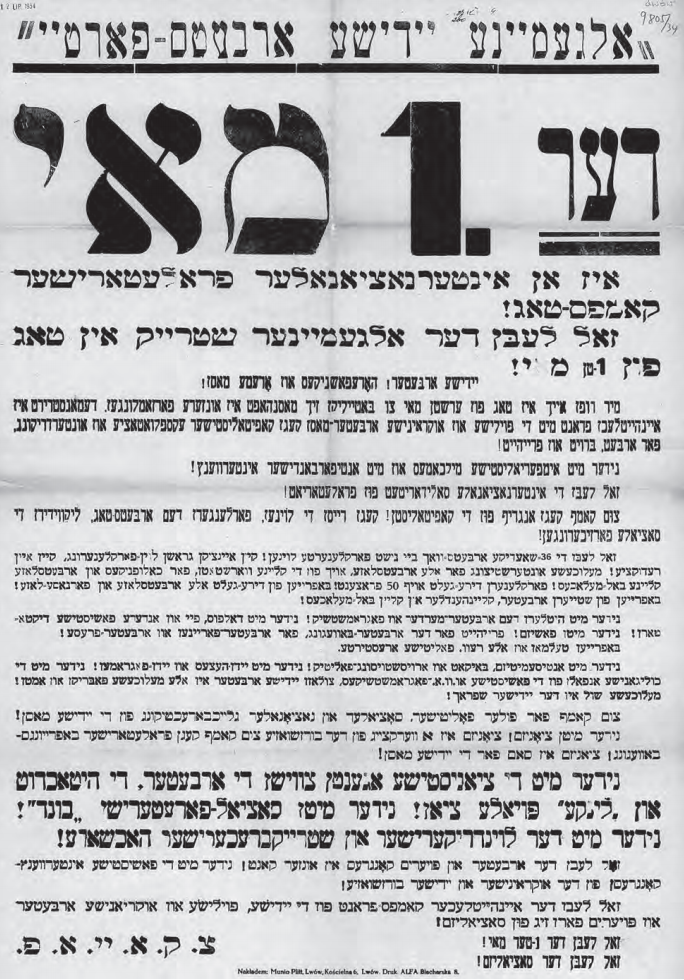
Poster of A.Y.A.P. for May Day 1934

The General Jewish Labour Party (Yiddish: אלגעמײנע ײדישע ארבעטס-פארטיי, romanized: Algemeyne Yidishe Arbets-Partei, abbreviated A.Y.A.P, Polish: Ogólnożydowska Partia Pracy, abbreviated OŻPP) was a Jewish socialist political party in Poland. The party was founded in Lviv in November 1931 by a leftwing group of the General Jewish Labour Bund in Poland in East Galicia, which upheld the idea of dictatorship of the proletariat, a faction of the Poale Zion Left and young left-wing Zionists. The party was aligned with the Communist Party of Poland. The party called for a workers' government, equality for Jewish working people, education in Yiddish language for Jewish children in state schools, abolition of discrimination in the labour market and to struggle against anti-semitism.

The party was led by Zigmunt Stein.

The party was banned by the Ministry of Interior on July 16, 1934, a move welcomed by mainstream Jewish leaders in East Galicia. Several activists of the party were imprisoned for being members of the party. The party later merged into the Communist Party of Poland.
