= Tabaseyn-e Pain =

Village in South Khorasan province, Iran

Tabaseyn-e Pain Persian: طبسين پائين
- Village
- Location within Iran
- Coordinates: 31°26′15″N 60°40′57″E
- Country: Iran
- Province: South Khorasan
- County: Nehbandan
- District: Central
- Rural District: Bandan

Population (2016)
  - Total: 568
- Time zone: UTC+3:30 (IRST)

Tabaseyn-e Pain (Persian: طبسين پائين) (Note: Also romanized as Ţabaseyn-e Pā’īn; also known as Ţabasān, Ţabaseyn, Ţabaseyn-e Soflá, Ţabasīn, and Tabbasein) is a village in Bandan Rural District of the Central District in Nehbandan County, South Khorasan province, Iran.

== Demographics ==
=== Population ===
At the time of the 2006 National Census, the village's population was 925 in 171 households. The following census in 2011 counted a population of 827 people in 191 households. The 2016 census measured the population of the village as 568 people in 146 households.
