= Bandan Rural District =

Rural district in South Khorasan province, Iran

Bandan Rural District Persian: دهستان بندان
- Rural District
- Location within Iran
- Coordinates: 31°33′N 60°37′E
- Country: Iran
- Province: South Khorasan
- County: Nehbandan
- District: Central
- Established: 1987
- Capital: Hajat mine

Population (2016)
  - Total: 6,736
- Time zone: UTC+3:30 (IRST)

Bandan Rural District (Persian: دهستان بندان) is in the Central District of Nehbandan County, South Khorasan province, Iran. It is administered from the Hajat mine.

== Demographics ==
=== Population ===
At the time of the 2006 National Census, the rural district's population was 9,494 in 1,880 households. There were 7,693 inhabitants in 1,777 households at the following census of 2011. The 2016 census measured the population of the rural district as 6,736 in 1,625 households. The most populous of its 82 villages was Bandan, with 1,019 people.

=== Other localities in the rural district ===
- Aliabad-e Chah-e Shand
- Chah-e Buk
- Chah-e Deghal
- Do Kuhaneh
- Mohammadabad
- Tabaseyn-e Bala
- Tabaseyn-e Pain
