= Bund: Gemeinschaft für ein sozialistisches Leben =

The Bund: Gemeinschaft für ein sozialistisches Leben (Union for a Socialist Life) was a German Socialist organization founded in 1924 by Artur Jacobs. His wife, Dore Jacobs, created within this "Bund" a method of physical education which became a mode of resistance under Nazism and is still taught in Germany, in the same place in which it originated.

The Bund consisted of several hundred core members and many other participants trying to implement an objectively ethical standard of living in Germany. With the rise of the Nazi Party in 1933, they became certain that racism and anti-Semitism lay at the core of Nazism. They also realized they were too small to fight it at an institutional level, and so they engaged in practical efforts to make life better for all Jews, and especially for their own Jewish members. Through their efforts they saved the lives of several Jews. They all survived the Nazi period, but their numbers dwindled after World War II. Some members were recognized for their efforts as Righteous Among the Nations by Yad Vashem in 2005. They are considered important by the United States Holocaust Museum for illuminating the range of possibilities affecting German Jews before World War II.
