= Ban Dan =

Ban Dan may refer to several places in Thailand:

- Ban Dan District, Buriram
  - Ban Dan, Ban Dan, a subdistrict
- Ban Dan, Aranyaprathet
- Ban Dan, Ban Dan Lan Hoi
- Ban Dan, Uttaradit
