= Bandan, Nehbandan =

Village in South Khorasan province, Iran

Bandan Persian: بندان
- Village
- Location within Iran
- Coordinates: 31°23′10″N 60°43′47″E
- Country: Iran
- Province: South Khorasan
- County: Nehbandan
- District: Central
- Rural District: Bandan

Population (2016)
  - Total: 1,019
- Time zone: UTC+3:30 (IRST)

Bandan (Persian: بندان) (Note: Also romanized as Bandān) is a village in Bandan Rural District of the Central District in Nehbandan County, South Khorasan province, Iran.

== Demographics ==
=== Population ===
At the time of the 2006 National Census, the village's population was 946 in 222 households. The following census in 2011 counted 972 people in 254 households. The 2016 census measured the population of the village as 1,019 people in 235 households, the most populous in its rural district.
