= Bandhan, Vikramgad =

Village in Maharashtra

Bandhan
- village
- Location in Maharashtra, India Bandhan (India)
- Coordinates: 19.7868466°N 73.0390519°E
- Country: India
- State: Maharashtra
- District: Palghar
- Taluka: Vikramgad
- Elevation: 49 m (161 ft)

Population (2011)
  - Total: 1,474
- Time zone: UTC+5:30 (IST)
- 2011 census code: 551807

Bandhan is a village in the Palghar district of Maharashtra, India. It is located in the Vikramgad taluka.

== Demographics ==
According to the 2011 census of India, Bandhan has 274 households. The effective literacy rate (i.e. the literacy rate of population excluding children aged 6 and below) is 64.43%.

Demographics (2011 Census)
	Total	Male	Female
Population	1474	743	731
Children aged below 6 years	209	104	105
Scheduled caste	0	0	0
Scheduled tribe	1411	711	700
Literates	815	465	350
Workers (all)	802	411	391
Main workers (total)	496	254	242
Main workers: Cultivators	380	191	189
Main workers: Agricultural labourers	82	44	38
Main workers: Household industry workers	13	6	7
Main workers: Other	21	13	8
Marginal workers (total)	306	157	149
Marginal workers: Cultivators	20	11	9
Marginal workers: Agricultural labourers	273	134	139
Marginal workers: Household industry workers	6	6	0
Marginal workers: Others	7	6	1
Non-workers	672	332	340
