= Bandhu =

Sanskrit word

Bandhu (1), Sanskrit for friend, connected with bandhana or ties, which are the connections that, according to the Vedas, link the outer and the inner worlds. Vedic texts speak, for example, of the 360 bones of the fetus that fuse into the 206 bones of the adult (after the 360 days of the year).

As per Dharma traditions, 'Bandhutva' exists in all planes/fields, connecting them together. Few noteworthy fields are Nrittya (Dance), Sangeeta (Music), Jyotishya (Astrology), Vastu-Shastra, Yoga, and Ayurveda (Medicine).
