= Tabaseyn-e Bala =

Village in South Khorasan province, Iran

Tabaseyn-e Bala Persian: طبسين بالا
- Village
- Location within Iran
- Coordinates: 31°27′07″N 60°40′09″E
- Country: Iran
- Province: South Khorasan
- County: Nehbandan
- District: Central
- Rural District: Bandan

Population (2016)
  - Total: 423
- Time zone: UTC+3:30 (IRST)

Tabaseyn-e Bala (Persian: طبسين بالا) (Note: Also romanized as Ţabaseyn-e Bālā; also known as Ţabaseyn-e ‘Olyā) is a village in Bandan Rural District of the Central District in Nehbandan County, South Khorasan province, Iran.

== Demographics ==
=== Population ===
At the time of the 2006 National Census, the village's population was 1,044 in 183 households. The following census in 2011 counted a population of 861 people in 182 households. The 2016 census measured the population of the village as 423 people in 112 households.
