= Badgaon Bandh =

Badgaon Bandh kanta wali Badgaon
- Village
- Nickname: Badgoan
- Location in Rajasthan, India Badgaon Bandh (India)
- Coordinates: 24.7175°N 74.0263°E
- Country: India
- State: Rajasthan
- District: Udaipur

Government
  - Body: Sarpanch (Mrs. Ravina Jat w/o Dilip Jat )
- Elevation: 502 m (1,647 ft)

Population (2011)
  - Total: 2,657

Languages
  - Official: Hindi
- Time zone: UTC+5:30 (IST)
- PIN: 313205
- STD: 02955
- ISO 3166 code: RJ-IN
- Vehicle registration: RJ-27
- Sex ratio: 1000/1019♂/♀

Badgaon Bandh is a village in Mavli tehsil of Udaipur district in the Indian state of Rajasthan.

== Occupation ==
Main occupation of people is agriculture and government/private jobs. Some villagers are employed in government services and many people are doing private jobs in other states and 10-15 villagers job in Dubai and other countries

== Temple and holy places ==
Main Temple in this village is Shree Charbhuja Ji Temple ( Thakur Ji ) . The temple is situated in the centar of the village . This temple is biggest in nearby temple of other nearby villages. Two small temples also created in the temple, one is God shiva and other is God Hanuman. There are two elephant statue created both site of main gate. The main gates are made of steel. Now this temple is famous for its glass creativity .

- God Shiva's Temple (Back site of Charbhuja Ji Temple)
- Goddess Chamunda Mata Temple (Left Site of charbhuja Ji Temple)
- Teja Ji Temple
- Dharmraj Ji Temple (Front site of charbhuja Ji Temple)
- Rebari Baoji Temple
- Radaji Baoji
- Bheruji Baoji
- Kalaji Baoji
- Sethiyo ki Sati Mata

== Transport ==
Badgaon Bandh is connected to nearby villages through the road network with Private Bus Services which link it to Udaipur, Mavli, Fatehnagar, vallabhnagar, Akola.Badgoan kanta link with road network in east kir ki choki, weat mavli, north fatehnagar and south menar ka bangla.

== Demographics ==
As of 2011 State Census, Badgaon had a population of 2657. Male population is 1316, while female population is 1341. Sex ratio of Badgaon village is 1019 which is higher than Rajasthan state average of 928 . And literacy rate of Badgaon village is 46.59% while male literacy is 64.16% and female literacy is 29.77% .
