= Asadabad =

Asadabad may refer to:

== Afghanistan ==
- Asadabad, Afghanistan, capital of Kunar Province
- Asadabad District, district of Kunar Province, Afghanistan

== Azerbaijan ==
- Asadabad, Jalilabad, Azerbaijan
- Əsədabad, Azerbaijan

== Iran ==
=== Ardabil Province ===
- Asadabad, Ardabil, a village in Meshgin Shahr County

=== Chaharmahal and Bakhtiari Province ===
- Asadabad, Chaharmahal and Bakhtiari, a village in Shahrekord County

=== Fars Province ===
- Asadabad, Kazerun, a village in Kazerun County
- Asadabad-e Lateh Kuh, a village in Kazerun County
- Asadabad, Sepidan, a village in Sepidan County

=== Hamadan Province ===
- Asadabad, Iran, a city in Hamadan Province
- Asadabad, Nahavand, a village in Nahavand County
- Asadabad County

=== Ilam Province ===
- Asadabad-e Sofla, Ilam, a village in Darreh Shahr County
- Asadabad-e Vosta, Ilam, a village in Darreh Shahr County

=== Isfahan Province ===
- Asadabad, Isfahan, a village in Isfahan County
- Asadabad-e Bala, Isfahan, a village in Kashan County
- Asadabad, Mobarakeh, a village in Mobarakeh County
- Asadabad, Nain, a village in Nain County
- Asadabad, Semirom, a village in Semirom County

=== Kerman Province ===
- Asadabad, Anar, a village in Anar County
- Asadabad-e Rahnama, a village in Anar County
- Asadabad-e Anguri, a village in Fahraj County
- Asadabad, Narmashir, a village in Narmashir County
- Asadabad, Rafsanjan, a village in Rafsanjan County

=== Kermanshah Province ===
- Asadabad, Kermanshah, a village in Kermanshah County
- Asadabad, Sahneh, a village in Sahneh County

=== Khuzestan Province ===
- Asadabad, Khuzestan, a village in Behbahan County
- Asadabad, Andika, a village in Andika County

=== Kurdistan Province ===
- Asadabad, Kurdistan, a village in Kamyaran County

=== Lorestan Province ===
- Asadabad, Firuzabad, a village in Lorestan Province
- Asadabad, Rumeshkhan, a village in Lorestan Province
- Asadabad, Selseleh, a village in Lorestan Province
- Asadabad, Tarhan, a village in Lorestan Province
- Asadabad-e Chenar, a village in Lorestan Province
- Asadabad-e Olya, Selseleh, a village in Lorestan Province
- Asadabad-e Sofla, Lorestan, a village in Lorestan Province
- Asadabad-e Vosta, Delfan, a village in Lorestan Province
- Asadabad-e Vosta, Selseleh, a village in Lorestan Province

=== Markazi Province ===
- Asadabad, Khomeyn, a village in Khomeyn County
- Asadabad, Khondab, a village in Khondab County
- Asadabad, Mahallat, a village in Mahallat County

=== Mazandaran Province ===
- Asadabad, Savadkuh, a village in Savadkuh County
- Asadabad, Tonekabon, a village in Tonekabon County

=== Qazvin Province ===
- Asadabad, Qazvin, a village in Qazvin Province
- Asadabad-e Khurin, a village in Qazvin Province

=== Razavi Khorasan Province ===
- Asadabad, Kalat, a village in Kalat County
- Asadabad, Khvaf, a village in Khvaf County
- Asadabad, Sarakhs, a village in Sarakhs County
- Asadabad-e Darband, a village in Taybad County
- Asadabad, Jolgeh Rokh, a village in Torbat-e Heydarieh County

=== Semnan Province ===
- Asadabad, Semnan, a village in Semnan County

=== South Khorasan Province ===
- Asadabad, South Khorasan, a village in Nehbandan County
- Asadabad, Shusef, a village in Nehbandan County
- Asadabad-e Arab, a village in Nehbandan County

=== Tehran Province ===
- Asadabad, Varamin, a village in Varamin County

=== Yazd Province ===
- Asadabad, Yazd, a village in Abarkuh County
- Asadabad-e Bala, Yazd, a village in Abarkuh County
- Asadabad-e Pain, a village in Abarkuh County

=== Zanjan Province ===
- Asadabad, Abhar, a village in Abhar County
- Asadabad, Soltaniyeh, a village in Abhar County
