= Asadabad-e Sofla =

Asadabad-e Sofla (Persian: اسدآباد سفلي) may refer to:

- Asadabad-e Sofla, Ilam
- Asadabad-e Sofla, Lorestan
- Asadabad-e Sofla, Firuzabad, Lorestan Province
- Asadabad-e Sofla, Yazd
