= Asadabad-e Vosta =

Asadabad-e Vosta (Persian: اسدآباد وسطي) may refer to:

- Asadabad-e Vosta, Ilam
- Asadabad-e Vosta, Delfan, Lorestan Province
- Asadabad-e Vosta, Selseleh, Lorestan Province
