= Kushkecheh =

Village in Isfahan province, Iran

Kushkecheh Persian: كوشكچه
- Village
- Location within Iran
- Coordinates: 32°24′05″N 51°35′23″E
- Country: Iran
- Province: Isfahan
- County: Mobarakeh
- District: Garkan-e Jonubi
- Rural District: Garkan

Population (2016)
  - Total: 1,116
- Time zone: UTC+3:30 (IRST)

Kushkecheh (Persian: كوشكچه) (Note: Also romanized as Kūshkecheh; also known as Koshkīcheh, Kūshk-e Kūchak, and Kūshkgīcheh) is a village in Garkan Rural District (Note: Formerly Garkan-e Jonubi Rural District) of Garkan-e Jonubi District in Mobarakeh County, Isfahan province, Iran.

== Demographics ==
=== Population ===
At the time of the 2006 National Census, the village's population was 1,081 in 282 households. The following census in 2011 counted 1,141 people in 334 households. The 2016 census measured the population of the village as 1,116 people in 368 households.
