= Varpay =

Varpay (Persian: ورپاي), also rendered as Varpa or Varapa or Warpa, may refer to:

- Varpay-e Olya
- Varpay-e Sofla
