= Zudan =

Village in Isfahan province, Iran

Zudan Persian: زودان
- Village
- Location within Iran
- Coordinates: 32°26′26″N 51°34′43″E
- Country: Iran
- Province: Isfahan
- County: Mobarakeh
- District: Garkan-e Jonubi
- Rural District: Garkan

Population (2016)
  - Total: 1,289
- Time zone: UTC+3:30 (IRST)

Zudan (Persian: زودان) (Note: Also romanized as Zūdān; in Armenian: Զուդուն) is a village in Garkan Rural District (Note: Formerly Garkan-e Jonubi Rural District) of Garkan-e Jonubi District in Mobarakeh County, Isfahan province, Iran.

== Demographics ==
=== Population ===
At the time of the 2006 National Census, the village's population was 1,063 in 276 households. The following census in 2011 counted 1,161 people in 331 households. The 2016 census measured the population of the village as 1,289 people in 373 households.
