= Ahmadabad, Mobarakeh =

Village in Isfahan province, Iran

Ahmadabad Persian: احمداباد
- Village
- Location within Iran
- Coordinates: 32°25′51″N 51°35′12″E
- Country: Iran
- Province: Isfahan
- County: Mobarakeh
- District: Garkan-e Jonubi
- Rural District: Garkan

Population (2016)
  - Total: 1,405
- Time zone: UTC+3:30 (IRST)

Ahmadabad (Persian: احمداباد) (Note: Also romanized as Aḩmadābād) is a village in Garkan Rural District (Note: Formerly Garkan-e Jonubi Rural District) of Garkan-e Jonubi District in Mobarakeh County, Isfahan province, Iran.

== Demographics ==
=== Population ===
At the time of the 2006 National Census, the village's population was 1,325 in 336 households. The following census in 2011 counted 1,418 people in 414 households. The 2016 census measured the population of the village as 1,405 people in 424 households.
