= Jowharestan =

Village in Isfahan province, Iran

Jowharestan Persian: جوهرستان
- Village
- Location within Iran
- Coordinates: 32°24′00″N 51°37′04″E
- Country: Iran
- Province: Isfahan
- County: Mobarakeh
- District: Garkan-e Jonubi
- Rural District: Nurabad

Population (2016)
  - Total: 938
- Time zone: UTC+3:30 (IRST)

Jowharestan (Persian: جوهرستان) (Note: Also romanized as Jowharestān; also known as Jowharestan-e Pā’īn, Jowharestān-e Pā’īn, Jowharestān-e Soflá, and Jowharestān-e Soflī) is a village in Nurabad Rural District of Garkan-e Jonubi District in Mobarakeh County, Isfahan province, Iran.

== Demographics ==
=== Population ===
At the time of the 2006 National Census, the village's population was 884 in 226 households. The following census in 2011 counted 986 people in 282 households. The 2016 census measured the population of the village as 938 people in 278 households.
