= Qaleh Sefid, Isfahan =

Village in Isfahan province, Iran

Qaleh Sefid Persian: قلعه سفيد
- Village
- Location within Iran
- Coordinates: 32°13′44″N 51°28′57″E
- Country: Iran
- Province: Isfahan
- County: Mobarakeh
- District: Central
- Rural District: Talkhuncheh

Population (2016)
  - Total: 197
- Time zone: UTC+3:30 (IRST)

Qaleh Sefid (Persian: قلعه سفيد) (Note: Also romanized as Qal‘eh Safīd, Qal‘eh Sefīd, and Qal‘eh-ye Safīd) is a village in Talkhuncheh Rural District of the Central District in Mobarakeh County, Isfahan province, Iran.

== Demographics ==
=== Population ===
At the time of the 2006 National Census, the village's population was 190 in 51 households. The following census in 2011 counted 185 people in 52 households. The 2016 census measured the population of the village as 197 people in 66 households.
