= Jushan, Isfahan =

Village in Isfahan province, Iran

Jushan Persian: جوشان
- Village
- Location within Iran
- Coordinates: 32°25′37″N 51°34′34″E
- Country: Iran
- Province: Isfahan
- County: Mobarakeh
- District: Garkan-e Jonubi
- Rural District: Garkan

Population (2016)
  - Total: 548
- Time zone: UTC+3:30 (IRST)

Jushan (Persian: جوشان) (Note: Also romanized as Jūshān) is a village in Garkan Rural District (Note: Formerly Garkan-e Jonubi Rural District) of Garkan-e Jonubi District in Mobarakeh County, Isfahan province, Iran.

== Demographics ==
=== Population ===
At the time of the 2006 National Census, the village's population was 537 in 149 households. The following census in 2011 counted 482 people in 148 households. The 2016 census measured the population of the village as 548 people in 172 households.
