= Turak =

Turak may refer to:

- Turac, a comic character
- Turak, Iran, a village in Khuzestan Province
- Turak, South Khorasan, a village in South Khorasan Province
