= Howz-e Mahi =

Village in Isfahan province, Iran

Howz-e Mahi Persian: حوض ماهي
- Village
- Location within Iran
- Coordinates: 32°09′28″N 51°26′59″E
- Country: Iran
- Province: Isfahan
- County: Mobarakeh
- District: Central
- Rural District: Talkhuncheh

Population (2016)
  - Total: 462
- Time zone: UTC+3:30 (IRST)

Howz-e Mahi (Persian: حوض ماهي) (Note: Also romanized as Hauz-i-Māhi, Ḩowz Māhī, and Ḩowẕ-e Māhī) is a village in Talkhuncheh Rural District of the Central District in Mobarakeh County, Isfahan province, Iran.

== Demographics ==
=== Population ===
At the time of the 2006 National Census, the village's population was 462 in 110 households. The following census in 2011 counted 476 people in 130 households. The 2016 census measured the population of the village as 462 people in 133 households, the most populous in its rural district.
