= Khorramabad, Mobarakeh =

Village in Isfahan province, Iran

Khorramabad Persian: خرم اباد
- Village
- Location within Iran
- Country: Iran
- Province: Isfahan
- County: Mobarakeh
- District: Garkan-e Jonubi
- Rural District: Nurabad

Population (2016)
  - Total: 120
- Time zone: UTC+3:30 (IRST)

Khorramabad (Persian: خرم اباد) (Note: Also romanized as Khorramābād) is a village in Nurabad Rural District of Garkan-e Jonubi District in Mobarakeh County, Isfahan province, Iran.

== Demographics ==
=== Population ===
At the time of the 2006 National Census, the village's population was 64 in 13 households. The village did not appear in the following census of 2011. The 2016 census measured the population of the village as 120 people in 39 households.
