= Haratomeh =

Village in Isfahan province, Iran

Haratomeh Persian: بارچان
- Village
- Location within Iran
- Coordinates: 32°25′47″N 51°34′16″E
- Country: Iran
- Province: Isfahan
- County: Mobarakeh
- District: Garkan-e Jonubi
- Rural District: Garkan

Population (2016)
  - Total: 1,033
- Time zone: UTC+3:30 (IRST)

Haratomeh (Persian: هراتمه) (Note: Also romanized as Harātameh and Harātomeh; also known as Hartuman) is a village in Garkan Rural District (Note: Formerly Garkan-e Jonubi Rural District) of Garkan-e Jonubi District in Mobarakeh County, Isfahan province, Iran.

== Demographics ==
=== Population ===
At the time of the 2006 National Census, the village's population was 1,335 in 360 households. The following census in 2011 counted 1,397 people in 416 households. The 2016 census measured the population of the village as 1,033 people in 344 households.
