= Asadabad, Azerbaijan =

Asadabad, Azerbaijan may refer to:

- Asadabad, Jalilabad
- Əsədabad
