= Lav, Iran =

Village in Isfahan province, Iran

Lav Persian: لاو
- Village
- Location within Iran
- Coordinates: 32°11′45″N 51°27′19″E
- Country: Iran
- Province: Isfahan
- County: Mobarakeh
- District: Central
- Rural District: Talkhuncheh

Population (2016)
  - Total: 222
- Time zone: UTC+3:30 (IRST)

Lav (Persian: لاو) (Note: Also romanized as Lāv; also known as Lū) is a village in Talkhuncheh Rural District of the Central District in Mobarakeh County, Isfahan province, Iran.

== Demographics ==
=== Population ===
At the time of the 2006 National Census, the village's population was 232 in 63 households. The following census in 2011 counted 213 people in 64 households. The 2016 census measured the population of the village as 222 people in 72 households.
