= Bagh-e Malek, Isfahan =

Village in Isfahan province, Iran

Bagh-e Malek Persian: باغ ملك
- Village
- Location within Iran
- Coordinates: 32°23′42″N 51°35′47″E
- Country: Iran
- Province: Isfahan
- County: Mobarakeh
- District: Garkan-e Jonubi
- Rural District: Nurabad

Population (2016)
  - Total: 1,901
- Time zone: UTC+3:30 (IRST)

Bagh-e Malek (Persian: باغ ملك) (Note: Also romanized as Bāgh Malek, Bāgh-e Malek, and Bāghmalek) is a village in, and the capital of, Nurabad Rural District in Garkan-e Jonubi District of Mobarakeh County, Isfahan province, Iran. The previous capital of the rural district was the village of Deh Sorkh, now a city.

== Demographics ==
=== Population ===
At the time of the 2006 National Census, the village's population was 1,645 in 435 households. The following census in 2011 counted 1,716 people in 514 households. The 2016 census measured the population of the village as 1,901 people in 623 households.
