= Boruzad =

Village in Isfahan province, Iran

Boruzad Persian: بروزاد
- Village
- Location within Iran
- Coordinates: 32°26′27″N 51°36′29″E
- Country: Iran
- Province: Isfahan
- County: Mobarakeh
- District: Garkan-e Jonubi
- Rural District: Nurabad

Population (2016)
  - Total: 694
- Time zone: UTC+3:30 (IRST)

Boruzad (Persian: بروزاد) (Note: Also romanized as Borūzād; in Armenian: Բորուզարդ) is a village in Nurabad Rural District of Garkan-e Jonubi District in Mobarakeh County, Isfahan province, Iran.

== Demographics ==
=== Population ===
At the time of the 2006 National Census, the village's population was 720 in 191 households. The following census in 2011 counted 742 people in 211 households. The 2016 census measured the population of the village as 694 people in 222 households.
