= Abru, Isfahan =

Village in Isfahan province, Iran

Abru Persian: ابرو
- Village
- Location within Iran
- Coordinates: 32°10′15″N 51°27′10″E
- Country: Iran
- Province: Isfahan
- County: Mobarakeh
- District: Central
- Rural District: Talkhuncheh

Population (2016)
  - Total: 344
- Time zone: UTC+3:30 (IRST)

Abru (Persian: ابرو) (Note: Also romanized as Āb Row and Ābrū; also known as Abrao) is a village in Talkhuncheh Rural District of the Central District in Mobarakeh County, Isfahan province, Iran.

== Demographics ==
=== Population ===
At the time of the 2006 National Census, the village's population was 329 in 77 households. The following census in 2011 counted 375 people in 100 households. The 2016 census measured the population of the village as 344 people in 99 households.
