= Mazraehcheh =

Village in Isfahan province, Iran

Mazraehcheh Persian: مزرعه چه
- Village
- Location within Iran
- Coordinates: 32°25′13″N 51°33′37″E
- Country: Iran
- Province: Isfahan
- County: Mobarakeh
- District: Central
- Rural District: Dizicheh

Population (2016)
  - Total: 367
- Time zone: UTC+3:30 (IRST)

Mazraehcheh (Persian: مزرعه چه) (Note: Also romanized as Mazra‘ehcheh; also known as Mazraecheh and Mazra‘echeh) is a village in Dizicheh Rural District of the Central District in Mobarakeh County, Isfahan province, Iran.

== Demographics ==
=== Population ===
At the time of the 2006 National Census, the village's population was 452 in 126 households. The following census in 2011 counted 440 people in 128 households. The 2016 census measured the population of the village as 367 people in 117 households.
