= Akbarabad, Mobarakeh =

Village in Isfahan province, Iran

Akbarabad Persian: اكبراباد
- Village
- Location within Iran
- Coordinates: 32°25′32″N 51°36′46″E
- Country: Iran
- Province: Isfahan
- County: Mobarakeh
- District: Garkan-e Jonubi
- Rural District: Nurabad

Population (2016)
  - Total: 252
- Time zone: UTC+3:30 (IRST)

Akbarabad (Persian: اكبراباد) (Note: Also romanized as Akbarābād) is a village in Nurabad Rural District of Garkan-e Jonubi District in Mobarakeh County, Isfahan province, Iran.

== Demographics ==
=== Population ===
At the time of the 2006 National Census, the village's population was 245 in 69 households. The following census in 2011 counted 217 people in 65 households. The 2016 census measured the population of the village as 252 people in 91 households.
