= Surcheh-ye Bala =

Village in Isfahan province, Iran

Surcheh-ye Bala Persian: سورچه بالا
- Village
- Location within Iran
- Coordinates: 32°20′09″N 51°24′57″E
- Country: Iran
- Province: Isfahan
- County: Mobarakeh
- District: Central
- Rural District: Karkevand

Population (2016)
  - Total: 266
- Time zone: UTC+3:30 (IRST)

Surcheh-ye Bala (Persian: سورچه بالا) (Note: Also romanized as Sūrcheh-ye Bālā) is a village in Karkevand Rural District of the Central District in Mobarakeh County, Isfahan province, Iran.

== Demographics ==
=== Population ===
At the time of the 2006 National Census, the village's population was 289 in 69 households. The following census in 2011 counted 291 people in 84 households. The 2016 census measured the population of the village as 266 people in 93 households.
