= Dastgerd-e Mehr Avaran =

Village in Isfahan province, Iran

Dastgerd-e Mehr Avaran Persian: دستگردمهراوران
- Village
- Location within Iran
- Coordinates: 32°24′30″N 51°35′04″E
- Country: Iran
- Province: Isfahan
- County: Mobarakeh
- District: Garkan-e Jonubi
- Rural District: Garkan

Population (2016)
  - Total: 1,086
- Time zone: UTC+3:30 (IRST)

Dastgerd-e Mehr Avaran (Persian: دستگردمهراوران) (Note: Also romanized as Dastgerd-e Mehr Āvarān; also known as Dastgerd and Dastjerd-e Mehr Āvarān) is a village in Garkan Rural District (Note: Formerly Garkan-e Jonubi Rural District) of Garkan-e Jonubi District in Mobarakeh County, Isfahan province, Iran.

== Demographics ==
=== Population ===
At the time of the 2006 National Census, the village's population was 1,004 in 273 households. The following census in 2011 counted 1,046 people in 325 households. The 2016 census measured the population of the village as 1,086 people in 349 households.
