= Mirabad, Mobarakeh =

Village in Isfahan province, Iran

Mirabad Persian: ميراباد
- Village
- Location within Iran
- Coordinates: 32°26′13″N 51°36′41″E
- Country: Iran
- Province: Isfahan
- County: Mobarakeh
- District: Garkan-e Jonubi
- Rural District: Nurabad

Population (2016)
  - Total: 293
- Time zone: UTC+3:30 (IRST)

Mirabad (Persian: ميراباد) (Note: Also romanized as Mīrābād) is a village in Nurabad Rural District of Garkan-e Jonubi District in Mobarakeh County, Isfahan province, Iran.

== Demographics ==
=== Population ===
At the time of the 2006 National Census, the village's population was 266 in 68 households. The following census in 2011 counted 312 people in 83 households. The 2016 census measured the population of the village as 293 people in 83 households.
