= Fakhrabad, Mobarakeh =

Village in Isfahan province, Iran

Fakhrabad Persian: فخراباد
- Village
- Location within Iran
- Coordinates: 32°24′57″N 51°34′37″E
- Country: Iran
- Province: Isfahan
- County: Mobarakeh
- District: Garkan-e Jonubi
- Rural District: Garkan

Population (2016)
  - Total: 1,862
- Time zone: UTC+3:30 (IRST)

Fakhrabad (Persian: فخراباد) (Note: Also romanized as Fakhrābād) is a village in Garkan Rural District (Note: Formerly Garkan-e Jonubi Rural District) of Garkan-e Jonubi District in Mobarakeh County, Isfahan province, Iran.

== Demographics ==
=== Population ===
At the time of the 2006 National Census, the village's population was 1,545 in 404 households. The following census in 2011 counted 1,561 people in 470 households. The 2016 census measured the population of the village as 1,862 people in 591 households, the most populous in its rural district.
