= Hasanabad-e Tang Bidkan =

Village in Isfahan province, Iran

Hasanabad-e Tang Bidkan Persian: حسن اباد تنگ بيدكان
- Village
- Location within Iran
- Coordinates: 32°18′05″N 51°23′25″E
- Country: Iran
- Province: Isfahan
- County: Mobarakeh
- District: Central
- Rural District: Karkevand

Population (2016)
  - Total: 3,279
- Time zone: UTC+3:30 (IRST)

Hasanabad-e Tang Bidkan (Persian: حسن ابادتنگ بيدكان) (Note: Also romanized as Ḩasanābād-e Tang Bīdkān; also known as Ḩasanābād and Ḩasanābād-e Bīdkān) is a village in Karkevand Rural District of the Central District in Mobarakeh County, Isfahan province, Iran.

== Demographics ==
=== Population ===
At the time of the 2006 National Census, the village's population was 3,024 in 808 households. The following census in 2011 counted 3,209 people in 960 households. The 2016 census measured the population of the village as 3,279 people in 1,040 households, the most populous in its rural district.
