= Arazi, Isfahan =

Village in Isfahan province, Iran

Arazi Persian: اراضي
- Village
- Location within Iran
- Coordinates: 32°24′04″N 51°36′29″E
- Country: Iran
- Province: Isfahan
- County: Mobarakeh
- District: Garkan-e Jonubi
- Rural District: Nurabad

Population (2016)
  - Total: 1,707
- Time zone: UTC+3:30 (IRST)

Arazi (Persian: اراضي) (Note: Also romanized as Arāẕī) is a village in Nurabad Rural District of Garkan-e Jonubi District in Mobarakeh County, Isfahan province, Iran.

== Demographics ==
=== Population ===
At the time of the 2006 National Census, the village's population was 1,743 in 450 households. The following census in 2011 counted 1,699 people in 485 households. The 2016 census measured the population of the village as 1,707 people in 525 households.
