= Asadabad-e Olya =

Asadabad-e Olya (Persian: اسدآباد عليا) may refer to:

- Asadabad-e Olya, Selseleh, Lorestan Province
- Asadabad-e Olya, Yazd
