= Polyacryl Iran Corporation =

Iranian company

Polyacryl Iran Corporation otherwise Isfahan Polyacryl Corporation is an Iranian public producer and distributor of artificial fibers and polyester products. It was founded in 1953-1972 through DuPont Dunmore . It has five plants in Esfahan, called Acrylic اکریلیک . It has an SNIA license. It worked with textile manufacturers. It had 2200 workers and personnels before foreclosures and bankruptcies. It had 15000 stockholders and was located at 45 kilometers in Isfahan-Mobarekeh road.
