= Asadabad, Mobarakeh =

Village in Isfahan province, Iran

Asadabad Persian: اسداباد
- Village
- Location within Iran
- Coordinates: 32°23′44″N 51°38′20″E
- Country: Iran
- Province: Isfahan
- County: Mobarakeh
- District: Garkan-e Jonubi
- Rural District: Nurabad

Population (2016)
  - Total: 498
- Time zone: UTC+3:30 (IRST)

Asadabad (Persian: اسداباد) (Note: Also romanized as Asadābād) is a village in Nurabad Rural District of Garkan-e Jonubi District in Mobarakeh County, Isfahan province, Iran.

== Demographics ==
=== Population ===
At the time of the 2006 National Census, the village's population was 518 in 141 households. The following census in 2011 counted 491 people in 143 households. The 2016 census measured the population of the village as 498 people in 160 households.
