= Bodaghabad, Isfahan =

Village in Isfahan province, Iran

Bodaghabad Persian: بداغ اباد
- Village
- Location within Iran
- Coordinates: 32°22′24″N 51°27′25″E
- Country: Iran
- Province: Isfahan
- County: Mobarakeh
- District: Central
- Rural District: Dizicheh

Population (2016)
  - Total: 866
- Time zone: UTC+3:30 (IRST)

Bodaghabad (Persian: بداغ اباد) (Note: Also romanized as Bodāghābād) is a village in Dizicheh Rural District of the Central District in Mobarakeh County, Isfahan province, Iran.

== Demographics ==
=== Population ===
At the time of the 2006 National Census, the village's population was 738 in 205 households. The following census in 2011 counted 778 people in 244 households. The 2016 census measured the population of the village as 866 people in 295 households, the most populous in its rural district.
