= Barchan, Iran =

Village in Isfahan province, Iran

Barchan Persian: بارچان
- Village

- Location within Iran
- Coordinates: 32°24′05″N 51°35′04″E
- Country: Iran
- Province: Isfahan
- County: Mobarakeh
- District: Garkan-e Jonubi
- Rural District: Garkan

Population (2016)
  - Total: 722
- Time zone: UTC+3:30 (IRST)

Barchan (Persian: بارچان) (Note: Also romanized as Bārchān; also known as Bārchūn) is a village in Garkan Rural District (Note: Formerly Garkan-e Jonubi Rural District) of Garkan-e Jonubi District in Mobarakeh County, Isfahan province, Iran.

== Demographics ==
=== Population ===
At the time of the 2006 National Census, the village's population was 657 in 169 households. The following census in 2011 counted 632 people in 178 households. The 2016 census measured the population of the village as 722 people in 210 households.
