= Majlesi, Isfahan =

City in Isfahan province, Iran

Majlesi Persian: مجلسی
- City
- Location within Iran
- Coordinates: 32°11′37″N 51°30′02″E
- Country: Iran
- Province: Isfahan
- County: Mobarakeh
- District: Central
- Elevation: 1,790 to 1,840 m (5,870 to 6,040 ft)

Population (2016)
  - Total: 9,363
- Time zone: UTC+3:30 (IRST)

Majlesi (Persian: مجلسی) (Note: Formerly Shahrak-e Majlesi (شهرک مجلسی), also romanized as Shahrak-e Majlesī; also known as Shahr-e Jadid-e Majlesi and Shahr-e Majlesī) is a city in the Central District of Mobarakeh County, Isfahan province, Iran.

== Demographics ==
=== Population ===
At the time of the 2006 National Census, the population was 2,659 in 662 households, when it was listed as the village of Shahrak-e Majlesi in Talkhuncheh Rural District. The following census in 2011 counted 4,083 people in 1,098 households, by which time the village was listed as the city of Majlesi. The 2016 census measured the population of the city as 9,363 people in 2,784 households.
