= Bodaghabad =

Bodaghabad (Persian: بداغ اباد) may refer to:

- Bodaghabad, Isfahan
- Bodaghabad, Razavi Khorasan
