= Rahnama =

Rahnema, Rahnama or Rāhnamā (Persian: رهنما) may refer to:

- Tafsir Rahnama, contemporary 20 volume exegesis on Qur'an in Persian
- Rahnāmag, medieval Persian sea voyage manuscripts (periplus)

== People ==
- Majid Rahnema (1924–2015), Iranian diplomat and politician
- Fereydoun Rahnema (1939–1975), Iranian film director and poet
- Ali Rahnema (born 1952), Iranian economist and historian
- Ali Rahnama (futsal player) (born 1985), Iranian futsal player
- Bahareh Rahnama (born 1973), Iranian actress
- Hossein Rahnama (born 1980), academic entrepreneur and innovator

== Places ==
- Rahnama Mahalleh
- Asadabad-e Rahnama, village in Bayaz Rural District
