= Yurka =

Yurka may refer to:

- Yurka, Iran, a village
- 8781 Yurka, an asteroid
- Blanche Yurka, an American actress
