= Mobarakeh =

City in Isfahan province, Iran

Mobarakeh مباركه
- City
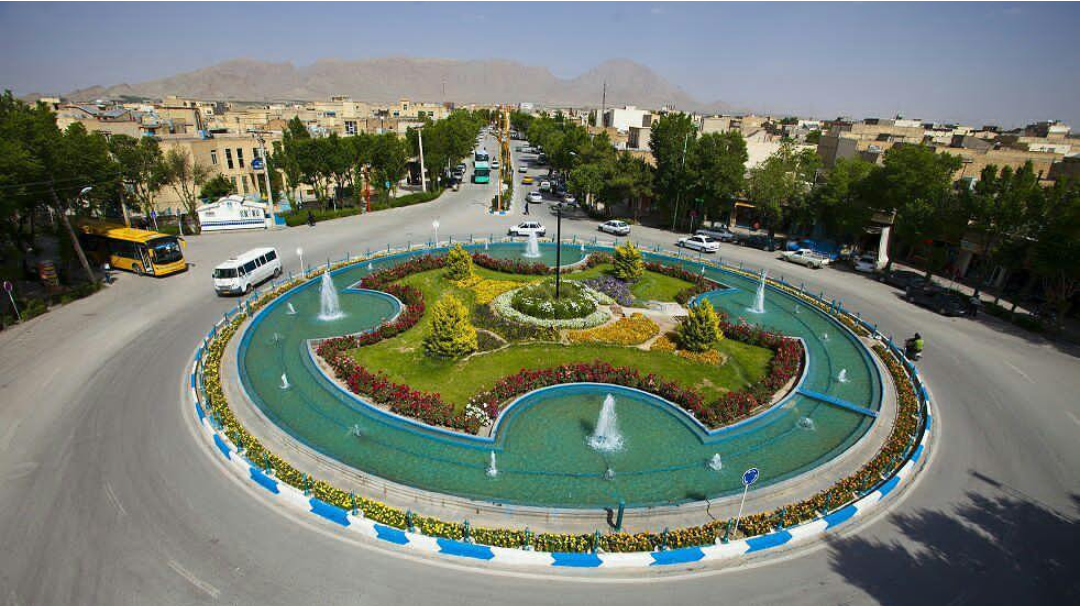

- Location within Iran
- Coordinates: 32°20′58″N 51°30′00″E
- Country: Iran
- Province: Isfahan
- County: Mobarakeh
- District: Central

Population (2016)
  - Total: 69,449
- Time zone: UTC+3:30 (IRST)

Mobarakeh (Persian: مباركه) (Note: Also romanized as Mobārakeh; also known as Mubārakeh) is a city in the Central District of Mobarakeh County, Isfahan province, Iran, serving as capital of both the county and the district.

== Demographics ==
=== Population ===
At the time of the 2006 National Census, the city's population was 62,454 in 16,583 households. The following census in 2011 counted 66,092 people in 19,545 households. The 2016 census measured the population of the city as 69,449 people in 21,676 households.

== Industry ==
Mobarakeh Steel Company (MSC, Persian: فولاد مبارکه, Foolad Mobarakeh) is an Iranian steel company, located 65 km south west of Esfahan, near the city of Mobarakeh. It is Iran's largest steel maker, and one of the largest industrial complexes operating in Iran. It was first commissioned after the Iranian Revolution in 1979 by the Saririans and officially initiated operations during 1993. Underwent major revamping during year 2000, and was scheduled for a second and third revamping in 2009–2010, bringing the total steel output to 7,200,000 metric tons per year. The company owns the successful football club, F.C. Sepahan.

== Natural and cultural attractions ==
The natural attractions of this city are: Tang Dozan Spring, Hoz Mahi Spring, Nekoabad Dam, Pir Hajat Tomb, Bazi Castle, Bazi Castle Historical Caves, Serarud Coastal Park Groves, Sanjadi Spring, Laila Spring and Hassan Abad Bidgan Qanat, Amin Abad Qanat, Tank Bidkan Spring, Kerkund Spring, Daulat Abad Water Mill and 500 year old tree in Diziche city.

More than 800 works of history have been identified in Mobarakeh city, of which 35 have been registered in the list of National works of Iran. In the investigations carried out on the old structure of Mobarakeh city, after knowing the old existing neighborhoods and determining its limits, it has been determined that the most modern urban structure in the world today was founded in this city many years ago.
