= Asadabad-e Arab =

Asadabad-e Arab اسدابادعرب
- Village
- Location within Iran
- Coordinates: 31°52′32″N 59°55′05″E
- Country: Iran
- Province: South Khorasan
- County: Nehbandan
- Bakhsh: Shusef
- Rural District: Shusef

Population (2006)
  - Total: 72
- Time zone: UTC+3:30 (IRST)
  - Summer (DST): UTC+4:30 (IRDT)

Asadabad-e Arab (Persian: اسدابادعرب, also Romanized as Asadābād-e Arab; also known as Asadābād and Kalāt-e Asadābād) is a village in Shusef Rural District, Shusef District, Nehbandan County, South Khorasan Province, Iran. At the 2006 census, its population was 72, consisting of 20 families.
