= Zahab-e Sofla =

Village in South Khorasan province, Iran

Zahab-e Sofla Persian: زهاب سفلي
- Village
- Location within Iran
- Coordinates: 31°52′20″N 60°08′47″E
- Country: Iran
- Province: South Khorasan
- County: Nehbandan
- District: Shusef
- Rural District: Shusef

Population (2016)
  - Total: 374
- Time zone: UTC+3:30 (IRST)

Zahab-e Sofla (Persian: زهاب سفلي) (Note: Also romanized as Z̄ahāb-e Soflá) is a village in Shusef Rural District of Shusef District in Nehbandan County, South Khorasan province, Iran.

== Demographics ==
=== Population ===
The village did not appear in the 2006 National Census. The following census in 2011 counted 383 people in 106 households. The 2016 census measured the population of the village as 374 people in 91 households.
