= Zibashahr =

City in Isfahan province, Iran

Zibashahr Persian: زيباشهر
- City
- Location within Iran
- Coordinates: 32°23′16″N 51°34′01″E
- Country: Iran
- Province: Isfahan
- County: Mobarakeh
- District: Garkan-e Jonubi
- Established as a city: 2002

Population (2016)
  - Total: 10,200
- Time zone: UTC+3:30 (IRST)

Zibashahr (Persian: زيباشهر) (Note: Formerly the village of Khulenjan (خولنجان), also romanized as Khavlanjān, Khūlenjān, and Khvolenjān) is a city in, and the capital of, Garkan-e Jonubi District in Mobarakeh County, Isfahan province, Iran. It also serves as the administrative center for Garkan Rural District. (Note: Formerly Garkan-e Jonubi Rural District)

== History ==
In 2002, the village of Khulenjan, after merging with the villages of Adergan (آدرگان) and Lenaj (لنج) , was converted to a city and renamed Zibashahr.

== Demographics ==
=== Population ===
At the time of the 2006 National Census, the city's population was 9,071 in 2,466 households. The following census in 2011 counted 9,668 people in 2,881 households. The 2016 census measured the population of the city as 10,200 people in 3,163 households.
