= Mohammadabad-e Razzaqzadeh =

Village in South Khorasan province, Iran

Mohammadabad-e Razzaqzadeh Persian: محمدابادرزاق زاده
- Village
- Location within Iran
- Coordinates: 31°43′39″N 60°04′36″E
- Country: Iran
- Province: South Khorasan
- County: Nehbandan
- District: Shusef
- Rural District: Shusef

Population (2016)
  - Total: 124
- Time zone: UTC+3:30 (IRST)

Mohammadabad-e Razzaqzadeh (Persian: محمدابادرزاق زاده) (Note: Also romanized as Moḩammadābād Razzāqzādeh and Moḩammadābād-e Razzāqzādeh; also known as Moḩammadābād) is a village in Shusef Rural District of Shusef District in Nehbandan County, South Khorasan province, Iran.

== Demographics ==
=== Population ===
At the time of the 2006 National Census, the village's population was 127 in 44 households. The following census in 2011 counted 122 people in 40 households. The 2016 census measured the population of the village as 124 people in 42 households.
