= Yurtga =

Yurtga يورتگا
- Village
- Location within Iran
- Coordinates: 32°50′47″N 52°44′02″E
- Country: Iran
- Province: Isfahan
- County: Nain
- Bakhsh: Central
- Rural District: Kuhestan

Population (2006)
  - Total: 18
- Time zone: UTC+3:30 (IRST)
  - Summer (DST): UTC+4:30 (IRDT)

Yurtga (Persian: يورتگا, also Romanized as Yūrtgā; also known as Yūrgā and Yūrkā) is a village in Kuhestan Rural District, in the Central District of Nain County, Isfahan Province, Iran. At the 2006 census, its population was 18, in 6 families.
