= Hoseynabad-e Asheq =

Village in Isfahan province, Iran

Hoseynabad-e Asheq Persian: حسين ابادعاشق
- Village
- Location within Iran
- Coordinates: 32°52′04″N 52°51′59″E
- Country: Iran
- Province: Isfahan
- County: Nain
- District: Central
- Rural District: Kuhestan

Population (2016)
  - Total: 67
- Time zone: UTC+3:30 (IRST)

Hoseynabad-e Asheq (Persian: حسين ابادعاشق) (Note: Also romanized as Ḩoseynābād ‘Āsheq and Ḩoseynābād-e ‘Asheq; also known as Hosein Abad Ashegh, Ḩoseynābād, Ḩoseynābād-e Khān, and Husainābād) is a village in Kuhestan Rural District of the Central District in Nain County, Isfahan province, Iran.

== Demographics ==
=== Population ===
At the time of the 2006 National Census, the village's population was 57 in 18 households. The following census in 2011 counted 42 people in 16 households. The 2016 census measured the population of the village as 67 people in 25 households.
