= Dizicheh Rural District =

Rural district in Isfahan province, Iran

Dizicheh Rural District Persian: دهستان ديزيچه
- Rural District
- Location within Iran
- Coordinates: 32°24′N 51°30′E
- Country: Iran
- Province: Isfahan
- County: Mobarakeh
- District: Central
- Established: 1987
- Capital: Dizicheh

Population (2016)
  - Total: 1,233
- Time zone: UTC+3:30 (IRST)

Dizicheh Rural District (Persian: دهستان ديزيچه) is in the Central District of Mobarakeh County, Isfahan province, Iran. It is administered from the city of Dizicheh.

== Demographics ==
=== Population ===
At the time of the 2006 National Census, the rural district's population was 1,192 in 332 households. There were 1,218 inhabitants in 372 households at the following census of 2011. The 2016 census measured the population of the rural district as 1,233 in 412 households. The mot populous of its 10 villages was Bodaghabad, with 866 people.

=== Other villages in the rural district ===
- Mazraehcheh
