= Khunik-e Olya =

Village in South Khorasan province, Iran

Khunik-e Olya Persian: خونيك عليا
- Village
- Location within Iran
- Coordinates: 31°45′04″N 60°00′50″E
- Country: Iran
- Province: South Khorasan
- County: Nehbandan
- District: Shusef
- Rural District: Shusef

Population (2016)
  - Total: 202
- Time zone: UTC+3:30 (IRST)

Khunik-e Olya (Persian: خونيك عليا) (Note: Also romanized as Khūnīk-e ‘Olyā; also known as Khūnīk, Khūnik Bāla, and Khūnīk-e Bālā) is a village in Shusef Rural District of Shusef District in Nehbandan County, South Khorasan province, Iran.

== Demographics ==
=== Population ===
At the time of the 2006 National Census, the village's population was 125 in 50 households. The following census in 2011 counted 90 people in 38 households. The 2016 census measured the population of the village as 202 people in 66 households.
