= Garkan Rural District =

Rural district in Isfahan province, Iran

Garkan Rural District Persian: دهستان گركن
- Rural District
- Location within Iran
- Coordinates: 32°22′N 51°37′E
- Country: Iran
- Province: Isfahan
- County: Mobarakeh
- District: Garkan-e Jonubi
- Established: 1987
- Capital: Zibashahr

Population (2016)
  - Total: 9,296
- Time zone: UTC+3:30 (IRST)

Garkan Rural District (Persian: دهستان گركن) (Note: Formerly Garkan-e Jonubi Rural District (دهستان گرکن جنوبی)) is in Garkan-e Jonubi District of Mobarakeh County, Isfahan province, Iran. It is administered from the city of Zibashahr. (Note: Formerly the village of Khulenjan)

== Demographics ==
=== Population ===
At the time of the 2006 National Census, the rural district's population was 8,892 in 2,344 households. There were 9,532 inhabitants in 2,806 households at the following census of 2011. The 2016 census measured the population of the rural district as 9,296 in 2,904 households. The most populous of its 23 villages was Fakhrabad, with 1,862 people.

=== Other villages in the rural district ===
- Ahmadabad
- Barchan
- Dastgerd-e Mehr Avaran
- Haratomeh
- July 7th Residences
- Jushan
- Kushkecheh
- Zudan
