= Karkevand Rural District =

Rural district in Isfahan province, Iran

Karkevand Rural District Persian: دهستان كركوند
- Rural District
- Location within Iran
- Coordinates: 32°15′N 51°23′E
- Country: Iran
- Province: Isfahan
- County: Mobarakeh
- District: Central
- Established: 1987
- Capital: Karkevand

Population (2016)
  - Total: 3,545
- Time zone: UTC+3:30 (IRST)

Karkevand Rural District (Persian: دهستان كركوند) is in the Central District of Mobarakeh County, Isfahan province, Iran. It is administered from the city of Karkevand.

== Demographics ==
=== Population ===
At the time of the 2006 National Census, the rural district's population was 3,341 in 887 households. There were 3,500 inhabitants in 1,044 households at the following census of 2011. The 2016 census measured the population of the rural district as 3,545 in 1,133 households. The most populous of its 29 villages was Hasanabad-e Tang Bidkan, with 3,279 people.

=== Other villages in the rural district ===
- Surcheh-ye Bala
