= Arvar =

Village in Isfahan province, Iran

Arvar Persian: ارور
- Village
- Location within Iran
- Coordinates: 32°48′06″N 52°49′34″E
- Country: Iran
- Province: Isfahan
- County: Nain
- District: Central
- Rural District: Kuhestan

Population (2016)
  - Total: 32
- Time zone: UTC+3:30 (IRST)

Arvar (Persian: ارور) is a village in Kuhestan Rural District of the Central District in Nain County, Isfahan province, Iran.

== Demographics ==
=== Population ===
At the time of the 2006 National Census, the village's population was 30 in 11 households. The following census in 2011 counted 30 people in nine households. The 2016 census measured the population of the village as 32 people in 13 households.
