= Ünəş =

Village in Yardymli Rayon, Azerbaijan

Coordinates: 38.883333°N 48.233333°E

Ünəş is a village in the municipality of Əsədəbad in the Yardymli Rayon of Azerbaijan.
