= Talkhuncheh =

City in Isfahan province, Iran

Talkhuncheh Persian: طالخونچه
- City
- Location within Iran
- Coordinates: 32°15′44″N 51°33′37″E
- Country: Iran
- Province: Isfahan
- County: Mobarakeh
- District: Central
- Established as a city: 1995

Population (2016)
  - Total: 9,924
- Time zone: UTC+3:30 (IRST)

Talkhuncheh (Persian: طالخونچه) (Note: Also Romanized as Ţālkhūncheh and Ţālkhvoncheh) is a city in the Central District of Mobarakeh County, Isfahan province, Iran, serving as the administrative center for Talkhuncheh Rural District. The village of Talkhuncheh was converted to a city in 1995.

== Demographics ==
=== Population ===
At the time of the 2006 National Census, the city's population was 9,307 in 2,536 households. The following census in 2011 counted 9,472 people in 2,835 households. The 2016 census measured the population of the city as 9,924 people in 3,104 households.
