= Kamalabad, Nain =

Village in Isfahan province, Iran

Kamalabad Persian: كمال اباد
- Village
- Location within Iran
- Coordinates: 32°52′40″N 52°43′46″E
- Country: Iran
- Province: Isfahan
- County: Nain
- District: Central
- Rural District: Kuhestan

Population (2016)
  - Total: 122
- Time zone: UTC+3:30 (IRST)

Kamalabad (Persian: كمال اباد) (Note: Also romanized as Kamālābād) is a village in Kuhestan Rural District of the Central District in Nain County, Isfahan province, Iran.

== Demographics ==
=== Population ===
At the time of the 2006 National Census, the village's population was 300 in 74 households. The following census in 2011 counted 182 people in 57 households. The 2016 census measured the population of the village as 122 people in 48 households.
