= Balan, Nain =

Village in Isfahan province, Iran

Balan Persian: بلان
- Village
- Location within Iran
- Coordinates: 32°51′43″N 52°44′27″E
- Country: Iran
- Province: Isfahan
- County: Nain
- District: Central
- Rural District: Kuhestan

Population (2016)
  - Total: 179
- Time zone: UTC+3:30 (IRST)

Balan (Persian: بلان) (Note: Also romanized as Balān) is a village in, and the capital of, Kuhestan Rural District in the Central District of Nain County, Isfahan province, Iran.

== Demographics ==
=== Population ===
At the time of the 2006 National Census, the village's population was 586 in 146 households. The following census in 2011 counted 175 people in 58 households. The 2016 census measured the population of the village as 179 people in 70 households, the most populous in its rural district.
