= Kalateh-ye Khodadad =

Village in South Khorasan province, Iran

Kalateh-ye Khodadad Persian: كلاته خداداد
- Village
- Location within Iran
- Coordinates: 31°51′07″N 59°53′48″E
- Country: Iran
- Province: South Khorasan
- County: Nehbandan
- District: Shusef
- Rural District: Shusef

Population (2016)
  - Total: 141
- Time zone: UTC+3:30 (IRST)

Kalateh-ye Khodadad (Persian: كلاته خداداد) (Note: Also romanized as Kalāteh Khodādād and Kalateh-ye Khodadad; also known as Kalāt-e Khodādād, Khodādād, and Qalāteh Khūdādād) is a village in Shusef Rural District of Shusef District in Nehbandan County, South Khorasan province, Iran.

== Demographics ==
=== Population ===
At the time of the 2006 National Census, the village's population was 236 in 63 households. The following census in 2011 counted 125 people in 50 households. The 2016 census measured the population of the village as 141 people in 51 households.
