= Chah-e Deraz =

Village in South Khorasan province, Iran

Chah-e Deraz Persian: چاهدراز
- Village
- Location within Iran
- Coordinates: 31°58′03″N 59°59′24″E
- Country: Iran
- Province: South Khorasan
- County: Nehbandan
- District: Shusef
- Rural District: Shusef

Population (2016)
  - Total: 254
- Time zone: UTC+3:30 (IRST)

Chah-e Deraz (Persian: چاهدراز) (Note: Also romanized as Chāh-e Derāz) is a village in Shusef Rural District of Shusef District in Nehbandan County, South Khorasan province, Iran.

== Demographics ==
=== Population ===
At the time of the 2006 National Census, the village's population was 289 in 79 households. The following census in 2011 counted 297 people in 92 households. The 2016 census measured the population of the village as 254 people in 78 households.
