= Kalateh-ye Habib, South Khorasan =

Village in South Khorasan province, Iran

Kalateh-ye Habib Persian: كلاته حبيب
- Village
- Country: Iran
- Province: South Khorasan
- County: Nehbandan
- District: Shusef
- Rural District: Shusef

Population (2016)
  - Total: 113
- Time zone: UTC+3:30 (IRST)

Kalateh-ye Habib (Persian: كلاته حبيب) (Note: Also romanized as Kalāteh-ye Ḩabīb) is a village in Shusef Rural District of Shusef District in Nehbandan County, South Khorasan province, Iran.

== Demographics ==
=== Population ===
At the time of the 2006 National Census, the village's population was 47 in 11 households. The following census in 2011 counted 93 people in 26 households. The 2016 census measured the population of the village as 113 people in 33 households.
