= Karkevand =

City in Isfahan province, Iran

Karkevand Persian: كركوند
- City
- Location within Iran
- Coordinates: 32°20′32″N 51°26′48″E
- Country: Iran
- Province: Isfahan
- County: Mobarakeh
- District: Central
- Established as a city: 2000

Population (2016)
  - Total: 7,058
- Time zone: UTC+3:30 (IRST)

Karkevand (Persian: كركوند) (Note: Also known as Garkevand) is a city in the Central District of Mobarakeh County, Isfahan province, Iran serving as the administrative center for Karkevand Rural District.

== History ==
The village of Karkevand, after merging with the villages of Kheyrabad (خیرآباد), Siyahbum (سیاهبوم), and Surcheh-ye Pain (سورچه پایین), was converted to a city in 2000.

== Demographics ==
=== Population ===
At the time of the 2006 National Census, the city's population was 7,002 in 1,891 households. The following census in 2011 counted 6,857 people in 2,031 households. The 2016 census measured the population of the city as 7,058 people in 2,217 households.
