= Arand =

Village in Isfahan province, Iran

Arand Persian: آرند
- Village
- Location within Iran
- Coordinates: 32°50′46″N 52°45′10″E
- Country: Iran
- Province: Isfahan
- County: Nain
- District: Central
- Rural District: Kuhestan

Population (2016)
  - Total: 40
- Time zone: UTC+3:30 (IRST)

Arand (Persian: آرند) (Note: Also romanized as Ārand; also known as Aran) is a village in Kuhestan Rural District of the Central District in Nain County, Isfahan province, Iran.

== Demographics ==
=== Population ===
At the time of the 2006 National Census, the village's population was 50 in 16 households. The following census in 2011 counted 14 people in six households. The 2016 census measured the population of the village as 40 people in 17 households.
