= Deh Sorkh, Isfahan =

City in Isfahan province, Iran

Deh Sorkh Persian: ده سرخ
- City
- Location within Iran
- Coordinates: 32°24′36″N 51°39′53″E
- Country: Iran
- Province: Isfahan
- County: Mobarakeh
- District: Garkan-e Jonubi
- Established as a city: 2019

Population (2016)
  - Total: 3,713
- Time zone: UTC+3:30 (IRST)

Deh Sorkh (Persian: ده سرخ) (Note: Also romanized as Deh-e Sorkh; also known as Deh Surkh) is a city in Garkan-e Jonubi District of Mobarakeh County, Isfahan province, Iran. As a village, it was the capital of Nurabad Rural District until its capital was transferred to the village of Bagh-e Malek.

== Demographics ==
=== Language ===
The city is majority Qashqai-speaking at about 60%, the rest being standard Farsi dialects.

=== Population ===
At the time of the 2006 National Census, Deh Sorkh's population was 3,582 in 873 households, when it was a village in Nurabad Rural District. The following census in 2011 counted 3,837 people in 1,079 households. The 2016 census measured the population of the village as 3,713 people in 1,114 households, the most populous in its rural district.

Deh Sorkh was converted to a city in 2019.
