= Nurabad Rural District (Mobarakeh County) =

Rural district in Isfahan province, Iran

Nurabad Rural District Persian: دهستان نورآباد
- Rural District
- Location within Iran
- Coordinates: 32°25′N 51°42′E
- Country: Iran
- Province: Isfahan
- County: Mobarakeh
- District: Garkan-e Jonubi
- Established: 2000
- Capital: Bagh-e Malek

Population (2016)
  - Total: 10,213
- Time zone: UTC+3:30 (IRST)

Nurabad Rural District (Persian: دهستان نورآباد) is in Garkan-e Jonubi District of Mobarakeh County, Isfahan province, Iran. Its capital is the village of Bagh-e Malek. The previous capital of the rural district was the village of Deh Sorkh, now a city.

== Demographics ==
=== Population ===
At the time of the 2006 National Census, the rural district's population was 9,828 in 2,515 households. There were 13,053 inhabitants in 2,962 households at the following census of 2011. The 2016 census measured the population of the rural district as 10,213 in 3,162 households. The most populous of its 31 villages was Deh Sorkh, with 3,713 people, (now a city).

=== Other villages in the rural district ===
- Akbarabad
- Arazi
- Asadabad
- Boruzad
- Jowharestan
- Khorramabad
- Mirabad
- Sohra Ghazanfariyeh Shomali
