= Talkhuncheh Rural District =

Rural district in Isfahan province, Iran

Talkhuncheh Rural District Persian: دهستان طالخونچه
- Rural District
- Location within Iran
- Coordinates: 32°12′N 51°30′E
- Country: Iran
- Province: Isfahan
- County: Mobarakeh
- District: Central
- Established: 1987
- Capital: Talkhuncheh

Population (2016)
  - Total: 1,225
- Time zone: UTC+3:30 (IRST)

Talkhuncheh Rural District (Persian: دهستان طالخونچه) is in the Central District of Mobarakeh County, Isfahan province, Iran. It is administered from the city of Talkhuncheh.

== Demographics ==
=== Population ===
At the time of the 2006 National Census, the rural district's population was 3,872 in 963 households. There were 1,249 inhabitants in 346 households at the following census of 2011. The 2016 census measured the population of the rural district as 1,225 in 370 households. The most populous of its 35 villages was Howz-e Mahi, with 462 people.

=== Other villages in the rural district ===
- Abru
- Lav
- Qaleh Sefid
