= Shusef Rural District =

Rural district in South Khorasan province, Iran

Shusef Rural District Persian: دهستان شوسف
- Rural District
- Location within Iran
- Coordinates: 31°53′N 60°05′E
- Country: Iran
- Province: South Khorasan
- County: Nehbandan
- District: Shusef
- Established: 1987
- Capital: Shusef

Population (2016)
  - Total: 5,386
- Time zone: UTC+3:30 (IRST)

Shusef Rural District (Persian: دهستان شوسف) is in Shusef District of Nehbandan County, South Khorasan province, Iran. It is administered from the city of Shusef.

== Demographics ==
=== Population ===
At the time of the 2006 National Census, the rural district's population was 6,107 in 1,578 households. There were 5,883 inhabitants in 1,703 households at the following census of 2011. The 2016 census measured the population of the rural district as 5,386 in 1,560 households. The most populous of its 129 villages was Mazar-e Seyyed Ali (now in Sahlabad Rural District of Sardaran District), with 745 people.

=== Other villages in the rural district ===
- Afzalabad
- Chah-e Deraz
- Hoseynabad
- Kalateh-ye Habib
- Kalateh-ye Khodadad
- Khunik-e Olya
- Mohammadabad-e Razzaqzadeh
- Taroq
- Zahab-e Sofla
