= Asadabad, Nain =

Village in Isfahan province, Iran

Asadabad Persian: اسداباد
- Village
- Location within Iran
- Coordinates: 32°52′48″N 52°44′39″E
- Country: Iran
- Province: Isfahan
- County: Nain
- District: Central
- Rural District: Kuhestan

Population (2016)
  - Total: 130
- Time zone: UTC+3:30 (IRST)

Asadabad (Persian: اسداباد) (Note: Also romanized as Asadābād) is a village in Kuhestan Rural District of the Central District in Nain County, Isfahan province, Iran.

== Demographics ==
=== Population ===
At the time of the 2006 National Census, the village's population was 75 in 24 households. The following census in 2011 counted 75 people in 31 households. The 2016 census measured the population of the village as 130 people in 49 households.
