= Afzalabad, Shusef =

Village in South Khorasan province, Iran

Afzalabad Persian: افضل اباد
- Village
- Location within Iran
- Coordinates: 31°53′00″N 60°16′04″E
- Country: Iran
- Province: South Khorasan
- County: Nehbandan
- District: Shusef
- Rural District: Shusef

Population (2016)
  - Total: 172
- Time zone: UTC+3:30 (IRST)

Afzalabad (Persian: افضل اباد) (Note: Also romanized as Afẕalābād; also known as Afẕalābād Sar Kal and Asadābād) is a village in Shusef Rural District of Shusef District in Nehbandan County, South Khorasan province, Iran.

== Demographics ==
=== Population ===
At the time of the 2006 National Census, the village's population was 173 in 34 households. The following census in 2011 counted 274 people in 71 households. The 2016 census measured the population of the village as 172 people in 50 households.
