= Qaleh-ye Asadabad =

Qaleh-ye Asadabad قلعه اسداباد
- Village
- Location within Iran
- Coordinates: 34°24′14″N 49°02′05″E
- Country: Iran
- Province: Markazi
- County: Khondab
- Bakhsh: Central
- Rural District: Deh Chal

Population (2006)
  - Total: 67
- Time zone: UTC+3:30 (IRST)
  - Summer (DST): UTC+4:30 (IRDT)

Qaleh-ye Asadabad (Persian: قلعه اسداباد, also Romanized as Qal’eh-ye As’adabad and Qal‘eh-ye As‘adābād; also known as As‘adābād and Asdābād) is a village in Deh Chal Rural District, in the Central District of Khondab County, Markazi Province, Iran. At the 2006 census, its population was 67, in 18 families.
