= Asadabad-e Anguri =

Asadabad-e Anguri اسدابادانگوري
- Village
- Location within Iran
- Coordinates: 28°46′23″N 58°59′49″E
- Country: Iran
- Province: Kerman
- County: Fahraj
- Bakhsh: Negin Kavir
- Rural District: Chahdegal

Population (2006)
  - Total: 1,041
- Time zone: UTC+3:30 (IRST)
  - Summer (DST): UTC+4:30 (IRDT)

Asadabad-e Anguri (Persian: اسدابادانگوري, also Romanized as Asadābād-e Āngūrī) is a village in Chahdegal Rural District, Negin Kavir District, Fahraj County, Kerman Province, Iran. At the 2006 census, its population was 1,041, in 225 families.
