= Asadabad-e Lateh Kuh =

Asadabad-e Lateh Kuh اسدابادلته كوه
- Village
- Country: Iran
- Province: Fars
- County: Kazerun
- Bakhsh: Jereh and Baladeh
- Rural District: Dadin

Population (2006)
  - Total: 21
- Time zone: UTC+3:30 (IRST)
  - Summer (DST): UTC+4:30 (IRDT)

Asadabad-e Lateh Kuh (Persian: اسدابادلته كوه, also Romanized as Āsadābād-e Lateh Kūh) is a village in Dadin Rural District, Jereh and Baladeh District, Kazerun County, Fars province, Iran. At the 2006 census, its population was 21, in 6 families.
