= Taroq =

Village in South Khorasan province, Iran

Taroq Persian: طارق
- Village
- Location within Iran
- Coordinates: 31°49′18″N 59°56′18″E
- Country: Iran
- Province: South Khorasan
- County: Nehbandan
- District: Shusef
- Rural District: Shusef

Population (2016)
  - Total: 211
- Time zone: UTC+3:30 (IRST)

Taroq (Persian: طارق) (Note: Also romanized as Ţāreq, Ţāroq, and Ţārq; also known as Taregh and Tūrāk) is a village in Shusef Rural District of Shusef District in Nehbandan County, South Khorasan province, Iran.

== Demographics ==
=== Population ===
At the time of the 2006 National Census, the village's population was 280 in 101 households. The following census in 2011 counted 253 people in 107 households. The 2016 census measured the population of the village as 211 people in 90 households.
