= Dizicheh =

City in Isfahan province, Iran

Dizicheh Persian: دیزیچه
- City
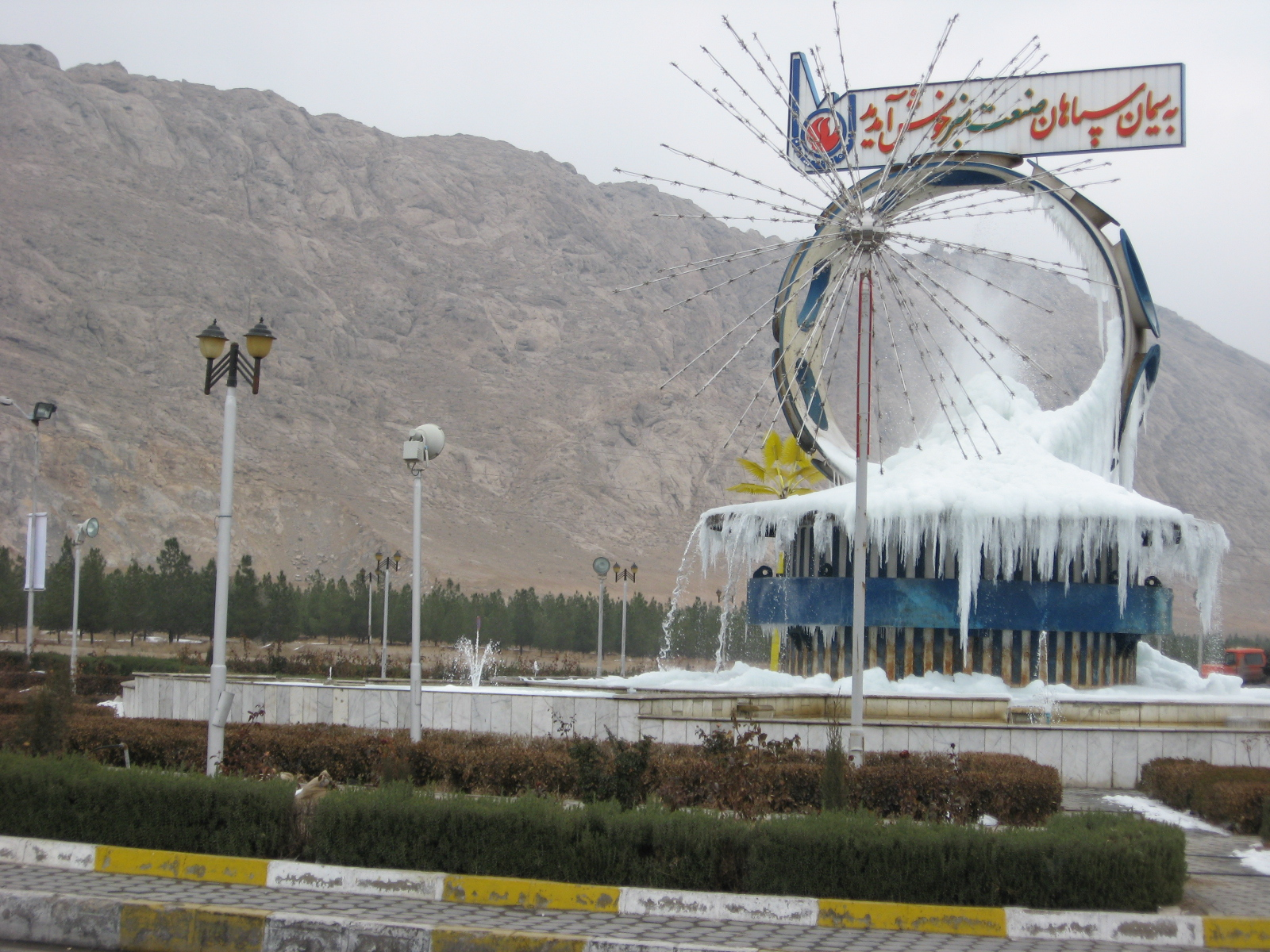

- Location within Iran
- Coordinates: 32°23′13″N 51°30′44″E
- Country: Iran
- Province: Isfahan
- County: Mobarakeh
- District: Central
- Established as a city: 1993

Population (2016)
  - Total: 18,935
- Time zone: UTC+3:30 (IRST)

Dizicheh (Persian: دیزیچه) (Note: Also romanized as Dīzīcheh; also known as Dīzān and Dīzī) is a city in the Central District of Mobarakeh County, Isfahan province, Iran, serving as the administrative center for Dizicheh Rural District. The village of Dizicheh was converted to a city in 1993.

== Demographics ==
=== Population ===
At the time of the 2006 National Census, the city's population was 17,966 in 4,759 households. The following census in 2011 counted 18,750 people in 5,608 households. The 2016 census measured the population of the city as 18,935 people in 6,011 households.
