= Asadabad, Yazd =

Asadabad اسداباد
- Village
- Location within Iran
- Coordinates: 30°56′10″N 53°26′19″E
- Country: Iran
- Province: Yazd
- County: Abarkuh
- Bakhsh: Bahman
- Rural District: Esfandar

Population (2006)
  - Total: 770
- Time zone: UTC+3:30 (IRST)
  - Summer (DST): UTC+4:30 (IRDT)

Asadabad (Persian: اسداباد, also Romanized as Asadābād) is a village in Esfandar Rural District, Bahman District, Abarkuh County, Yazd Province, Iran. At the 2006 census, its population was 770, in 215 families.
