= Varpay-e Olya =

Village in Isfahan province, Iran

Varpay-e Olya Persian: ورپاي عليا
- Village
- Location within Iran
- Coordinates: 32°50′36″N 52°44′01″E
- Country: Iran
- Province: Isfahan
- County: Nain
- District: Central
- Rural District: Kuhestan

Population (2016)
  - Total: 109
- Time zone: UTC+3:30 (IRST)

Varpay-e Olya (Persian: ورپاي عليا) (Note: Also romanized as Varpāy-e ‘Olyā; also known as Varapā-ye Bālā, Varpā, Varpa Olya, Varpā-ye ‘Olyā, and Warpa) is a village in Kuhestan Rural District of the Central District in Nain County, Isfahan province, Iran.

== Demographics ==
=== Population ===
At the time of the 2006 National Census, the village's population was 127 in 47 households. The following census in 2011 counted 101 people in 39 households. The 2016 census measured the population of the village as 109 people in 45 households.
