= Asadabad, Khuzestan =

Asadabad اسداباد
- Village
- Location within Iran
- Coordinates: 30°42′32″N 50°13′17″E
- Country: Iran
- Province: Khuzestan
- County: Behbahan
- Bakhsh: Central
- Rural District: Dodangeh

Population (2006)
  - Total: 1,188
- Time zone: UTC+3:30 (IRST)
  - Summer (DST): UTC+4:30 (IRDT)

Asadabad (Persian: اسداباد, also Romanized as Asadābād) is a village in Dodangeh Rural District, in the Central District of Behbahan County, Khuzestan Province, Iran. At the 2006 census, its population was 1,188, in 223 families.
