= Asadabad, Tarhan =

Asadabad اسداباد
- Village
- Country: Iran
- Province: Lorestan
- County: Kuhdasht
- Bakhsh: Tarhan
- Rural District: Tarhan-e Sharqi

Population (2006)
  - Total: 182
- Time zone: UTC+3:30 (IRST)
  - Summer (DST): UTC+4:30 (IRDT)

Asadabad (Persian: اسداباد, also Romanized as Āsadābād) is a village in Tarhan-e Sharqi Rural District, Tarhan District, Kuhdasht County, Lorestan Province, Iran. At the 2006 census, its population was 182, in 34 families.
