= Asadabad-e Rahnama =

Asadabad-e Rahnama اسداباد رهنما
- Village
- Location within Iran
- Coordinates: 30°47′05″N 55°22′37″E
- Country: Iran
- Province: Kerman
- County: Anar
- Bakhsh: Central
- Rural District: Bayaz

Population (2006)
  - Total: 111
- Time zone: UTC+3:30 (IRST)

Asadabad-e Rahnama (Persian: اسداباد رهنما, also romanized as Asadābād-e Rahnamā) is a village in Bayaz Rural District, in the Central District of Anar County, Kerman Province, Iran. At the 2006 census, its population was 111, in 21 families.
