= Əsədabad =

- Municipality
- Location within Azerbaijan
- Coordinates: 38°53′N 48°14′E
- Country: Azerbaijan
- Rayon: Yardymli

Population
  - Total: 1,137
- Time zone: UTC+4 (AZT)
  - Summer (DST): UTC+5 (AZT)

Əsədabad (also, Əsədəbad, Asadabad, and Abas-Abad) is a village and municipality in the Yardymli Rayon of Azerbaijan. It has a population of 1,137. The municipality consists of the villages of Əsədabad and Ünəş.
