= Asadabad-e Pain =

Asadabad-e Pain اسدابادپايين
- Village
- Location within Iran
- Coordinates: 31°04′31″N 53°19′15″E
- Country: Iran
- Province: Yazd
- County: Abarkuh
- Bakhsh: Bahman
- Rural District: Mehrabad

Population (2006)
  - Total: 218
- Time zone: UTC+3:30 (IRST)
  - Summer (DST): UTC+4:30 (IRDT)

Asadabad-e Pain (Persian: اسدابادپايين, also Romanized as Asadābād-e Pā’īn; also known as Asadābād-e Soflá, Asadābād-e Soflā, and Asadābād-i-Khān) is a village in Mehrabad Rural District, Bahman District, Abarkuh County, Yazd Province, Iran. At the 2006 census, its population was 218, in 71 families.
