= Asadabad-e Vosta, Selseleh =

Asadabad-e Vosta اسد آباد وسطي
- Village
- Location within Iran
- Coordinates: 33°52′00″N 48°00′01″E
- Country: Iran
- Province: Lorestan
- County: Selseleh
- Bakhsh: Firuzabad
- Rural District: Firuzabad

Population (2006)
  - Total: 62
- Time zone: UTC+3:30 (IRST)
  - Summer (DST): UTC+4:30 (IRDT)

Asadabad-e Vosta (Persian: اسد آباد وسطي, also Romanized as Asadābād-e Vostá) is a village in Firuzabad Rural District, Firuzabad District, Selseleh County, Lorestan Province, Iran. At the 2006 census, its population was 62, in 16 families.
