= Asadabad, Jalilabad =

Asadabad
- Location within Azerbaijan
- Coordinates: 39°04′11″N 48°34′26″E
- Country: Azerbaijan
- Rayon: Jalilabad
- Time zone: UTC+4 (AZT)

Asadabad also Asad-Abad is a village in the Jalilabad Rayon of Azerbaijan.
