= Kuhestan Rural District (Nain County) =

Rural district in Isfahan province, Iran

Kuhestan Rural District Persian: دهستان كوهستان
- Rural District
- Location within Iran
- Coordinates: 32°52′N 52°53′E
- Country: Iran
- Province: Isfahan
- County: Nain
- District: Central
- Established: 1987
- Capital: Balan

Population (2016)
  - Total: 996
- Time zone: UTC+3:30 (IRST)

Kuhestan Rural District (Persian: دهستان كوهستان) is in the Central District of Nain County, Isfahan province, Iran. Its capital is the village of Balan.

== Demographics ==
=== Population ===
At the time of the 2006 National Census, the rural district's population was 1,735 in 551 households. There were 992 inhabitants in 382 households at the following census of 2011. The 2016 census measured the population of the rural district as 996 in 421 households. The most populous of its 102 villages was Balan, with 179 people.

=== Other villages in the rural district ===
- Arand
- Arvar
- Asadabad
- Hoseynabad-e Asheq
- Kamalabad
- Varpay-e Olya
