= Asadabad-e Olya, Selseleh =

Asadabad-e Olya اسدآباد عليا
- Village
- Location within Iran
- Coordinates: 33°52′21″N 47°59′46″E
- Country: Iran
- Province: Lorestan
- County: Selseleh
- Bakhsh: Firuzabad
- Rural District: Firuzabad

Population (2006)
  - Total: 57
- Time zone: UTC+3:30 (IRST)
  - Summer (DST): UTC+4:30 (IRDT)

Asadabad-e Olya (Persian: اسدآباد عليا, also Romanized as Asadābād-e ‘Olyā) is a village in Firuzabad Rural District, Firuzabad District, Selseleh County, Lorestan Province, Iran. At the 2006 census, its population was 57, in 10 families.
