= Asadabad-e Vosta, Delfan =

Asadabad-e Vosta اسدآباد وسطي
- Village
- Location within Iran
- Coordinates: 34°07′58″N 47°54′47″E
- Country: Iran
- Province: Lorestan
- County: Delfan
- Bakhsh: Central
- Rural District: Nurali

Population (2006)
  - Total: 95
- Time zone: UTC+3:30 (IRST)
  - Summer (DST): UTC+4:30 (IRDT)

Asadabad-e Vosta (Persian: اسدآباد وسطي, also Romanized as Asadābād-e Vostá) is a village in Nurali Rural District, in the Central District of Delfan County, Lorestan Province, Iran. At the 2006 census, its population was 95, in 19 families.
