= Asadabad-e Sofla, Lorestan =

Asadabad-e Sofla اسدآباد سفلي
- Village
- Location within Iran
- Coordinates: 34°07′45″N 47°55′03″E
- Country: Iran
- Province: Lorestan
- County: Delfan
- Bakhsh: Central
- Rural District: Nurali

Population (2006)
  - Total: 88
- Time zone: UTC+3:30 (IRST)
  - Summer (DST): UTC+4:30 (IRDT)

Asadabad-e Sofla (Persian: اسدآباد سفلي, also Romanized as Asadābād-e Soflá; also known as Asadābād-e Pā'īn) is a village in Nurali Rural District, in the Central District of Delfan County, Lorestan Province, Iran. At the 2006 census, its population was 88, in 18 families.
