= Asadabad, Firuzabad =

Asadabad اسداباد
- Village
- Location within Iran
- Coordinates: 33°51′43″N 48°00′19″E
- Country: Iran
- Province: Lorestan
- County: Selseleh
- Bakhsh: Firuzabad
- Rural District: Firuzabad

Population (2006)
  - Total: 84
- Time zone: UTC+3:30 (IRST)
  - Summer (DST): UTC+4:30 (IRDT)

Asadabad (Persian: اسداباد, also Romanized as Āsadābād; also known as Asadābād-e Soflá) is a village in Firuzabad Rural District, Firuzabad District, Selseleh County, Lorestan Province, Iran. At the 2006 census, its population was 84, in 15 families.
