= Asadabad-e Vosta, Ilam =

Asadabad-e Vosta اسدابادوسطي
- Village
- Location within Iran
- Coordinates: 33°09′21″N 47°23′31″E
- Country: Iran
- Province: Ilam
- County: Darreh Shahr
- Bakhsh: Central
- Rural District: Aramu

Population (2006)
  - Total: 455
- Time zone: UTC+3:30 (IRST)
  - Summer (DST): UTC+4:30 (IRDT)

Asadabad-e Vosta (Persian: اسدابادوسطي, also Romanized as Asadābād-e Vosţá; also known as Asadābād and Shahīd Madanī) is a village in Aramu Rural District, in the Central District of Darreh Shahr County, Ilam Province, Iran. At the 2006 census, its population was 455, in 87 families. The village is populated by Kurds and Lurs.
