= Central District (Mobarakeh County) =

District in Isfahan province, Iran

Central District (Mobarakeh County) Persian: بخش مرکزی شهرستان مبارکه
- District
- Location within Iran
- Coordinates: 32°15′N 51°27′E
- Country: Iran
- Province: Isfahan
- County: Mobarakeh
- Established: 1990
- Capital: Mobarakeh

Population (2016)
  - Total: 120,732
- Time zone: UTC+3:30 (IRST)

The Central District of Mobarakeh County (Persian: بخش مرکزی شهرستان مبارکه) is in Isfahan province, Iran. Its capital is the city of Mobarakeh.

== History ==
Beginning with the 2011 National Census, the village of Shahrak-e Majlesi was listed as the city of Majlesi.

== Demographics ==
=== Population ===
At the time of the 2006 census, the district's population was 105,134 in 27,951 households. The following census in 2011 counted 111,221 people in 32,879 households. The 2016 census measured the population of the district as 120,732 inhabitants in 37,707 households.

=== Administrative divisions ===
Central District (Mobarakeh County) Population
| Administrative Divisions | 2006 | 2011 | 2016 |
|---|---|---|---|
| Dizicheh RD | 1,192 | 1,218 | 1,233 |
| Karkevand RD | 3,341 | 3,500 | 3,545 |
| Talkhuncheh RD | 3,872 | 1,249 | 1,225 |
| Dizicheh (city) | 17,966 | 18,750 | 18,935 |
| Karkevand (city) | 7,002 | 6,857 | 7,058 |
| Majlesi (city) | | 4,083 | 9,363 |
| Mobarakeh (city) | 62,454 | 66,092 | 69,449 |
| Talkhuncheh (city) | 9,307 | 9,472 | 9,924 |
| Total | 105,134 | 111,221 | 120,732 |
RD = Rural District
