= Garkan-e Jonubi District =

District in Isfahan province, Iran

Garkan-e Jonubi District Persian: بخش گرکن جنوبی
- District
- Location within Iran
- Coordinates: 32°23′N 51°40′E
- Country: Iran
- Province: Isfahan
- County: Mobarakeh
- Established: 2000
- Capital: Zibashahr

Population (2016)
  - Total: 29,709
- Time zone: UTC+3:30 (IRST)

Garkan-e Jonubi District (Persian: بخش گرکن جنوبی) is in Mobarakeh County, Isfahan province, Iran. Its capital is the city of Zibashahr. (Note: Formerly the village of Khulenjan)

== History ==
The village of Deh Sorkh was converted to a city in 2019.

== Demographics ==
=== Population ===
At the time of the 2006 National Census, the district's population was 27,791 in 7,325 households. The following census in 2011 counted 32,253 people in 8,649 households. The 2016 census measured the population of the district as 29,709 inhabitants in 9,229 households.

=== Administrative divisions ===
Garkan-e Jonubi District Population
Administrative Divisions	2006	2011	2016
Garkan RD (Note: Formerly Garkan-e Jonubi Rural District)	8,892	9,532	9,296
Nurabad RD	9,828	13,053	10,213
Deh Sorkh (city) (Note: Became a city after the 2016 census)			
Zibashahr (city)	9,071	9,668	10,200
Total	27,791	32,253	29,709
RD = Rural District
