= Mobarakeh County =

County in Isfahan province, Iran

Mobarakeh County Persian: شهرستان مبارکه
- County
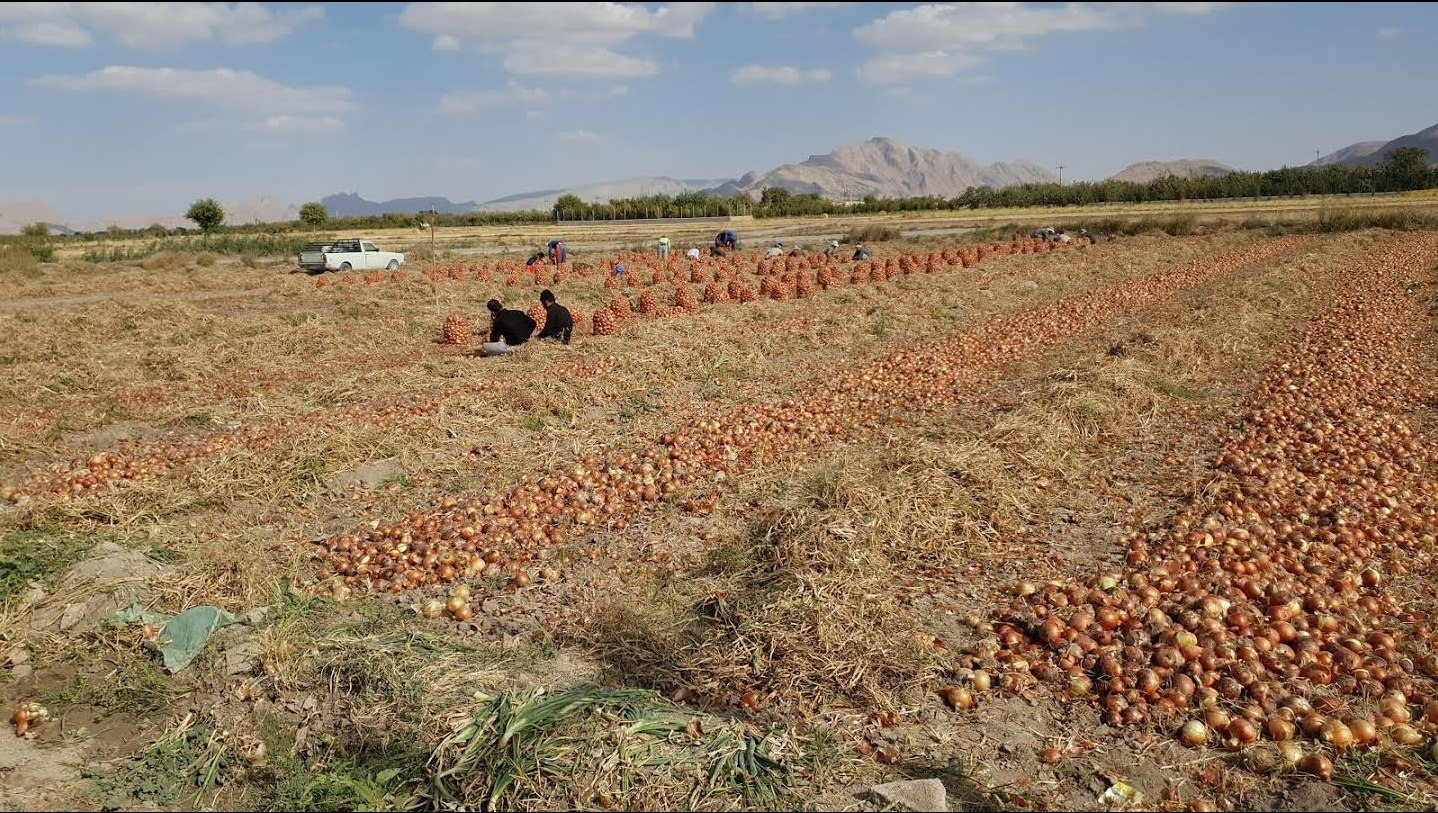
- Harvest in the village of Barchan

- Location of Mobarakeh County in Isfahan province (bottom, purple)

- Location of Isfahan province in Iran
- Coordinates: 32°15′N 51°31′E
- Country: Iran
- Province: Isfahan
- Established: 1990
- Capital: Mobarakeh
- Districts: Central, Garkan-e Jonubi

Population (2016)
  - Total: 150,441
- Time zone: UTC+3:30 (IRST)

Mobarakeh County (Persian: شهرستان مبارکه) is in Isfahan province, Iran. Its capital is the city of Mobarakeh.

== History ==
Beginning with the 2011 National Census, the village of Shahrak-e Majlesi was listed as the city of Majlesi. The village of Deh Sorkh was converted to a city in 2019.

== Demographics ==
=== Population ===
At the time of the 2006 census, the county's population was 132,925 in 35,276 households. The following census in 2011 counted 143,474 people in 41,514 households. The 2016 census measured the population of the county as 150,441 in 46,936 households.

=== Administrative divisions ===
Mobarakeh County's population history and administrative structure over three consecutive censuses are shown in the following table.

Mobarakeh County Population
Administrative Divisions	2006	2011	2016
Central District	105,134	111,221	120,732
Dizicheh RD	1,192	1,218	1,233
Karkevand RD	3,341	3,500	3,545
Talkhuncheh RD	3,872	1,249	1,225
Dizicheh (city)	17,966	18,750	18,935
Karkevand (city)	7,002	6,857	7,058
Majlesi (city)		4,083	9,363
Mobarakeh (city)	62,454	66,092	69,449
Talkhuncheh (city)	9,307	9,472	9,924
Garkan-e Jonubi District	27,791	32,253	29,709
Garkan RD (Note: Formerly Garkan-e Jonubi Rural District)	8,892	9,532	9,296
Nurabad RD	9,828	13,053	10,213
Deh Sorkh (city) (Note: Became a city after the 2016 census)			
Zibashahr (city) (Note: Formerly the village of Khulenjan)	9,071	9,668	10,200
Total	132,925	143,474	150,441
RD = Rural District

== See also ==
Media related to Mobarakeh County at Wikimedia Commons
