= Robat (disambiguation) =

Robat (Persian: رباط), the Farsi variant of Arabic ribat, initially referred to an Early Islamic frontier fort, and later to a caravanserai or Sufi retreat. Some places named Robat are:

== Afghanistan ==
- Robat, Afghanistan

== Iran ==
=== Fars Province ===
- Robat, Fars, a village in Mamasani County

=== Hamadan Province ===
- Robat-e Zafarani, a village in Bahar County
- Robat-e Sheverin, a village in Hamadan County

=== Isfahan Province ===
- Robat-e Abu ol Qasem, a village in Golpayegan County
- Robat-e Mahmud, a village in Golpayegan County
- Robat-e Malek, a village in Golpayegan County
- Robat-e Qaleqan, a village in Golpayegan County
- Robat-e Sorkh-e Olya, a village in Golpayegan County

=== Kerman Province ===
- Robat, Kerman, a village in Kerman County
- Robat, Shahr-e Babak, a village in Shahr-e Babak County

=== Khuzestan Province ===
- Robat-e Olya, Khuzestan, a village in Bagh-e Malek County
- Robat-e Sofla, Khuzestan, a village in Bagh-e Malek County

=== Lorestan Province ===
- Robat, alternate name of Dowlatabad, Khorramabad
- Robat-e Namaki, a village in Khorramabad County
- Robat Rural District (Lorestan Province)

=== Markazi Province ===
- Robat Mil, a village in Arak County
- Robat Tork, a village in Delijan County
- Robat-e Aghaj, a village in Khomeyn County
- Robat-e Aliabad, a village in Khomeyn County
- Robat-e Arjomand, a village in Khomeyn County
- Robat-e Kafsan, a village in Khomeyn County
- Robat-e Morad, a village in Khomeyn County
- Robat-e Olya, Markazi, a village in Khomeyn County
- Robat-e Sofla, Markazi, a village in Khomeyn County

=== North Khorasan Province ===
- Robat, North Khorasan, a village in Shirvan County

=== Razavi Khorasan Province ===
- Robat, Firuzeh, a village in Firuzeh County
- Robat-e Sar Pashideh, a village in Firuzeh County
- Robat, Kalat, a village in Kalat County
- Robat, Zavin, a village in Kalat County
- Robat-e Jaz, a village in Khoshab County
- Robat-e Jaz Rural District, in Khoshab County
- Robat, Mashhad, a village in Mashhad County
- Robat-e Khakestari, a village in Mashhad County
- Robat-e Sharaf, 12th-century ribat
- Robat-e Toroq, a village in Mashhad County
- Robat Sefid, a village in Mashhad County
- Robat-e Sar Push, a village in Sabzevar County
- Robat-e Mian Dasht, a village in Torbat-e Heydarieh County
- Robat, Torbat-e Jam, a village in Torbat-e Jam County
- Robat-e Samangan, a village in Torbat-e Jam County

=== Semnan Province ===
- Robat-e Zang, a village in Shahrud County

=== South Khorasan Province ===
- Robat, South Khorasan, a village in Darmian County
- Robat-e Khan, a village in Tabas County

=== Yazd Province ===
- Robat-e Posht-e Badam, a village in Ardakan County

=== Zanjan Province ===
- Robat, Zanjan, a village in Khodabandeh County

== Turkmenistan ==
- Kizil-Robát ("Red Caravanserai"), Russified to Kizil-Arvát, the ribat that gave its name to Gyzylarbat

== See also ==
- Rabad, Central Asian variant for Semitic word 'rabat'
- Rabat (disambiguation), Semitic word for 'fortified town' or 'suburb'
- Ribat, Arabic word for Early Muslim frontier fort (later caravansary, Sufi retreat), the origin of the Persian word 'robat'
- Ribat-i Malik, also spelled Rabat Malik - a ruined caravanserai on in Uzbekistan
- Robat Rural District (disambiguation)
- Raymond Buckland, also known by the Craft name Robat
