= Zarrin Choqa (disambiguation) =

Zarrin Choqa is a village in Kermanshah Province, Iran.

Zarrin Choqa (Persian: زرين چقا), also rendered as Zarrin Chogha, may also refer to:

- Zarrin Chogha Shahid Jabari, Lorestan Province
- Zarrin Chogha-ye Olya, Lorestan Province
- Zarrin Chogha-ye Sofla, Lorestan Province
