= Rabat (disambiguation) =

Rabat is the capital city of Morocco.

Rabat may also refer to:

== Places ==
=== France ===
- Rabat-les-Trois-Seigneurs, Ariège

=== Iran ===
- Rabat, Iran, a city in West Azerbaijan Province
- Rabat, Urmia, a village in West Azerbaijan Province

=== Jordan (ancient Transjordan) ===
- Rabat Amman, trad. spelling Rabbath Ammon, the capital of ancient Ammon; today's Amman
- Rabat Moab, trad. spelling Rabbath Moab, the capital of ancient Moab; today's Rabba

=== Malta ===
- Rabat, Malta, a city on Malta Island
- Victoria, Gozo, a city on Gozo Island, often referred to by its original name Rabat

=== Pakistan ===
- Rabat, Battagram, town and union council (district)
- Rabat, Lower Dir, union council (district)

=== Turkey ===
- Yeni Rabat, Turkish name of medieval Georgian monastery of Shatberdi from Klarjeti

=== Ukraine (Crimea) ===
- Arabat Fortress

=== Uzbekistan ===
- Rabat Malik, or Ribat-i Malik, a ruined caravanserai on the road from Samarkand to Bukhara

== Other uses ==
- Rabat (clothing), a type of waistcoat worn by certain Catholic clergy
- Rabat (film), a 2011 Dutch film
- Rabat (military rank) (Hebrew acronym), rank in the Israeli army, equivalent to a corporal
- Rabat I (c. 1616–c. 1644/5), ruler of the Kingdom of Sennar (now in Sudan)
- FUS Rabat, a Moroccan football club

== See also ==
=== Semitic terms ===
- Rabad, an alternate spelling for ribat common in Central Asia
- Rabat, meaning lady or goddess, one attribute of Asherah
- Ribat, Arabic word for Early Muslim frontier fort, later caravansary and Sufi retreat
- Robat (disambiguation), the Persian variant of ribat
- Rabbath (disambiguation)

=== French ===
- rabbet, recess or groove, from Old French rabbat/rabbet, "wall recess", and rabattre, "to beat down"
