= Robat-e Olya =

Robat-e Olya or Robat Olya (Persian: رباطعليا) may refer to:

- Robat-e Olya, Khuzestan
- Robat-e Olya, Markazi

== See also ==
- Robat (disambiguation)
- Robat-e Sofla (disambiguation)
