= Robat-e Sofla =

Robat-e Sofla or Robat Sofla (Persian: رباطسفلي) may refer to:

- Robat-e Sofla, Khuzestan
- Robat-e Sofla, Markazi

== See also ==
- Robat (disambiguation)
- Robat-e Olya (disambiguation)
