= Papi Khaldar =

Papi Khaldar (Persian: پاپي خالدار) may refer to:

- Papi Khaldar-e Olya
- Papi Khaldar-e Sofla
