= Bagh Dai =

Bagh Dai (Persian: باغ دايي) may refer to:

- Bagh Dai-ye Olya
- Bagh Dai-ye Sofla
