= Sar Margh =

Sar Margh (Persian: سرمرغ) may refer to:

- Sar Margh-e Olya
- Sar Margh-e Sofla
