= List of World Heritage Sites in Iran =

UNESCO designated heritage sites and nominated sites in Iran

Location of World Heritage Sites within Iran. Red dots represent cultural sites, the green dots is a natural site. Purple dots represent the sites of Armenian Monastic Ensembles. Orange dots sites of represent the Hyrcanian forests. Blue dots represent sites of the Persian Qanat. Yellow dots represent sites of the Persian Gardens. Black dots represent the sites of The Persian Caravanserai. The half-red, half-black dots represent sites of Bazaar of Tabriz. The half-blue, half-black dots represent sites of Susa. The half-purple, half-black dots represent sites of Soltaniyeh. The half-green, half-black dots represent sites of Sassanid Archaeological Landscape of Fars Region. The half-yellow, half-black dots represent sites of Prehistoric Sites of the Khorramabad Valley. The half-green, half-blue dots represent sites of Historic City of Yazd. The half-orange, half-blue dots represent sites of the Cultural Landscape of Hawraman/Uramanat.

The United Nations Educational, Scientific and Cultural Organization (UNESCO) World Heritage Sites are places of importance to cultural or natural heritage as described in the UNESCO World Heritage Convention, established in 1972. Cultural heritage consists of monuments (such as architectural works, monumental sculptures, or inscriptions), groups of buildings, and sites (including archaeological sites). Natural features (consisting of physical and biological formations), geological and physiographical formations (including habitats of threatened species of animals and plants), and natural sites which are important from the point of view of science, conservation or natural beauty, are defined as natural heritage. Iran accepted the convention on 26 February 1975, making its historical sites eligible for inclusion on the list. As of July 2026, Iran has 30 World Heritage Sites.

The first three sites in Iran, Meidan Naghshe Jahan, Isfahan, Persepolis and Tchogha Zanbil, were inscribed on the list at the Third Session of the World Heritage Committee, held in Cairo and Luxor, Egypt in 1979. They remained the Islamic Republic's only listed properties until 2003, when Takht-e Soleyman was added to the list. The latest addition was Alamūt Castle and Related Fortifications, inscribed in 2026. In addition to its inscribed sites, Iran also has 57 sites on its tentative list as of July 2026.

== World Heritage Sites ==
UNESCO lists sites under ten criteria; each entry must meet at least one of the criteria. Criteria i through vi are cultural, and vii through x are natural.

* Transnational site

World Heritage Sites
#	Site	Image	Location (province)	Dossier (ID number); UNESCO criteria	Year listed (UNESCO designation)	Description
1	Armenian Monastic Ensembles of Iran		West Azerbaijan and East Azerbaijan Provinces	1262; ii, iii, vi (cultural)	2008	Located in Iran's northwest, comprising three groups of Armenian monasteries built between the 7th and 16th centuries. Considered a prime representation of Armenian culture in the region and its interaction with Iranian civilisations.
2	Bam and its Cultural Landscape		Kerman Province	1208bis; ii, iii, iv, v (cultural)	2004	Dates back to the Achaemenid era (6th–4th centuries BCE). Between the 7th and 11th centuries CE, it was at the intersection of significant trade routes for silk and cotton. The city's well-being depended on qanats, ancient underground irrigation systems, with Bam showing some of Iran's earliest examples. Arg-e Bam is a well-preserved fortified medieval town, constructed with traditional mud layer techniques (chineh).
3	Bisotun		Kermanshah Province	1222; ii, iii (cultural)	2006	Holds artifacts from various historic periods, including the Median and Achaemenid empires. The site contains a bas-relief and cuneiform of Darius I from 521 BCE, depicting his rise to power and sovereignty. This scene is accompanied by inscriptions in three languages narrating Darius's conquests and the re-constituting of the Persian Empire.
4	Cultural Landscape of Maymand		Kerman Province	1423rev; v (cultural)	2015	Hosts a self-sustaining, semi-nomadic agro-pastoralist community. Residents practice seasonal migration, utilising mountain pastures and temporary settlements during spring and autumn, while residing in unique cave dwellings carved out of soft rock (kamar) during winter.
5	Cultural Landscape of Hawraman/Uramanat		Kurdistan Province	1647; iii, v (cultural)	2021	Includes two main valleys with tiered architecture and agropastoral practices suited to the steep terrain. The persistent presence of the Hawrami people, a Kurdish tribe, since 3000 BCE is marked by archaeological sites and the dynamic adaptation of their semi-nomadic lifestyle, moving between elevations seasonally. The region has twelve villages.
6	Gonbad-e Qābus		Golestan Province	1398; i, ii, iii, iv (cultural)	2012	The tomb of Qābus Ibn Voshmgir was built in 1006 CE, in northeast Iran. This 53-metre-high tower, highlighting Islamic architectural ingenuity, is all that remains of Jorjan, an ancient hub of knowledge destroyed in the Mongol invasions in the 14th and 15th centuries.
7	Golestan Palace		Tehran Province	1422; ii, iii, iv (cultural)	2013	The Golestan Palace was built during the Qajar era. As one of Tehran's oldest building complexes, it became the Qajar dynasty's centre of power after they took the throne in 1779 and declared Tehran the national capital. Encircling a garden with pools and green spaces, the Palace's distinctive decorations and architectural elements are largely from the 19th century. Its architectural style blends classic Persian elements with 18th century architectural methods and technologies.
8	Lut Desert		Kerman and Sistan and Baluchestan Provinces	1505; vii, viii (natural)	2016	The Lut Desert, also known as Dasht-e-Lut, situated in southeastern Iran, has one of the most extreme climates on Earth, with some of the hottest temperatures and lowest levels of precipitation. Conditions are particularly intense between June and October, when powerful winds cause staggering aeolian erosion. The desert contains yardangs, large wind-sculpted ridges as well as an expanse of rocky plateaus and vast fields of dunes.
9	Sassanid Archaeological Landscape in Fars province (Bishabpur, Firouzabad, Sarvestan)		Fars Province	1568; ii, iii, v (cultural)	2018	In the southeast of Fars Province, Iran, eight archaeological sites are clustered across three zones: Firuzabad, Bishapur and Sarvestan. These areas exhibit an array of well-preserved urban designs, fortified buildings and palaces that trace back to both the beginning and end of the Sasanian Empire, which lasted from 224 to 658 CE. Among these sites are those founded by Ardashir Papakan, the empire's inaugural ruler, including his capital and various constructions by his heir, Shapur I. They exhibit influence from Roman culture.
10	Masjed-e Jāmé of Isfahan		Isfahan, Isfahan Province	1397; ii (cultural)	2012	The Masjed-e Jāmé of Isfahan, a Friday mosque, dates back to 841 CE. It is Iran's oldest preserved mosque . The expansive complex covers more than 20,000 m², notably first incorporated the Sassanid four-courtyard scheme into Islamic sacred structures. The mosque's double-shelled ribbed domes are considered innovation and have significantly influenced regional architecture. Additionally, the edifice includes an array of ornate details that chart the evolution of Islamic art over more than a millennium.
11	Naqsh-e Jahan Square (Meidan Emam, Esfahan)		Isfahan, Isfahan Province	115; i, v, vi (cultural)	1979	Established in the 17th century by Shah Abbas I, this site encapsulates Safavid Persian architecture and urbanism, surrounded by an integrated complex of stately buildings and two-level arcades. Notable structures include the Royal Mosque with its intricate Islamic motifs and the Mosque of Sheykh Lotfollah known for its ornate decoration. The Qaysariyyeh Portico leads to the entrance to the main bazaar, highlighting the site's economic significance. Additionally, the Timurid palace within the complex sheds light on architectural traditions before the Safavid era.
12	Pasargadae		Fars Province	1106; i, ii, iii, iv (cultural)	2004	Pasargadae served as the initial dynastic capital of the Achaemenid Empire, founded by Cyrus II the Great, in the 6th century BCE. Its gardens, palaces and mausoleum are considered prime examples of royal Achaemenid art. The site is considered one of the earliest manifestations of Persian art and architecture.
13	Persepolis		Fars Province	114; i, iii, vi (cultural)	1979	Persepolis, the capital of the Achaemenid Empire, was conceived by Darius I in 518 BCE. This city was constructed atop a grand terrace that blends human creativity with natural topography. The terrace served as the foundation for an elaborate palace complex, where the "king of kings" erected grandiose structures influenced by Mesopotamian architecture.
14	Shahr-e Sukhteh		Sistan and Baluchestan Province	1456; ii, iii, iv (cultural)	2014	Shahr-i Sokhta, (the "Burnt City"), stands at the crossroads of ancient Bronze Age trade routes on the Iranian plateau, bearing witness to the dawn of complex societies in eastern Iran. Established circa 3200 BCE, it was inhabited over four principal periods extending to 1800 BCE. Within its confines, the city evolved to host an array of specialised zones including monumental structures, residential neighborhoods, burial sites and industrial areas. The migration of water resources and shifts in climate precipitated the city's decline, leading to its desertion in the early second millennium BCE. Today, the remaining mudbrick architecture, the extensive necropolis, and the surplus of significant artefacts that have been discovered offer a deep well of knowledge. The arid desert air has preserved these findings, providing ample data about early societal structures as well as the intercommunicating civilisations of the third millennium BCE.
15	Sheikh Safi al-din Khānegāh and Shrine Ensemble in Ardabil		Ardabil Province	1345; i, ii, iv (cultural)	2010	This spiritual retreat, established between the early 16th and late 18th centuries, embodies the Sufi spiritual tradition and showcases the utilisation of traditional Iranian architecture to optimise space for a multi-functional complex. The retreat includes a library, mosque, school, mausolea, cistern, hospital, kitchens, bakery and administrative offices. The path leading to the shrine of the 13th and 14th century Sufi mystic Sheikh Safi al-din Khānegāh is segmented into seven parts, reflecting the seven stages of Sufi spiritual journey, and is punctuated by eight gates representing the eight Sufi attitudes. The entire complex features well-maintained facades and interiors that are ornately decorated, housing a broad collection of historic artefacts. As a whole, the site offers a unique and intact glimpse into the elements of medieval Islamic architecture, specifically tailored to the spiritual and practical needs of a Sufi sanctuary.
16	Shushtar Historical Hydraulic System		Khuzestan Province	1315; i, ii, v (cultural)	2009	Shushtar's Historical Hydraulic System has origins stretching back to the reign of Darius the Great in the 5th century BCE. This complex infrastructure includes diversion canals from the Kârun River, notably the Gargar canal (which is still in use), delivering water to Shushtar through a network of tunnels that harness the energy from watermills. These ancient waterworks create a cascade over cliffs, flowing into a collecting basin and then onto the southward plain, irrigating the land to sustain orchards and farming across approximately 40,000 hectares. This area was referred to as Mianâb or "Paradise". The system encompasses a series of archaeological wonders, like the Salâsel Castel, which served as the control centre for the hydraulics, a tower for monitoring water levels, various dams, bridges, basins and mills.
17	Soltaniyeh		Zanjan Province	1188; ii, iii, iv (cultural)	2005	The mausoleum of Oljaytu, erected from 1302 to 1312 in Soltaniyeh, the then capital of the Ilkhanid dynasty established by the Mongols, is situated in the Zanjan province of Iran. Renowned for epitomising the grandeur of Persian architecture and significantly contributing to the evolution of Islamic architecture, the structure's octagonal design is topped by a 50-metre-high dome adorned with turquoise-blue faience and encircled by eight svelte minarets. It represents the earliest known example of a double-shelled dome in Iran. The interior decorations of the mausoleum are considered elaborate, leading renowned architectural historians like Arthur Upham Pope to see it as a precursor to the architectural magnificence of the Taj Mahal.
18	Susa		Khuzestan Province	1455; i, ii, iii, iv (cultural)	2015	In the southwest of Iran, within the lower Zagros Mountains, lies a site featuring a cluster of archaeological mounds alongside the Shavur River, and across the river is Ardeshir's palace. Susa, the area in question, reveals a chronological stack of urban settlements stretching back from the late 5th millennium BCE to the 13th century CE. This site stands out as a testimony to the (mostly vanished) cultural traditions of the Elamites, Persians and Parthians, exhibiting a diverse range of administrative, residential, and palatial ruins that testify to these civilisations' complex histories.
19	Tabriz Historic Bazaar Complex		East Azerbaijan Province	1346; ii, iii, iv (cultural)	2010	The historic bazaar complex of Tabriz, a hub of cultural exchange since ancient times, stands as a prime commercial centre from the times of the Silk Road. Comprising interconnected, covered brick structures for various uses, the bazaar flourished as early as the 13th century. At that time, Tabriz, located in the Eastern Azerbaijan province, rose to prominence as the capital of the Safavid empire. Though it lost its capital status in the 16th century, Tabriz retained its significance as a mercantile nexus until the late 18th century, despite Ottoman expansion. Today, the bazaar is one of the most comprehensive living examples of Iran's traditional market and cultural milieu.
20	Takht-e Soleyman		West Azerbaijan Province	1077; i, ii, iii, iv, vi (cultural)	2003	The Takht-e Soleyman archaeological site in northwest Iran is located in a valley within a volcanic mountain region. The site features a principal Zoroastrian sanctuary reconstructed during the Ilkhanid (Mongol) period in the 13th century, alongside a Sasanian era (6th and 7th centuries) temple dedicated to the deity Anahita. This site is not only a testament to ancient spirituality but also impacted the evolution of Islamic architectural design through the layout and structures of the fire temple and palace.
21	Tchogha Zanbil		Khuzestan Province	113; iii, iv (cultural)	1979	Tchogha Zanbil, the sacred city of the ancient Elamite Kingdom, is enveloped by three massive concentric walls. Established around 1250 BCE, it was never fully completed due to an invasion by the Assyrian king Ashurbanipal, demonstrated by many abandoned bricks at the site.
22	The Persian Garden		Fars, Kerman, Razavi Khorasan, Yazd, Mazandaran, and Isfahan Provinces	1372; i, ii, iii, iv, vi (cultural)	2011	The property encompasses nine gardens across various provinces, showcasing the diversity of Persian garden designs rooted in principles dating back to the 6th century BCE during the time of Cyrus the Great. Consistently divided into four sectors, these gardens use water for irrigation and ornamentation, symbolising the Biblical Garden of Eden and the Zoroastrian elements of sky, earth, water and plants. Dating back to different periods, these gardens include buildings, pavilions, walls and advanced irrigation systems. Their influence extends to the art of garden design in regions as distant as India and Spain.
23	Trans-Iranian Railway		Mazandaran, Tehran and Khuzestan Provinces	1585: ii, iv (cultural)	2021	The Trans-Iranian Railway, spanning 1,394 km, links the Caspian Sea to the Persian Gulf, traversing diverse terrains, including mountains, rivers, highlands, forests and plains, across four climatic zones. Built between 1927 and 1938, through collaboration between the Iranian monarchical government of Reza Shah Pahlavi and 43 international contractors, the railway stands out for its engineering feats. Overcoming steep routes, it involved extensive mountain cutting, the construction of 174 large bridges, 186 small bridges and 224 tunnels, including 11 spiral tunnels. The project was funded through national taxation to maintain independence from foreign investment and control.
24	Persian Qanat		Razavi Khorasan, South Khorasan, Yazd, Kerman, Markazi and Isfahan Provinces	1506; iii, iv (cultural)	2016	Iran's arid regions rely on the ancient qanat system, tapping alluvial aquifers at valley heads and directing water through gravity-fed underground tunnels to sustain agricultural fields and settlements. Eleven representative qanats, featuring rest areas, water reservoirs and watermills, highlight a communal management system ensuring equitable and sustainable water sharing. This system stands as a testament to cultural traditions and civilizations adapting to arid desert climates.
25	Historic City of Yazd		Yazd, Yazd Province	1544; iii, iv (cultural)	2017	Yazd, centrally located on the Iranian plateau, exemplifies desert survival with its qanat water supply system. Preserving ancient earthen architecture, the city retains traditional districts, markets, religious sites and the historic Dolat-abad garden.
26	Hyrcanian Forests		Golestan, Mazandaran, and Gilan Provinces	1584bis; ix (natural)	2019	Hyrcanian forests once covered broad swaths three provinces bordering Iran's Caspian Sea coast, including Golestan, stretching for 1,000 km. The entirety of the property totals about 7% of Iran's remaining Hyracanian forests.
27	The Persian Caravanserai		(various)	1668; ii, iii (cultural)	2023	Roadside inns known as caravanserais offered pilgrims, caravans and other travelers food, water and shelter. Geographical factors, the presence of water and security concerns all influenced the caravanserais' routes and sites. The property's 54 caravanserais represent a mere fraction of the many caravanserais constructed along Iran's historical roads.
28	Hegmataneh		Hamadan Province	1716; ii, iii (cultural)	2024	Originally the capital of the Median Empire from the 7th century BCE, this ancient city eventually functioned as the summer capital of the Parthian and Persian empires. The unique circular design of this ancient site is one of its defining features. Relics from archeological excavations, such as gold and silver plates reveal the city's historic wealth and importance. Classical historical books make reference to the Median's capital city Ecbatana, which was known for its splendor and its gold and silver-adorned buildings. It served as a hub for several dynasties across different historical eras.
29	The Prehistoric Sites of the Khorramabad Valley		Lorestan Province	1744; iii (cultural)	2025	Khorramabad, the provincial capital located within the valley, is home to numerous archaeological sites and ancient relics. The Khorramabad Valley serves as a crucial area for the study of Iran's ancient civilisations. This site consists of six caves and rock shelters (Kaldar Cave pictured).
30	Alamūt Castle and Related Fortifications	A ruined castle surrounded by snowy mountains	Qazvin Province	1770; iii (cultural)	2026	The castle of the 10th century Ismai'ili Muslim leader Hassan Sabah is located on the northeastern side of Gazor Khan Village near Mo'alem Kalayeh in Roudbar of Alamout historical fortress perched atop a 220-metre cliff, sitting 2,163 metres above sea level on the southwestern slope of Mount Houdkan, part of the larger Alborz Mountains. The remaining structures, including walls, towers, and observation posts, are constructed from stone bonded with gypsum. Covering an area of 10,000 m² the castle's buildings are strategically distributed across varying elevations of the rugged terrain, making efficient use of the topography. The 13th-century historian Ata Malak Joveyni likened the cliff's features to a sleeping camel, while the British explorer Freya Stark described its summit as resembling the prow of a ship pointing northwest. The site also includes six more related castles: Lambesar, Navizaršāh, Šams Kelāyeh, Qosṭinlār, Širkūh, and Ilān.

== Tentative list ==
In addition to sites inscribed on the World Heritage list, member states can maintain a list of tentative sites that they may consider for nomination. Nominations for the World Heritage list are only accepted if the site was previously listed on the tentative list. As of July 2026, Iran has 57 properties on UNESCO's tentative list.

Tentative sites
#	Site	Image	Location (province)	Reference No.; UNESCO criteria	Year submitted	Description
1	Alisadr Cave		Hamadan Province	5220; vii, viii, ix (natural)	2007	The cave is known for its vast water halls and an extraordinary array of speleothems like stalactites and stalagmites, along with various karst formation. Alisadr is the largest water cave accessible by boat, with about 2,400 metres of navigable waters. It is carefully overseen by a sustainable management system to ensure its conversation.
2	Arasbaran Protected Area		Azerbaijan Province	5217; vii, viii, ix, x (natural)	2007	The Arasbaran Protected Area in Iran spans 78,560 hectares with a 134 km perimeter. Its elevation ranges from approximately 256 m to 2,896 m, creating a diverse habitat with a large range of biodiversity encompassing around 1,000 plant and animal taxa. Significant for its rare species, including the Caucasian grouse (Lyurus mlokosiewiczi), the area was designated a conservation zone in 1971 and recognised by UNESCO as a wildlife refuge since 1976, becoming Iran's ninth Biosphere Reserve.
3	Asbads (windmill) of Iran		Razavi Khorasan, Sistan and Baluchestan	6192; i, ii, iv, v (cultural)	2017	Eastern Iran witnesses strong northern winds (Shamal), far more than other locations in the country. Thus these wind systems are nicknamed "120 days winds", affecting areas such as Sistan and Baluchistan, Southern Khorasan, and parts of Razavi Khorasan Provinces, with speeds of up to 100 kph. This unique climate of intense winds and water scarcity influenced the local population's development of windmills called "Asbad" to harness wind energy for grinding grains. These windmills, significant to Iranian desert architecture, are strategically built on high elevations to efficiently capture wind without obstruction. Concentrated in regions with persistent winds, they also grind grains and moreover act as barriers for nearby settlements against storms. The use of mechanical energy dates back 3,000 years in Iran and China, with the Iranian vertical-axis windmills spreading across the Islamic world and eventually influencing European windmill design in areas such Portugal and the Aegean Sea.
4	Bastam and Kharghan		Semnan Province	5198; ii, iii, iv (cultural)	2007	The assemblage includes Sheikh Bayazid Bastami's complex, the Chief Mosque, Kashaneh's towered dome, and part of the old city wall. Centred around the grave of Sheikh Bayazid Bastami, a renowned Sufi, the complex has attracted significant constructions since the 19th century. The oldest structures within the complex date to the 8th and 9th centuries AD.
5	Bazaar of Qaisariye in Laar		Laar, Fars province	5196; i, ii, iii, vi (cultural)	2007	Laar exemplifies urban planning from the pre-Safavid era, with its design showcasing resilience and adaptation after a major earthquake in 1960. The continuity and development of the Bazaar of Qaisariye, alongside the construction of a square featuring a polo gate and encircling porticos, illustrate a distinctive urban complex emerging from the post-disaster reconstruction efforts .
6	Damavand		Mazandaran province	5278; vii, viii, ix, x (natural)	2008	Mount Damavand, standing at approximately 5,628 metres above sea level, is Iran's highest peak and an inactive volcano that saw activity during the Quaternary period. The mountain is known for its numerous thermal springs, like Ask and Larijan, as well as for being perpetually snow-capped throughout the year. The region's biodiversity encompasses around 2,000 plant species, including a variety of endemic species that are of great significance to the global flora.
7	Firuzabad Ensemble		Firuzabad, Fars	893;(cultural)	1997	The Firuzabad ensemble, within a 12 km zone, encapsulates the rich history of the Sasanian period through pivotal structures such as the circular City of Gur, the nearby Palace of Ardashir by the Tangab river, and the strategically placed Qal'eh Dokhtar fortress. It also hosts significant art in the form of bas reliefs depicting that era's notable events and the Pahlavi inscription of Mehr-Nerse. These elements collectively highlight the Sasanian empire's urban planning and architectural styles.
8	Ghaznavi- Seljukian Axis in Khorasan		Khorasan Province	5211; i, ii, iii, iv (cultural)	2007	Numerous caravanserais along the Silk Route, dating back to the Seljuk period, such as Robat-Sharaf and Robat-Mahi, along with historical complexes like Sang-bast and constructions like the Baba Loghman Building, underscore the importance of this trade artery historically and in contemporary times for the Khorasan region.
9	Hamoun Lake		Sistan and Baluchistan Province	5276; vii, viii, ix, x (natural)	2008	This eastern desert lake is divided into three zones: Hamoun-Hirmand to the south and southwest, Hamoun-e-Sabereen to the northwest, and Hamoun-e-Pouzak to the northeast of the Sistan Plain. During high-precipitation seasons, the lake's surface area is approximately 5,700 km^{2}, of which 3,800 km^{2} lies within Iran and the remainder in Afghanistan.
10	Harra Protected Area		Hormozgan Province	5277; vii, viii, ix, x (natural)	2008	The Khuran Strait reserve lies between Qeshm Island and the southern Iranian mainland, featuring the Mehran delta with its extensive intertidal flats and the region's largest stand of Harra mangroves (Avicennia marina). The mangroves provide essential resources for various bird species in the region, in light of the area's subtropical climate the features very hot summers and sparse rainfall. Protectively marked in 1972 and recognised as a Ramsar Site and biosphere reserve by 1976, the area spans over 82,360 hectares of mangroves and mudflats.
11	Historic ensemble of Qasr-e ²		Qasr-e Shrin, Kermanshah Province	889; ii, vi (cultural)	1997 (renominated in 2007 under Reference No. 5188)	Qasr-e Shirin is an archaeological site that dates back to the Sasanian era and even earlier. The site includes ruins of palaces, temples and other structures, reflecting the area's importance as a cultural and political centre for several centuries. Qasr-e Shirin is particularly noted for its historical significance in relation to the Persian epic poem of Khosrow and Shirin, a tragic romance story that has been a key subject in Persian literature and art.
12	Historic Monument of Kangavar		Kangavar, Kermanshah Province	5189; iii (cultural)	2007	An ancient site dedicated to the Persian water goddess, Anahita. The temple complex is characterised by grandiose terraces, monumental stairways and remnants of stone columns, suggesting a blend of Greek and Persian architectural influences.
13	Imam Reza Holy Complex		Mashhad, Razavi Khorasan Province	6194; i, ii, iii, iv, vi (cultural)	2017	This complex is dedicated to Imam Reza, the eighth of twelve Shia Imams, and attracts millions of pilgrims annually. The shrine includes a mosque, a mausoleum, a library, and several other religious and educational buildings. Its architecture is noted for intricate tile work, domes and minarets, which display the richness of Islamic art and architecture. Over the centuries, the complex has been expanded and beautified by various rulers.
14	Industrial Heritage of textile in the central Plateau of Iran		Isfahan, Yazd and Kerman Provinces	6196; i, ii, iii, iv (cultural)	2017	The area's historical narrative is marked by the presence of various mills and workshops, where artisans and workers employed a blend of age-old practices and emerging technologies developed during the Industrial Revolution to produce textiles renowned for their quality and distinctive designs. This site underscores the region's role in not only advancing textile production but also in transforming the social and economic landscape.
15	Jiroft		Kerman Province	5210; ii, iii, v, vi (cultural)	2007	Known for its collection of artifacts, including intricately designed chlorite vessels, Jiroft is seen as a central site for understanding early urban development and trade networks in the region. The discovery of these artifacts suggests that the area was a major centre for craftsmanship and commerce, possibly linked to ancient Mesopotamia and the Indus Valley. The site's extensive ruins and artifacts offer invaluable insights into the cultural and economic complexities of an ancient society in Iran.
16	Blue Mosque, Tabriz (Kaboud Mosque)		Tabriz, East Azerbaijan Province	5202; i, ii, iii, iv (cultural)	2007	An historic mosque renowned for its exquisite blue tilework, which gives the mosque its name. Constructed in 1465 under the order of Jahan Shah, the ruler of the Qara Qoyunlu dynasty, the mosque was severely damaged by an earthquake in 1779 but has since undergone restoration efforts to preserve its architectural beauty. The mosque's design features a blend of Islamic and Persian architectural elements, with intricate calligraphy and patterns adorning its interior and exterior. Despite the earthquake's damage, the Blue Mosque remains a symbol of Tabriz's rich cultural and religious history.
17	Kerman Historical-Cultural Structure		Kerman Province	5271; i, ii, iii, iv, vi (cultural)	2008	This structure encompasses a variety of significant buildings, including mosques, bazaars, caravanserais and bathhouses, each reflecting the diverse historical periods of the region. The city's layout, characterised by its traditional bazaars, narrow alleys and public squares, exemplifies classical Persian urban planning. Kerman's historical core is notable for its intricate tile work, mud-brick construction and decorative elements that are said to embody the aesthetic and technological advancements of its time.
18	Khabr National Park and Ruchun Wildlife Refuge		Kerman Province	5219; vii, viii, ix, x (natural)	2007	This protected nature reserve encompasses 169,200 hectares and features more than 750 species of flora, 120 of which are endemic. Its topography is characterised by mountainous landscapes (with the highest elevation 3,845 m above sea level) and dense vegetation, providing critical habitat for endangered species and a wide range of wildlife, including Persian leopards, Asiatic black bears, and various bird species. The park and refuge are also important for their ecological functions, such as watershed protection and climate regulation.
19	Mount Khajeh (Kuh-e Khuaja)		Zabol, Sistan and Baluchistan Provinces	5184; ii, iii, iv (cultural)	2007	The mountain is a flat-topped black basalt hill that rises from the surrounding Hamoun Lake. This site is notable for its archaeological significance, featuring the ruins of an ancient citadel and several pre-Islamic and Islamic historical structures, including Zoroastrian fire temples and a Sasanian-era palace. The mountain's unique geography serves as a natural fortress. It has also been a significant cultural and religious centre over the centuries.
20	Naqsh-e Rostam and Naqsh-e Rajab		Marvdasht, Fars Province	898;(cultural)	1997	Naqsh-e Rostam is an ancient necropolis, housing the rock-cut tombs of four Achaemenid kings, including Darius the Great, and features bas-reliefs from both the Achaemenid and Sasanian periods that depict royal victories and ceremonies. These sites provide critical insights into the ceremonial and funerary practices of ancient Persian empires, showcasing the artistic output in the Achaemenid and Sasanian periods. The preservation of these reliefs and tombs offers valuable information on the political and religious ideologies of the time.
21	Natural-Historical Complex / Cave of Karaftoo		Kurdistan Province	6193; ii, iii, iv, v, vii, x (mixed)	2017	A natural-historical complex known for unique geological formations and historical significance. Consisting of various chambers and passages, the cave system has been utilised by humans for millennia, serving as a place of habitat, worship and a defensive refuge. The cave's Greek inscriptions suggest it was once dedicated to the Greek god Hermes. The complex also features man-made rooms and corridors that indicate its use during different historical periods, including the Islamic era.
22	Persepolis and other relevant buildings		Fars Province	5186; ii, iv, vi (cultural)	2007	An ancient archaeological site, once the ceremonial capital of the Achaemenid Empire under Cyrus the Great and his successors. The complex includes palaces, halls and a treasury. Notable structures within the site include the Gate of All Nations include the Apadana Palace, and the Tomb of Artaxerxes III.
23	Persian Mosque		(various)	6877; i, ii, iii, iv, vi (cultural)	2024	This serial nomination consists of 17 historic mosques located in various localities and provinces across Iran. The mosques were selected for their incorporation of traditional Persian architectural symmetry and geometric patterns. One notable building included in the list is the Agha Bozorg Mosque in Kashan.
24	Qeshm Island		Hormozgan Province	5215; vii, viii, ix, x (natural)	2007	The largest island in the Persian Gulf, Qeshm features a variety of renowned landscapes, including the Hara Marine Forests, the Valley of Stars with its distinctive rock formations, and the Kharbas Caves, which have historical and archaeological significance. Qeshm is also home to a diverse range of wildlife, including migratory birds, sea turtles and dolphins. The island's economy is primarily based on fishing, boat building and tourism, with an increasing interest in eco-tourism Qeshm's cultural heritage is reflected in its traditional music, clothing and crafts, presenting what many consider to be a vibrant scene that blends traditions with modernity.
25	Sabalan		Ardabil Province	5218; vii, viii, ix (natural)	2007	A dormant volcanic mountain at an altitude of 4,820 m, Sabalan is Iran's third-highest peak. The mountain is known for its hot springs, attracting tourists seeking health benefits. Sabalan historically held a central role in local mythology, having been considered a sacred mountain in Persian folklore. Its slopes are used by pastoralists and are home to nomadic tribes during the summer months. The mountain's diverse ecosystems support a variety of plant and animal life.
26	Salt Domes of Iran		Fars Province, Bushehr, Hormozgan, Qom and Zanjan	6198; vii, viii (natural)	2017	The salt domes were created by the upward movement of salt from deep within the earth, pushing through overlying layers of rock to form impressive structures on the surface. Iran's salt domes are noted for frequent vivid colours, which are the result of their mineral content. They contribute to the area's biodiversity through creating unique ecological niches. Additionally, they are of considerable economic importance, as some domes contain valuable deposits of rock salt, gypsum, and other minerals.
27	Shush		100 km south of Ahvaz, Khuzestan Province	894; (cultural)	1997	An ancient city and one of the oldest known settlements in the world, with archaeological evidence dating back to as early as 4000 BCE. Susa was an important city in various ancient empires, including the Elamite, Persian and Parthian empires, serving as a political and economic centre. The site includes significant historical ruins, such as the palace of Darius the Great, the Apadana, and the Susa acropolis.
28	Silk Route (also as Silk Road)		Khorasan Province	5268; i (cultural)	2008	The Silk Route in Iran refers to the sections of the ancient Silk Road that passed through the Iranian plateau, connecting Europe and Asia for centuries. This network of trade routes facilitated the exchange of silk, spices, textiles and precious goods, as well as ideas, cultures, and technologies between civilisations. Iran's strategic location rendered it a vital corridor within the Silk Road, with cities such as Nishapur, Rey, and Isfahan becoming bustling centres of commerce and intellectual exchange. The routes contributed to these cities' prosperity, making them focal points for cultural and economic development.
29	Tape Sialk		Isfahan Province	900;(cultural)	1997	An archaeological site dating back to the 5th millennium BCE that comprises two main mounds ("tepes"), which have revealed multiple layers of civilisation through extensive archaeological excavations. The site is considered a key historical source for understanding the early development of agricultural societies in Iran's central plateau. Tepe Sialk has yielded important artifacts, including pottery, tools, and architectural remains, that illustrate the social, economic and technological advancements of its inhabitants. The discovery of a ziggurat-like structure on the site indicates the existence of religious or administrative activities.
30	Taq-e Bostan		Kermanshah, Kermanshah Province	5182; i, ii, iii, iv (cultural)	2007	An archaeological site encompassing a range of artifacts, including the ancient Morad-Hassel Tepe, a historic village, a Parthian burial site and a hunting ground from the Sassanid era. The centrepiece of this complex is the Sassanid section, featuring two porticoes (known as the large and small Ivans) and remarkable bas-reliefs from the same epoch.
31	The Collection of Historical Bridges		Lorestan Province	5273; i, ii, iii (cultural)	2008	Iran's numerous rivers are crisscrossed by a number of ancient bridges like the Pol-e Dokhtar, Gavmishan and Kashkan, which have strengthened security, economic and cultural connections between various regions within the country. Bridge building peaked during the Sasanian period, exhibiting characteristics like enormous piers, lofty arches and engraved stones. As a testament to the engineering and architectural accomplishments of that historical era, Lorestan's collection of sixty medieval bridges is regarded as one of the oldest and largest in the world.
32	The Complex of Izadkhast		Fars province	5205; i, ii, iii, iv (cultural)	2007	A fortress, a caravanserai, and a bridge, situated within an ancient cultural landscape. The complex is strategically positioned along ancient trade routes, serving as a vital hub for commerce, military, and communication purposes. The fortress, perched on a natural rock formation, offers insights into defensive architecture, while the caravanserai provided lodging for travelers and traders. The nearby bridge facilitated the movement of goods and people across the region.
33	The Cultural-Natural Landscape of Ramsar		City of Ramsar, province of Mazandaran	5201; iii, iv, vii, x (mixed)	2007	The city of Ramsar and its surrounding spanning the northern foothills of Alborz Mountains to the shores of Caspian Sea. The cultural-architectural landscape of the area includes an historic hotel, a 30-acre garden, a palace from the Pahlavi dynasty and the main boulevard concludes at the (former) Ramsar Casino. The city's urban planning was considered a prime example of optimal integration with its natural landscape.
34	The Great Wall of Gorgan		Golestan Province	6199; i, ii, iii, iv, v (cultural)	2017	Constructed during the Sasanian Empire in the 5th or 6th century BCE, this defensive barrier stretches approximately 195 km, making it one of the longest fortification systems of ancient times. The wall was built to protect the empire's northeastern borders against nomadic invasions and is accompanied by a series of forts, watchtowers and water reservoirs, showcasing advanced engineering and military architecture relative to this historical period. The wall's construction utilised fired bricks, a testament to the technological capabilities of the Sasanians.
35	The Historical City of Masouleh		City of Masouleh, Gilan province	5204; ii, iii, iv, v (cultural)	2007	Founded in 1006 CE, Masouleh's layout is adapted to its location on the steep slopes of the Alborz mountains, featuring houses built in a stair-step configuration. This unique design ensures that the roofs of houses on one level serve as the courtyards for houses on the level above, maximising space and complementing the natural terrain. The city's buildings, made from local materials like mud-brick, wood and stone, are considered well-blended with the landscape. Today Masuleh has maintained its traditional social and economic structures, making it a living example of rural life in Iran.
36	The Historical City of Maybod		Maybod, Yazd Province	5193; i, ii, iii, iv, v (cultural)	2007	An ancient city showcasing a rich tapestry of cultural, architectural and urban developments. The city's urban fabric includes structures such as the Naryn Castle, one of the oldest and largest mud-brick fortresses in Iran.
37	The Historical Port of Siraf		Province of Bushehr	5195; v (cultural)	2007	Siraf was a point along the maritime Silk Route, facilitating trade between the Middle East, India, and the Far East. Archaeological excavations have unearthed remnants of the city's historical relics, including residential areas, mosques and bazaars. Additional findings showcase evidence of extensive trade networks, such as imported ceramics and goods from distant lands. The port's architecture and urban planning reflect a prosperous society adept in maritime trade and capable of adapting to the coastal desert environment. The decline of Siraf in the 12th century CE, likely due to geological and economic factors, marked the end of its era as a trading powerhouse.
38	The Historical Texture of Damghan		Semnan province	5200; ii, iii, iv, v (cultural)	2007	Dates back to the pre-Islamic era as one of Iran's oldest cities. Damghan has played a significant role in various periods, notably during the Parthian and Sasanian empires, and later under Islamic rule. The city's historical fabric comprises an array of ancient structures, including the Tarikhaneh Mosque, one of the oldest mosques in Iran, featuring elements from a Sasanian fire temple, and the ancient city walls that hint at Damghan's historical importance as a fortified city.
39	The Historical Village of Abyaneh		Village of Abyaneh, Isfahan Province	5197; ii, iii, iv (cultural)	2007	The village is known for its distinctive red mud-brick houses that seemingly blend with the rugged mountainous landscape. Abyaneh is also highlighted by its labyrinthine streets, multi-leveled houses and significant historical structures, including Zoroastrian fire temples and Islamic mosques that exhibit unique architectural features.
40	Jame' (Congregational) Mosque of Esfahan		Isfahan Province	888; i, ii, iii, iv, vi (cultural)	1997	The 2-hectacre complex is considered a prime example of Iran's Persian-Islamic architecture. The mosque's structures were built over several successive civilisations between the 8th and 20th centuries. The complex is noted for its integration to urban surroundings and serving as a key pedestrian and commercial hub within Isfahan, a city of 2.5 million and Iran's third-largest. Its present configuration is the sum of building and decorating activities carried out from the 8th through the 20th centuries.
41	The Natural-Historical Landscape of Izeh		Khuzestan province	5269; i, ii, iii, iv, v, vi (cultural)	2008	These areas are notable for their ancient rock paintings that uniquely depict figures in a sequential manner, creating a form of background perspective. Remarkably, this site is recognised for featuring the earliest instances of women and men being depicted together in Iranian art.
42	The Persian House in Central plateau of Iran		Isfahan and Yazd Provinces	6200; ii, iv, v, vi (cultural)	2017	A residential structure adapted to the arid climate and cultural surroundings of the region. Characterised by high walls, central courtyards, wind towers (badgirs) and ornate doors, these houses are designed to maximise natural cooling and ventilation, providing comfortable living conditions in the hot and dry climate. The central courtyard serves as a communal area for family activities, often containing a garden, which brings nature into the home and helps to cool the air. Wind towers, an ingenious element of these homes, capture cooler breezes and direct them into living spaces.
43	The Zandiyeh Ensemble of Fars Province		Shiraz, Fars Province	5270; vi (cultural)	2008	The Ensemble of Karim Khani Buildings stands as the cornerstone of old Shiraz, spanning from the Zandiyeh era to the present day. Its construction across various periods reflects a fusion of urban elements from each era, rendering it of significant historical importance. Consequently, it emerges as a comprehensive exemplar of contemporary Iranian architecture, encapsulating the evolution of architectural styles over time.
44	Touran Biosphere Reserve		Semnan Province	5275; x (natural)	2008	A protected area recognised for its unique biodiversity and desert ecosystem. Spanning an area of approximately 1.5 million hectares, it represents one of the largest reserves in Iran. The reserve is characterised by its arid and semi-arid landscapes, offering a habitat for a wide range of flora and fauna adapted to extreme environmental conditions. It provides a sanctuary for the critically endangered Asiatic cheetah, as well as other species such as Persian onagers, gazelles and the Persian leopard.
45	Tous Cultural Landscape		Tous, Khorasan province	5203; iii, iv, vi (cultural)	2017	The landscape encompasses the remnants of the ancient city of Tus along with its significant historical, literary, and religious sites. Among these, the most notable is the mausoleum of Ferdowsi, the revered Persian poet who authored the Shahnameh, an epic poem foundational to Persian culture and identity.
46	University of Tehran		Tehran Province	6201; ii, vi (cultural)	2017	Tehran University, established in 1934, is Iran's first higher education institution and a model for others in the country. It comprises 25 faculties, 9 campuses, and 11 research centres, created by merging several pre-existing schools and research institutes. The university's architecture is a blend of Persian and European styles, featuring traditional, transitional, and modern stages. Its design, involving prominent Iranian and foreign architects, significantly influenced Tehran's urban planning. The university's central library, housing 700,000 books, exemplifies its role in advancing education and architecture in Iran.
47	Zozan		Khorasan Province	5208; ii, iii, iv (cultural)	2007	Situated 41 km from the ancient city of Khargard, featuring a rectangular layout. On its southern edge, an age-old castle stands prominently, while to the west, the main mosque, dating back to the Khwarazmian era and designed with a dual-balcony structure, marks its presence. The city's distance from modern urban developments has allowed it to preserve its originality and structural integrity exceptionally well. Notable structures in Zozan, such as the Chief Mosque, bear similarities to early Islamic architecture, including the Gonbad Mosque in Bactria or the dual-balconied mosques in Khorasan, alongside other elements like qanats, which can be paralleled with the qanat system in Bam.
48	Vali-e Asr Street		Tehran Province	6387; ii, iii, iv (cultural)	2019	A key north-south street in central Tehran, along which the modern metropolis developed in the late 19th century. The street's buildings have included some emblematic examples of Iran's modernist architecture, geometric street patterns and urban planning schemes. In the present the boulevard serves a focal point for Tehran's everyday bustle, including significant residential, shopping, administrative, medical and religious activities. The street's southern starting point is Rah Ahan Square, adjacent to Tehran's main rail station, whilst its northern terminus is Tajrish Square.
49	Monastery of St. Amenaprkich (New Julfa Vank)		Isfahan Province	6385; ii, iii, vi (cultural)	2019	The monastery of Amenaprkich was constructed in Isfahan's New Julfa neighbourhood, which functions as the city's Armenian quarter, and serves as a testament to Armenian heritage in both the city and the wider eastern Armenian religious-cultural presence in the Iranian plateau. The monastic complex occupies 8,731 m² alongside the city's Meydan-e Bozorg (lit. "Grand Square") and consists of a main cathedral and adjacent courtyard, the belfry, a library, a museum, a clock tower, residential quarters for the bishop and priests, prayer assembly halls and a printing house. The Monastery of St. Amenaprkich architecturally incorporates both classical Armenian Christian and Persian Islamic motifs, including religious paintings and soaring domes, and colorfoul ceramics.
50	Serial Nomination of Tehran's Modern Architectural Heritage	Azadi Tower, Tehran	Tehran Province	6548; ii, iii, iv (cultural)	2021	The Pahlavi dynasty that replaced the Qajaris as rulers of Iran in the early 20th century ushered in an era of modernisation that included an emphasis on European education and cultural imitation. This extended to the architectural realm, where the Pahlavis' top-down bureaucratic centralisation promoted the construction of large structures for public use including schools, universities, factories, national institutional buildings and ministries. A new cadre of local Iranian architects and some foreign expatriates promoted a trend of Modernist architecture in Iran beginning in the 1940s, which incorporated global styles such as Art Deco. Arguably the most iconic Modernist architecture landmarks built was Tehran's Azadi Tower. Later Iranian architecture tended to fuse local traditional styles with newer globally-popular trends to create a distinct contemporary Iranian architecture.
51	Chega Sofla (Ritual Landscape of Chega Sofla)		Khuzestan Province	6549; i, ii, iii, iv, vi (cultural)	2021	An ancient site situation in southern Khuzastan's Beygun plain near the Persian Gulf coast, Chega Sofla features the remains of a settlement and a cemetery. The site is considered the largest prehistoric site from the 5th millennium BCE and contains the world's oldest brick tombs. Data obtained from archeological digs at the site indicates the presence of human activity between 4,700 and 3,700 BCE.
52	Architecture of the historical settlements across the northern coasts of Persian Gulf	Laft port, Qeshm Island, Hormozgan Province	Bushehr, Hormozgan and Sistan, and Baluchestan Provinces	6650; ii, iii, iv, v, vi (cultural)	2021	Iran's port cities in the Persian Gulf, namely Siraf, Kong, Laft, Kish and Mokran, reflects the region's long-standing seafaring heritage. The historic urban architecture and port facilities of these coastal cities, much of which is still intact, are encoded into the region's historiography as symbols of global trade and cross-cultural interaction, including the integration of Indian and East African influences.
53	Cultural Landscape of Kong Historic Port		Hormozgan	6551; i, ii, iii, iv, v, vii (cultural)	2021	The Persian Gulf port town of Kong is known for combining man-made developments with natural geographical advantages. The town's system of water collection (borkeh) and irrigation was considered an innovative solution to account for the area's lack of natural potable water sources, while the structures become emblematic architectural features of the landscape. The port served for several millennia as a key Iranian nexus for Indian Ocean commerce and cultural interaction with India, Southeast Asia and East Africa.
54	Long-lived trees of Iran	Ancient Cypress tree in Abarkuh	(various)	6552; vii, ix (natural)	2021	Iranian authorities have identified more than 2,000 long-lived trees, some of which ages' extend for several thousand years, which possess botanical, cultural and historical significance. The desire to preserve them is part of a global campaign for environmental protection of these fragile trees. The list of such trees, includes the renowned Cypress of Abarkuh in the Yazd Province, whose age is estimated at upwards of 4,000 years.
55	The Historical–Cultural Axis of Fin, Sialk, Kashan	Garden of Fin, Kashan	Isfahan Province Kashan	5187; i, ii, iii, iv, vi (cultural)	2007	The region includes landmarks that represent Iranian history through several epochs, from its earliest known recorded stages through the Islamic era and to the present. The Soleymanieh Spring in Fin is thought to be the region's prototype settlement that generated the Sialk civilization of the 5th Millennium BCE and the most well-known garden in Iranian history in Fin. The surroundings of Kashan are central to the development of Islamic civilisation in Iran.
56	Sheikh Ahmad-e Jām Khaneghah and Mausoleum Complex (Mazar-e Jām)		Razavi Khorasan Province	6553; ii, iii, iv (cultural)	2021	Sheikh Ahmad-e Jami was an 11th and 12th century Sufi poet who generated a following of pilgrims and adherents based on his popular preaching. His followers constructed a shrine following his death in an architectural style that was designed to align with his Sufi spiritual practices and hospitality (in the tradition of Khaneghah lodges)The shrine is considered an architectural gem in eastern Iran, particularly in the incorporation of ornaments. The site has been well maintained over the centuries since Jami's death, including structural renovations. Additionally, newer aesthetically acclaimed structures have been built around the complex by successive Seljuk, Al-Kurt, Timurid, Safavid and Qajar rulers.

== See also ==
- List of Intangible Cultural Heritage elements in Iran
