= Seyl Mish =

Seyl Mish (Persian: سيلميش) may refer to:

- Seyl Mish-e Olya, Robat, Khorramabad, Lorestan, Iran; a village
- Seyl Mish-e Sofla, Robat, Khorramabad, Lorestan, Iran; a village
