= Cheshmeh-ye Cheragh Ali =

Cheshmeh-ye Cheragh Ali چشمه چراغعلي
- Village
- Location within Iran
- Coordinates: 33°39′00″N 48°15′00″E
- Country: Iran
- Province: Lorestan
- County: Khorramabad
- Bakhsh: Central
- Rural District: Robat

Population (2006)
  - Total: 41
- Time zone: UTC+3:30 (IRST)
  - Summer (DST): UTC+4:30 (IRDT)

Cheshmeh-ye Cheragh Ali (Persian: چشمه چراغعلي, also Romanized as Cheshmeh-ye Cherāgh 'Alī) is a village in Robat Rural District, in the Central District of Khorramabad County, Lorestan province, Iran. At the 2006 census, its population was 41, in 8 families.
