= Temple of the Medes =

Temple of the Medes is a temple constructed by Medes located in UNESCO World Heritage Site the ancient site of Bisotun city in Kermanshah province, Iran. this temple discovered by German Archeologists during 1963 till 1967. this historical heritage listed as Iranian national heritages on March 10, 2002.
