= Cham Choqal-e Sofla =

Cham Choqal-e Sofla چم چقال سفلي
- Village
- Location within Iran
- Coordinates: 33°36′54″N 48°17′27″E
- Country: Iran
- Province: Lorestan
- County: Khorramabad
- Bakhsh: Central
- Rural District: Robat

Population (2006)
  - Total: 160
- Time zone: UTC+3:30 (IRST)
  - Summer (DST): UTC+4:30 (IRDT)

Cham Choqal-e Sofla (Persian: چم چقال سفلي, also Romanized as Cham Choqāl-e Soflá; also known as Cham Choghāl-e Soflá) is a village in Robat Rural District, in the Central District of Khorramabad County, Lorestan Province, Iran. At the 2006 census, its population was 160, in 32 families.
