= Royal hunt =

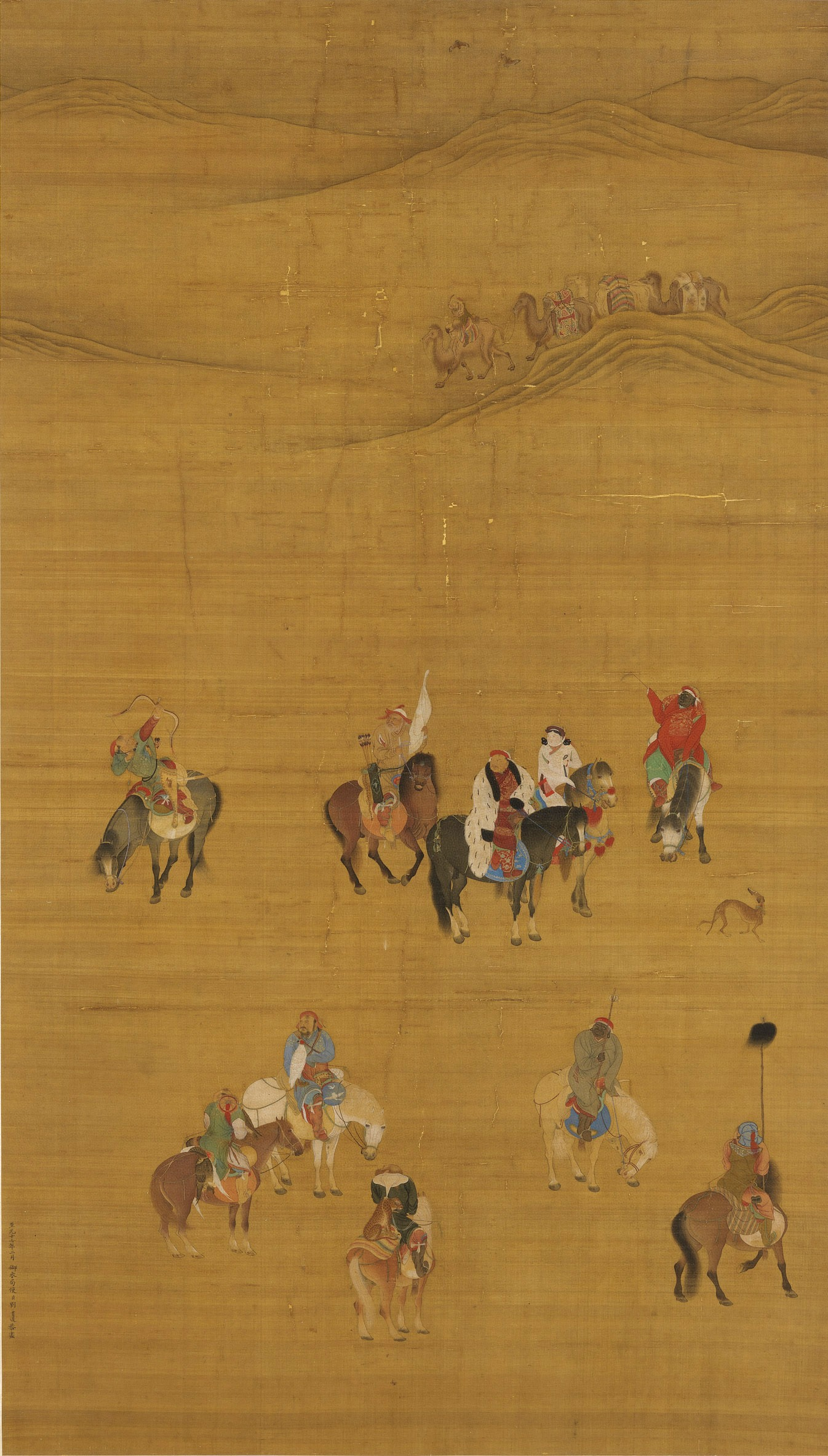
Kublai Khan on the hunt, contemporary painting by Liu Guandao

The royal hunt was an institution found throughout Eurasia and Northern Africa from antiquity until the early 19th century. It can be traced in ancient Egypt about 4000 years ago, but it lasted the longest in Iran, where it survived almost to the end of the Qajar dynasty. Its core area was the Iranian Plateau, North India and Turkestan. Next to the core area were Anatolia, Mesopotamia and Transcaucasia. Even accounts of royal hunts from places as distant as Ethiopia and Qing China are so similar as to be nearly interchangeable.

The popularity of the royal hunt was correlated with the popularity of cavalry over infantry and with the presence of big game. It was inversely correlated with the popularity of hunting for sustenance. The royal hunt was not universal across Eurasia. It is not found, for instance, around the Mediterranean Sea in classical antiquity. Greek and Roman authors looked down on the Persian practice of hunting in enclosed parks. After the fall of Rome, however, the royal hunt gained prominence in Europe. The hunt as a "ritual of royalty" and a "force for [political] consensus" peaked during the reign of Charlemagne in the centuries after the fall of Rome. The royal forest as a hunting preserve dates to the Carolingian era.

== See also ==
- Imperial hunt of the Qing dynasty
- Grand Huntsman of France
- Khosrow Parviz hunting ground
- Lion Hunt of Ashurbanipal
- Medieval hunting

== Sources ==
- Allsen, Thomas T. (2011), The Royal Hunt in Eurasian History, University of Pennsylvania Press, ISBN 9780812201079
- Goldberg, Eric J. (2020), In the Manner of the Franks: Hunting, Kingship, and Masculinity in Early Medieval Europe, University of Pennsylvania Press
- Kallander, George (2023), Human–Animal Relations and the Hunt in Korea and Northeast Asia, Edinburgh University Press
