= Sar Margh-e Sofla =

Sar Margh-e Sofla سرمرغ سفلي
- Village
- Location within Iran
- Coordinates: 33°36′12″N 48°14′30″E
- Country: Iran
- Province: Lorestan
- County: Khorramabad
- Bakhsh: Central
- Rural District: Robat

Population (2006)
  - Total: 34
- Time zone: UTC+3:30 (IRST)
  - Summer (DST): UTC+4:30 (IRDT)

Sar Margh-e Sofla (Persian: سرمرغ سفلي, also Romanized as Sar Margh-e Soflá) is a village in Robat Rural District, in the Central District of Khorramabad County, Lorestan Province, Iran. At the 2006 census, its population was 34, in 6 families.
