= Rimaleh =

Village in Lorestan province, Iran

Rimaleh Persian: ريمله
- Village
- Location within Iran
- Coordinates: 33°38′23″N 48°23′56″E
- Country: Iran
- Province: Lorestan
- County: Khorramabad
- District: Central
- Rural District: Robat

Population (2016)
  - Total: 408
- Time zone: UTC+3:30 (IRST)

Rīmleh (Persian: ريمله) (Note: Also romanized as Rīmaleh and Rīmleh; also known as Rapamleh) is a village in Robat Rural District of the Central District in Khorramabad County, Lorestan province, Iran.

== Demographics ==
=== Population ===
At the time of the 2006 National Census, the village's population was 467 in 104 households. The following census in 2011 counted 385 people in 104 households. The 2016 census measured the population of the village as 408 people in 112 households.
