= Zarrin Choqa-ye Olya =

Zarrin Choqa-ye Olya زرين چقاعليا
- Village
- Location within Iran
- Coordinates: 33°38′52″N 48°15′35″E
- Country: Iran
- Province: Lorestan
- County: Khorramabad
- Bakhsh: Central
- Rural District: Robat

Population (2006)
  - Total: 112
- Time zone: UTC+3:30 (IRST)
  - Summer (DST): UTC+4:30 (IRDT)

Zarrin Choqa-ye Olya (Persian: زرين چقاعليا, also Romanized as Zarrīn Choqā-ye ‘Olyā; also known as Zarrīn Choghā-ye ‘Olyā) is a village in Robat Rural District, in the Central District of Khorramabad County, Lorestan Province, Iran. At the 2006 census, its population was 112, in 19 families.
