= Sar Margh-e Olya =

Sar Margh-e Olya سرمرغ عليا
- Village
- Location within Iran
- Coordinates: 33°36′55″N 48°13′03″E
- Country: Iran
- Province: Lorestan
- County: Khorramabad
- Bakhsh: Central
- Rural District: Robat

Population (2006)
  - Total: 56
- Time zone: UTC+3:30 (IRST)
  - Summer (DST): UTC+4:30 (IRDT)

Sar Margh-e Olya (Persian: سرمرغ عليا, also Romanized as Sar Margh-e ‘Olyā and Sar Morgh-e ‘Olyā; also known as Sar Margh and Sar Morgh) is a village in Robat Rural District, in the Central District of Khorramabad County, Lorestan Province, Iran. At the 2006 census, its population was 56 across 12 families.
