= Seyl Mish-e Olya =

Seyl Mish-e Olya سيلميش عليا
- Village
- Location within Iran
- Coordinates: 33°40′04″N 48°22′39″E
- Country: Iran
- Province: Lorestan
- County: Khorramabad
- Bakhsh: Central
- Rural District: Robat

Population (2006)
  - Total: 12
- Time zone: UTC+3:30 (IRST)
  - Summer (DST): UTC+4:30 (IRDT)

Seyl Mish-e Olya (Persian: سيلميش عليا, also Romanized as Seyl Mīsh-e ‘Olyā; also known as Seyl Mīsh and Sīlmish) is a village in Robat Rural District, in the Central District of Khorramabad County, Lorestan Province, Iran. At the 2006 census, its population was 12, in 4 families.
