= Zarrin Choqa Shahid Jabari =

Zarrin Choqa Shahid Jabari زرين چقاشهيدجابري
- Village
- Location within Iran
- Coordinates: 33°39′19″N 48°16′30″E
- Country: Iran
- Province: Lorestan
- County: Khorramabad
- Bakhsh: Central
- Rural District: Robat

Population (2006)
  - Total: 147
- Time zone: UTC+3:30 (IRST)
  - Summer (DST): UTC+4:30 (IRDT)

Zarrin Choqa Shahid Jabari (Persian: زرين چقاشهيدجابري, also Romanized as Zarrīn Choqā Shahīd Jābarī; also known as Zarrīn Choghā Shahīd Jābarī, Zarrīnchoghā-ye Vosţá, and Zarrīn Choghā) is a village in Robat Rural District, in the Central District of Khorramabad County, Lorestan Province, Iran. At the 2006 census, its population was 147, made up of 31 families.
