= Bagh Dai-ye Sofla =

Bagh Dai-ye Sofla باغ دايي سفلي
- Village
- Location within Iran
- Coordinates: 33°35′10″N 48°16′15″E
- Country: Iran
- Province: Lorestan
- County: Khorramabad
- Bakhsh: Central
- Rural District: Robat

Population (2006)
  - Total: 21
- Time zone: UTC+3:30 (IRST)
  - Summer (DST): UTC+4:30 (IRDT)

Bagh Dai-ye Sofla (Persian: باغ دايي سفلي, also Romanized as Bāgh Dā’ī-ye Soflá) is a village in Robat Rural District, in the Central District of Khorramabad County, Lorestan Province, Iran. At the 2006 census, its population was 21, in four families.
