= RABaD =

RABad (ראב״ד, pronounced also Raavad, Ravad or Raivid) is a Hebrew acronym which most commonly refers to Rabbi Abraham Ben David, or the RABaD III. There are three rabbis and scholars referred to by this acronym:

== People ==
- Rabbi Abraham ibn Daud, the first RABaD, a Spanish-Jewish philosopher and historian
- Rabbi Abraham ben Isaac of Narbonne the Eshkol, called RABad II, being an acronym for Rav Av Beth Din
- Rabbi Abraham ben David of Posquières, called RABaD III, a son-in-law of the former

== Other uses ==
- RABaD or Ravad, the head of any Rabbinical court, being an acronym for Rosh Beth Din
- Rábade or "San Vicenzo de Rábade", a town in the northwest of Spain in the province of Lugo

== See also ==
- Rabad
