= Sarab-e Robat =

Village in Lorestan province, Iran

Sarab-e Robat Persian: سراب رباط
- Village
- Location within Iran
- Coordinates: 33°39′01″N 48°17′54″E
- Country: Iran
- Province: Lorestan
- County: Khorramabad
- District: Central
- Rural District: Robat

Population (2016)
  - Total: 359
- Time zone: UTC+3:30 (IRST)

Sarab-e Robat (Persian: سراب رباط) (Note: Also romanized as Sarāb-e Robāţ) is a village in Robat Rural District of the Central District in Khorramabad County, Lorestan province, Iran.

== Demographics ==
=== Population ===
At the time of the 2006 National Census, the village's population was 432 in 88 households. The following census in 2011 counted 377 people in 94 households. The 2016 census measured the population of the village as 359 people in 97 households.
