= Robat-e Qaleqan =

Robat-e Qaleqan رباط قالقان
- Village
- Location within Iran
- Coordinates: 33°30′30″N 50°20′39″E
- Country: Iran
- Province: Isfahan
- County: Golpayegan
- Bakhsh: Central
- Rural District: Kenarrudkhaneh

Population (2006)
  - Total: 87
- Time zone: UTC+3:30 (IRST)
  - Summer (DST): UTC+4:30 (IRDT)

Robat-e Qaleqan (Persian: رباط قالقان, also Romanized as Robāţ-e Qāleqān and Robāţ-e Qālqān; also known as Robat Ghalghan) is a village in Kenarrudkhaneh Rural District, in the Central District of Golpayegan County, Isfahan Province, Iran. At the 2006 census, its population was 87, in 30 families.

== See also ==
- Robat (disambiguation)
