= Zarrin Choqa-ye Sofla =

Village in Lorestan, Iran

Zarrin Choqa-ye Sofla زرين چقاسفلي
- Village
- Location within Iran
- Coordinates: 33°38′46″N 48°16′09″E
- Country: Iran
- Province: Lorestan
- County: Khorramabad
- Bakhsh: Central
- Rural District: Robat

Population (2006)
  - Total: 37
- Time zone: UTC+3:30 (IRST)
  - Summer (DST): UTC+4:30 (IRDT)

Zarrin Choqa-ye Sofla (Persian: زرين چقاسفلي, also Romanized as Zarrīn Choqā-ye Soflá; also known as Zarrīn Choghā-ye Soflá, Zarrīn Chaghā-ye Soflá, Shahrak-e Jadīd-e Zarrīn Choqā-ye Soflá, Zarrīn Chaghā Bālā, and Zarrīn Choqā) is a village in Robat Rural District, in the Central District of Khorramabad County, Lorestan Province, Iran. At the 2006 census, its population was 37, in 7 families.
