= Qaleh Sangi, Lorestan =

Village in Lorestan province, Iran

Qaleh Sangi Persian: قلعه سنگي
- Village
- Location within Iran
- Coordinates: 33°33′44″N 48°17′59″E
- Country: Iran
- Province: Lorestan
- County: Khorramabad
- District: Central
- Rural District: Robat

Population (2016)
  - Total: 1,353
- Time zone: UTC+3:30 (IRST)

Qaleh Sangi (Persian: قلعه سنگي) (Note: Also romanized as Qal‘eh Sangī) is a village in Robat Rural District of the Central District in Khorramabad County, Lorestan province, Iran.

== Demographics ==
=== Population ===
At the time of the 2006 National Census, the village's population was 979 in 199 households. The following census in 2011 counted 1,192 people in 330 households. The 2016 census measured the population of the village as 1,353 people in 390 households.
