= Seyl Mish-e Sofla =

Seyl Mish-e Sofla سيل ميش سفلي
- Village
- Location within Iran
- Coordinates: 33°40′12″N 48°21′00″E
- Country: Iran
- Province: Lorestan
- County: Khorramabad
- Bakhsh: Central
- Rural District: Robat

Population (2006)
  - Total: 9
- Time zone: UTC+3:30 (IRST)
  - Summer (DST): UTC+4:30 (IRDT)

Seyl Mish-e Sofla (Persian: سيل ميش سفلي, also Romanized as Seyl Mīsh-e Soflá) is a village in Robat Rural District, in the Central District of Khorramabad County, Lorestan Province, Iran. At the 2006 census, its population was 9, in 5 families.
