= Ribat =

Small fortification

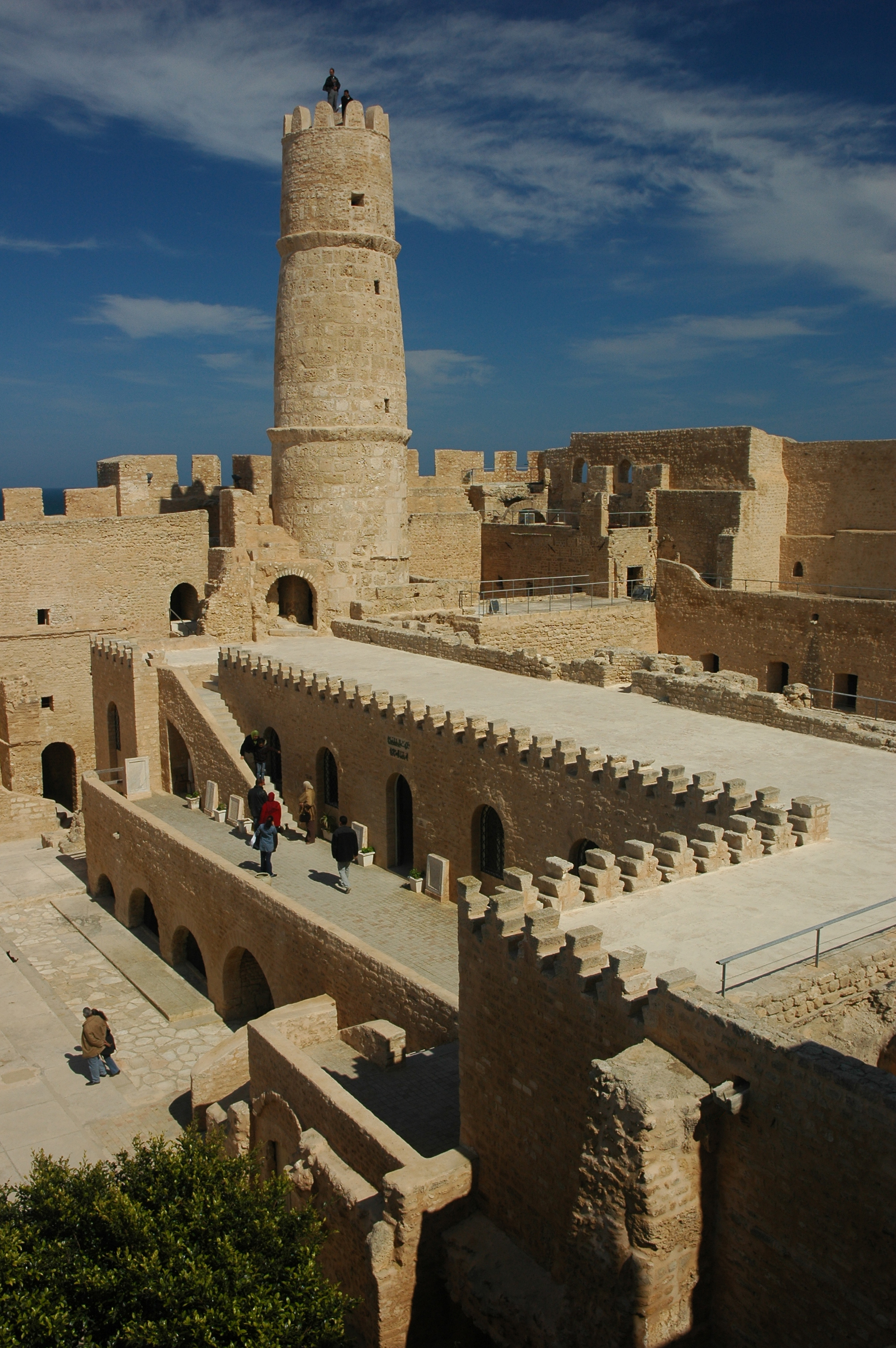
Ribat of Monastir, Tunisia

A ribāṭ (Arabic: رِبَـاط; hospice, hostel, base or retreat) is an Arabic term, initially designating a small fortification built along a frontier during the first years of the Muslim conquest of the Maghreb to house murabitun 'volunteer military personnel', and shortly, after they also appeared along the frontier with the Byzantine Empire, where they attracted converts from Khorasan, an area that would become known as al-ʿAwāṣim in the ninth century.

Ribat fortifications later served to protect commercial routes as caravanserais, to serve as centers for isolated Muslim communities, and as places of piety.

== Islamic meaning ==
=== Historical meaning ===
The word ribat in its abstract refers to voluntary defense of Islam, which is why ribats were originally used to house those who fought to defend Islam in jihad. They came to have the meaning Sufi lodge; in this form, they are known in New Persian as khanqah and in former Ottoman territories as tekkes.

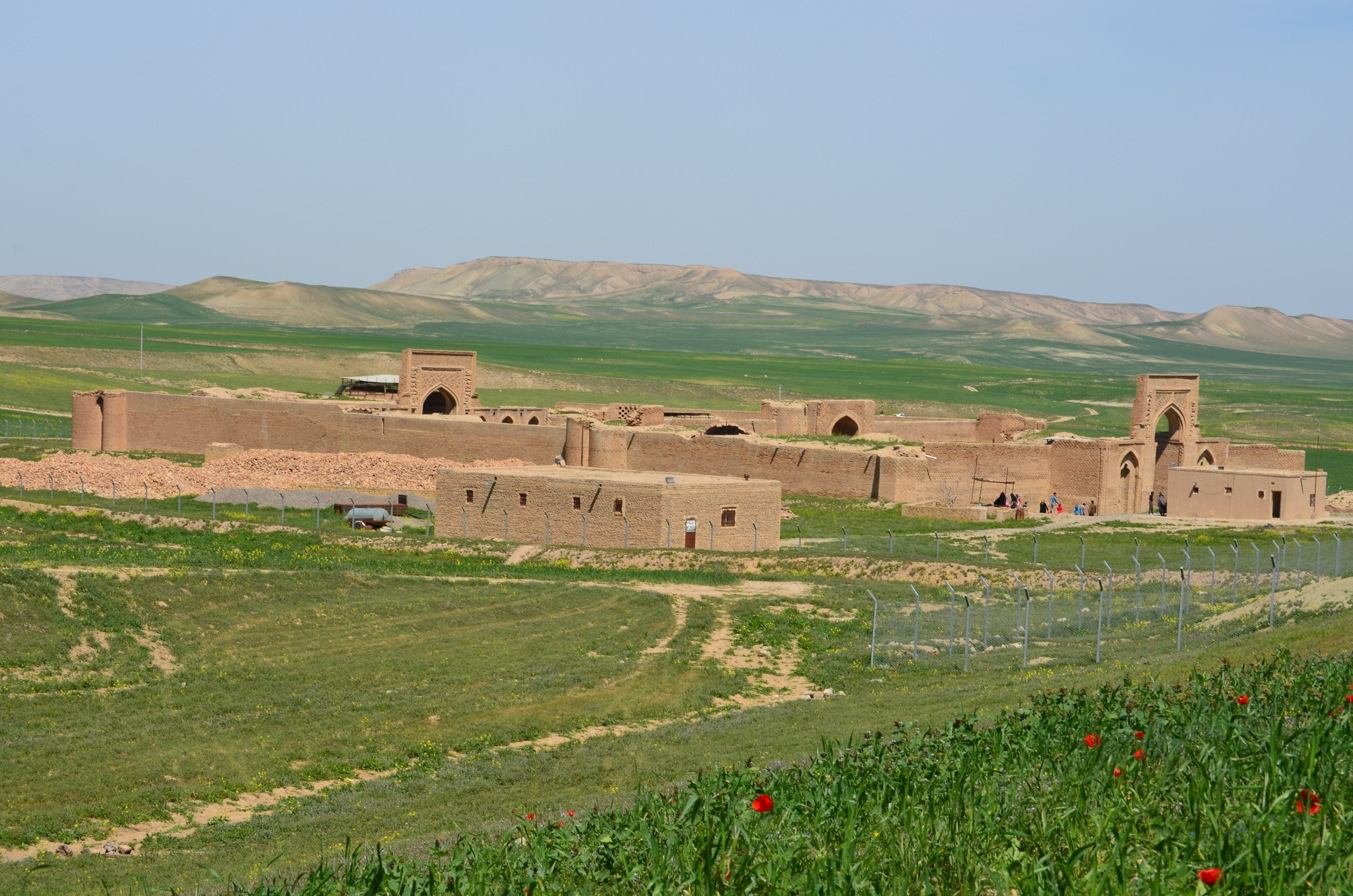
Ribat-i Sharaf, a historical caravanserai, in Iran

Classically, ribat referred to the guard duty at a frontier outpost to defend the Islamic world. The one who performs ribat is called a murabit.

=== Contemporary use ===
Contemporary use of the term ribat is common among jihadi groups such as al-Qaeda or the Islamic State. The term has also been used by jihadis of the Salafi movement operating in the Gaza Strip. In their terminology, ʻArḍ al-Ribat 'Land of the Ribat' is a name for Palestine understood in the context of their ideology of universal jihad, which is fundamentally opposed to Palestinian nationalism.

== As caravanserais ==
In time, some ribats became hostels for voyagers on major trade routes (caravanserai).

== As Sufi retreats ==
=== Sufi brotherhoods ===
Ribat was initially used to describe a frontier post where soldiers would stay during the early Muslim conquests and after, such as in al-Awasim. The term transformed over time to refer to a center for Sufi. As they were later no longer needed to house and supply soldiers, ribats became refuges for mystics. The ribat tradition was perhaps one of the early sources of the ṭarīqas, or Sufi mystic brotherhoods, and a type of the later zawiya or Sufi lodge, which spread into North Africa, and from there across the Sahara to West Africa. Here, they are the homes of marabouts: religious teachers, usually Sufis. Such places of spiritual retreat were termed khānqāhs (Persian: خانقاه). Usually, ribats were inhabited by a shaykh, and his family and visitors were allowed to come and learn from him. Many times, the tomb of the founder was also located in the same building. These centers' institutionalization was made possible partly through donations from wealthy merchants, landowners, and influential leaders. Some of these compounds also received regular stipends to maintain them.

Some important ribats to mention are the Rabati Malik (c.1068–80), which is in Uzbekistan in the Kyzylkum Desert and is still partially intact, and the Ribat of Sharaf from the 12th century, which was built in a square shape with a monumental portal, a courtyard, and long vaulted rooms along the walls. Most ribats had a similar architectural appearance which consisted of a surrounding wall with an entrance, living rooms, storehouses for provisions, a watch tower used to signal in the case of an invasion, four to eight towers, and a mosque in large ribats.

These institutions were used as a sort of school house where a shaykh could teach his disciples the ways of a specific ṭarīqa. They were also used as a place of worship where the shaykh could observe the members of the specific Sufi order and help them on their inner path to ḥaqīqa (Arabic: حَـقِـيْـقَـة, ultimate truth or reality).

=== Female Sufis ===
Another use of ribat refers to a sort of convent or retreat house for Sufi women. Female shaykhas (شيخة), scholars of law in medieval times, and large numbers of widows or divorcees lived in abstinence and worship in ribats.

== See also ==
- Almoravids
- Al-Awasim, Muslim side of the frontier between the Byzantine Empire and Early Islamic realm
- Khan, Persian word for caravanserai; Turkish variant: han
- Khanqah, building used specifically by a Sufi brotherhood
- Ksar, North African (usually Berber) fortified village
- List of caravanserais
- Rabad, Central Asian variant for 'rabat'
- Rabat (disambiguation), Semitic word for "fortified town" or "suburb"
- Robat (disambiguation), Persian variant for 'ribat'

List of Early Muslim ribats

- Cafarlet in Palestine
- Minat al-Qal'a in Palestine
