= Rabad =

Rabaḍ (Arabic: ربض, romanized: rabaḍ, lit. 'outskirts, suburb') refers to the suburbs of seventh- to eighth-century cities in Central Asia, including what is now the Turkistan Region in southern Kazakhstan, Iran, and Afghanistan.

This term, in the Andalusī Arabic form of ar-rabāḍ, was borrowed into Spanish as arrabal and into Portuguese as arrabalde.

== City layout ==
A typical qalʿa ("fortress") in Central Asia was based on a tripartite city model: citadel, shahristan (residential area inside the walls), and rabaḍ (suburb). This city model is valid not only for Central Asian city typology, but is also used to describe similar city types elsewhere in the Muslim world.

== See also ==
Related

- Rabat (disambiguation), Arabic word for 'fortified town' or 'suburb'
- Rábade, town in Galicia, Spain
- Ribat, Arabic word for Early Muslim frontier fort, later caravansary and Sufi retreat
- Robat (disambiguation), Persian variant for 'ribat'

Other

- RABaD (disambiguation), Hebrew acronym for Rabbi Abraham Ben David. See page for the most famous 3 by this name.
