= Qaleh Now, Lorestan =

Village in Lorestan province, Iran

Qaleh Now Persian: قلعه نو
- Village
- Location within Iran
- Coordinates: 33°37′50″N 48°24′45″E
- Country: Iran
- Province: Lorestan
- County: Khorramabad
- District: Central
- Rural District: Robat

Population (2016)
  - Total: 339
- Time zone: UTC+3:30 (IRST)

Qaleh Now (Persian: قلعه نو) (Note: Also romanized as Qal‘eh Now) is a village in Robat Rural District of the Central District in Khorramabad County, Lorestan province, Iran.

== Demographics ==
=== Population ===
At the time of the 2006 National Census, the village's population was 334 in 68 households. The following census in 2011 counted 292 people in 82 households. The 2016 census measured the population of the village as 339 people in 97 households.
