= Robat Rural District =

Robat Rural District (Persian: دهستان رباط) may refer to:

- Robat Rural District (Lorestan Province)
- Robat Rural District (Razavi Khorasan Province)

== See also ==
- Robat-e Jaz Rural District
