= Robat-e Khakestari =

Village in Razavi Khorasan, Iran

Robat-e Khakestari رباطخاكستري
- Village
- Location within Iran
- Coordinates: 36°06′11″N 59°38′58″E
- Country: Iran
- Province: Razavi Khorasan
- County: Mashhad
- Bakhsh: Ahmadabad
- Rural District: Sarjam

Population (2006)
  - Total: 119
- Time zone: UTC+3:30 (IRST)
  - Summer (DST): UTC+4:30 (IRDT)

Robat-e Khakestari (Persian: رباطخاكستري, also Romanized as Robāţ-e Khākestarī) is a village in Sarjam Rural District, Ahmadabad District, Mashhad County, Razavi Khorasan Province, Iran. At the 2006 census, its population was 119, in 31 families.
