= Ribat-i Sharaf =

Coordinates: 36.2664°N 60.6555°E

Rebat-e Sharaf
- رباط شرف (Persian)
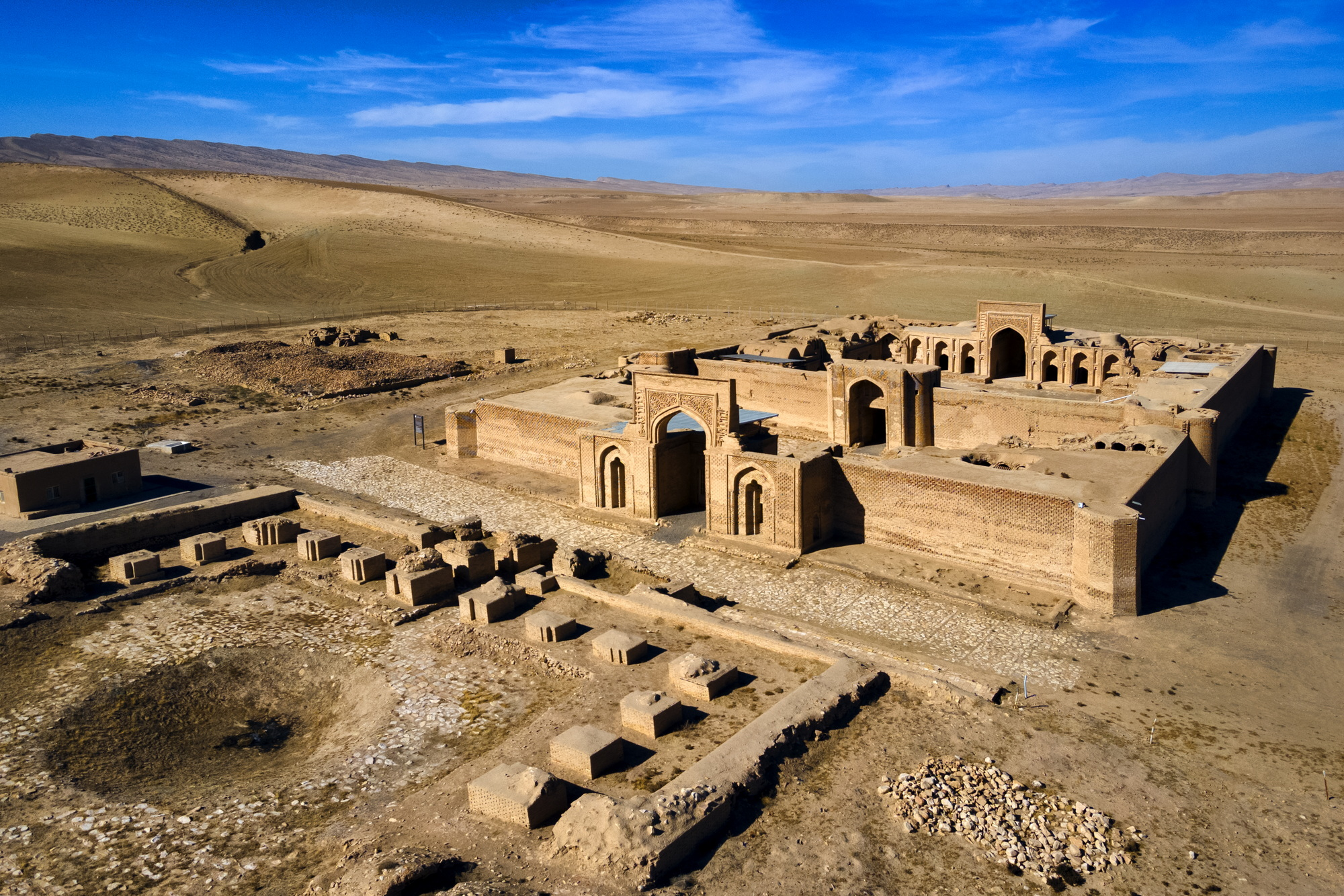

General information
- Type: Ribat, Caravanserai
- Architectural style: Seljuk, Iranian
- Location: Sarakhs, Khorasan-e Razavi Province, Iran,
- Year built: 1114-15, 1154

Technical details
- Grounds: 4,863 square metres (52,340 sq ft)

UNESCO World Heritage Site
- Part of: The Persian Caravanserai
- Criteria: (ii)(iii)
- Reference: 1668
- Inscription: 2023 (45th Session)

Iran National Heritage List
- Official name: Rebat-e Sharaf
- Type: Carvanserai
- Designated: 1942
- Reference no.: 359
- Conservation organization: Cultural Heritage, Handicrafts and Tourism Organization of Iran

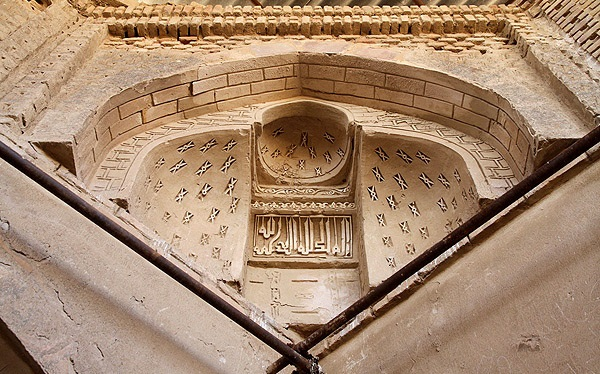

Ribat-i Sharaf (Persian: رباط شرف, pronounced [ɹeˌbɒːt‿e ʃæˈɹæf]) is a historical caravanserai, or rest place for travellers, located in Razavi Khorasan province, Iran, between Merv and Nishapur. Built in the 12th century (first built 1114–15), the building looks like a fortified rectangle from the exterior. The internal courtyard and four-iwan floor plan is a traditional characteristic of Iranian architecture and of Islamic architecture in the wider region.

== Historical background ==
In a desert area along the route between the cities of Marv and Nishapur lies the Ribat-i Sharaf, named after Sharaf al-Din ibn Tahir or Sharaf al-Din Qummi who is believed to be its patron. Sharaf al-Din served as the governor of Khorasan for forty years and as a vizier during the reign of Sultan Sanjar (1118–1157). Not long after its construction, the building suffered destruction at the hands of Bedouins. However, it was soon, in 1154 restored and remodeled by Turkan Khatun, the daughter of the Khan and the wife of Sultan Sanjar.

== Architecture ==
The ribat preserves significant decorative elements and exquisite inscriptions that reflect the artistic characteristics of the period. It stands as an exceptional example of caravanserais and ribats from that era.

The ribat consists of two sections within a single architectural framework. The entrance is located on the southeast side through a pishtaq, leading to a long iwan that opens onto an open rectangular courtyard. Along the same axial alignment, a corridor connects this courtyard to another open space, this time square-shaped. Continuing along this straight path leads to the second section of the ribat, culminating in another iwan and a dome. This axial line, beginning from the pishtaq at the façade and ending at the dome, divides the ribat into two nearly symmetrical halves.

The first section of the building, which includes the rectangular courtyard, is surrounded on three sides: the southeast side housing the main entrance, the northeast aisle, and the southwest aisle. These three aisle are covered, with each featuring a central iwan. The northeast and southwest iwans share identical architectural compositions, each topped with a shallow dome. The main entrance iwan, however, is distinguished by the pishtaq at the entrance. The remaining covered areas, excluding the iwans, comprise small rooms intended for travelers and merchants. This section was primarily designated for visitors and itinerant merchants traveling along the Silk Road and the trade route on which this caravanserai is situated.

== See also ==
- Islamic architecture
- Islamic art
- Robat (disambiguation)
- Timeline of Islamic history
