= Papi Khaldar-e Olya =

Village in Lorestan province, Iran

Papi Khaldar-e Olya Persian: پاپي خالدارعليا
- Village
- Location within Iran
- Coordinates: 33°32′34″N 48°19′46″E
- Country: Iran
- Province: Lorestan
- County: Khorramabad
- District: Central
- Rural District: Robat

Population (2016)
  - Total: 3,115
- Time zone: UTC+3:30 (IRST)

Papi Khaldar-e Olya (Persian: پاپي خالدارعليا) (Note: Also romanized as Pāpī Khāldār-e ‘Olyā; also known as Pāpī Khāldār and Pāpī Khāldār-e Bālā) is a village in Robat Rural District of the Central District in Khorramabad County, Lorestan province, Iran.

== Demographics ==
=== Population ===
At the time of the 2006 National Census, the village's population was 859 in 182 households. The following census in 2011 counted 1,466 people in 376 households. The 2016 census measured the population of the village as 3,115 people in 904 households, the most populous in its rural district.
