= Rabbath =

Rabbath may refer to:

- Rabbath Ammon
- Rabbath Moab
- François Rabbath (born 1931), French double-bass player
- Jean-Claude Rabbath (born 1977), High jumper
- F.C. Rabbath (born 1986), American inventor, Filmmaker
