= Dowlatabad, Khorramabad =

Village in Lorestan province, Iran

Dowlatabad Persian: دولت اباد
- Village
- Location within Iran
- Coordinates: 33°37′49″N 48°17′37″E
- Country: Iran
- Province: Lorestan
- County: Khorramabad
- District: Central
- Rural District: Robat

Population (2016)
  - Total: 781
- Time zone: UTC+3:30 (IRST)

Dowlatabad (Persian: دولت اباد) (Note: Also romanized as Dowlatābād; also known as Dowlatābād-e Robāţ, Robāţ, and Robāţ-e Dowlatābād) is a village in Robat Rural District of the Central District in Khorramabad County, Lorestan province, Iran.

== Demographics ==
=== Population ===
At the time of the 2006 National Census, the village's population was 807 in 152 households. The following census in 2011 counted 862 people in 210 households. The 2016 census measured the population of the village as 781 people in 205 households.
