= Rabat, Battagram =

Rabat
- Town and union council
- Country: Pakistan
- Region: Khyber-Pakhtunkhwa
- District: Battagram District
- Time zone: UTC+5 (PST)

Rabat is a town and union council in Battagram District of Khyber-Pakhtunkhwa, Pakistan.
