= Robat-e Namaki =

Village in Lorestan province, Iran

Robat-e Namaki Persian: رباط نمکی
- Village
- Location within Iran
- Coordinates: 33°36′32″N 48°18′15″E
- Country: Iran
- Province: Lorestan
- County: Khorramabad
- District: Central
- Rural District: Robat

Population (2016)
  - Total: 595
- Time zone: UTC+3:30 (IRST)

Robat-e Namaki (Persian: رباط نمکی) (Note: Also romanized as Robāţ-e Namakī; also known as Robāţ and Rubāt-i-Namak) is a village in, and the capital of, Robat Rural District in the Central District of Khorramabad County, Lorestan province, Iran.

== Demographics ==
=== Population ===
At the time of the 2006 National Census, the village's population was 606 in 129 households. The following census in 2011 counted 540 people in 151 households. The 2016 census measured the population of the village as 595 people in 178 households.
