= Robati, Iran =

Robati رباطي
- Village
- Location within Iran
- Coordinates: 36°12′40″N 58°31′35″E
- Country: Iran
- Province: Razavi Khorasan
- County: Firuzeh
- Bakhsh: Central
- Rural District: Takht-e Jolgeh

Population (2006)
  - Total: 135
- Time zone: UTC+3:30 (IRST)
  - Summer (DST): UTC+4:30 (IRDT)

Robati (Persian: رباطي, also Romanized as Robāţī; also known as Robāţ) is a village in Takht-e Jolgeh Rural District, in the Central District of Firuzeh County, Razavi Khorasan Province, Iran. At the 2006 census, its population was 135, in 32 families.
