= Zarrin Choqa =

Zarrin Choqa زرين چقا
- Village
- Location within Iran
- Coordinates: 34°38′14″N 46°41′33″E
- Country: Iran
- Province: Kermanshah
- County: Ravansar
- Bakhsh: Central
- Rural District: Hasanabad

Population (2006)
  - Total: 252
- Time zone: UTC+3:30 (IRST)
  - Summer (DST): UTC+4:30 (IRDT)

Zarrin Choqa (Persian: زرين چقا, also Romanized as Zarrīn Choqā) is a village in Hasanabad Rural District, in the Central District of Ravansar County, Kermanshah Province, Iran. At the 2006 census, its population was 252, in 55 families.
