= Papi Khaldar-e Sofla =

Village in Lorestan province, Iran

Papi Khaldar-e Sofla Persian: پاپي خالدارسفلي
- Village
- Location within Iran
- Coordinates: 33°32′23″N 48°19′23″E
- Country: Iran
- Province: Lorestan
- County: Khorramabad
- District: Central
- Rural District: Robat

Population (2016)
  - Total: 377
- Time zone: UTC+3:30 (IRST)

Papi Khaldar-e Sofla (Persian: پاپي خالدارسفلي) (Note: Also romanized as Pāpī Khāldār-e Soflá) is a village in Robat Rural District of the Central District in Khorramabad County, Lorestan province, Iran.

== Demographics ==
=== Population ===
At the time of the 2006 National Census, the village's population was 230 in 44 households. The following census in 2011 counted 133 people in 37 households. The 2016 census measured the population of the village as 377 people in 115 households.
