= Robat-e Aghaj =

Robat-e Aghaj رباطاغاج
- Village
- Location within Iran
- Coordinates: 33°49′16″N 50°06′06″E
- Country: Iran
- Province: Markazi
- County: Khomeyn
- Bakhsh: Central
- Rural District: Hamzehlu

Population (2006)
  - Total: 120
- Time zone: UTC+3:30 (IRST)
  - Summer (DST): UTC+4:30 (IRDT)

Robat-e Aghaj (Persian: رباطاغاج, also Romanized as Robāţ-e Āghāj and Robat Aghaj) is a village in Hamzehlu Rural District, in the Central District of Khomeyn County, Markazi Province, Iran. At the 2006 census, its population was 120, in 36 families.
