= Robat, Fars =

Robat رباط
- Village
- Location within Iran
- Coordinates: 30°03′18″N 51°17′08″E
- Country: Iran
- Province: Fars
- County: Mamasani
- Bakhsh: Mahvarmilani
- Rural District: Mahur

Population (2006)
  - Total: 147
- Time zone: UTC+3:30 (IRST)
  - Summer (DST): UTC+4:30 (IRDT)

Robat (Persian: رباط, also Romanized as Robāţ) is a village in Mahur Rural District, Mahvarmilani District, Mamasani County, Fars province, Iran. At the 2006 census, its population was 147, in 29 families.
