= Aliabad, Galehzan =

Aliabad علي اباد
- Village
- Location within Iran
- Coordinates: 33°39′58″N 50°10′44″E
- Country: Iran
- Province: Markazi
- County: Khomeyn
- Bakhsh: Central
- Rural District: Galehzan

Population (2006)
  - Total: 39
- Time zone: UTC+3:30 (IRST)
  - Summer (DST): UTC+4:30 (IRDT)

Aliabad (Persian: علي اباد, also Romanized as ‘Alīābād; also known as Ali Abad Rostag and Robāţ-e ‘Alīābād) is a village in Galehzan Rural District, in the Central District of Khomeyn County, Markazi Province, Iran. At the 2006 census, its population was 39, in 15 families.
