= Fakhr-e Davud =

Fakhr-e Davud فخرداود
- Village
- Location within Iran
- Coordinates: 36°00′06″N 59°18′54″E
- Country: Iran
- Province: Razavi Khorasan
- County: Mashhad
- Bakhsh: Ahmadabad
- Rural District: Piveh Zhan

Population (2006)
  - Total: 756
- Time zone: UTC+3:30 (IRST)
  - Summer (DST): UTC+4:30 (IRDT)

Fakhr-e Davud (Persian: فخرداود, also Romanized as Fakhr-e Dāvūd; also known as Ribāt-i-Fakhr-i-Dāūd, Robāţ, and Robāţ-e Fakhr-e Dāvūd) is a village in Piveh Zhan Rural District, Ahmadabad District, Mashhad County, Razavi Khorasan Province, Iran. At the 2006 census, its population was 756, in 215 families.
