= Sheikh Bastami Mosque =

Mosque, mausoleum, and madrasah in Bastam, Semnan Province, Iran

- مسجد شیخ بسطامی
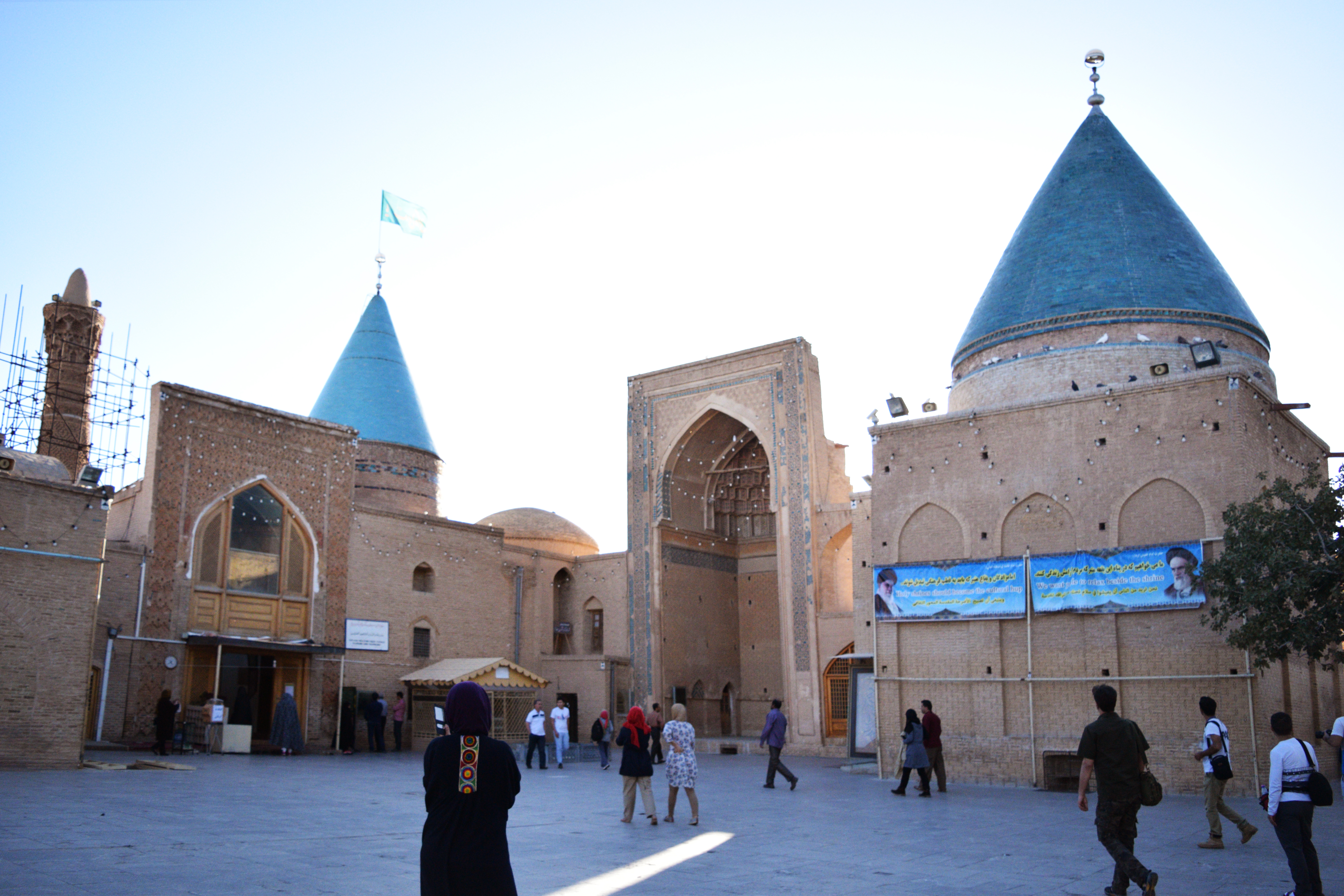

- Location of the mosque in Iran

Religion
- Affiliation: Sunni Islam
- Sect: Sufism
- Ecclesiastical or organisational status: Mosque; Mausoleum; Madrasah
- Status: Active

Location
- Location: Bastam, Shahrud County, Semnan Province
- Country: Iran
- Coordinates: 36°29′3″N 55°0′1″E

Architecture
- Architect: Muhammad ibn al-Husayn al-Damghani
- Type: Mosque architecture
- Style: Abbasid; Seljuk; Ilkhanid; Qajar
- Completed: 7th century CE; 514 AH (1120/1121 CE) (renovation); 699 AH (1299/1300 CE) (renovation); 1839 CE (renovation / annex)

Specifications
- Dome: Two
- Minaret: One
- Minaret height: 20 m (66 ft)
- Materials: Bricks; mortar

Iran National Heritage List
- Official name: Mausoleum of Sheikh Bastami
- Type: Mausoleum
- Designated: 1932
- Reference no.: 68
- Conservation organization: Cultural Heritage, Handicrafts and Tourism Organization of Iran

The Sheikh Bastami Mosque (Persian: مسجد شیخ بسطامی, romanized: Mashhad-i Bayazid Bastami; Arabic: مسجد الشيخ بسطامي) is an Islamic religious complex comprising a mosque, mausoleum, and madrasah, located in downtown Bastam, in the province of Semnan, Iran. Completed in the 14th-century, the complex is named after Sufi saint Abu Yazid al-Bastami, better known as Bayazid Bastami, who is buried in that place alongside Muhammad ibn Ja'far al-Sadiq.

The mosque was added to the Iran National Heritage List on 6 January 1932 and is administered by the Cultural Heritage, Handicrafts and Tourism Organization of Iran.

== History ==
Construction on the shrine of Bayazid Bastami is theorised to have predated the Seljuk era, but the oldest inscription extant on the building gives the date of construction as 514 AH (1120/1121 CE). During the reign of the Ilkhanid ruler Mahmud Ghazan, the religious complex underwent restoration in 699 AH (1299/1300 CE). After his death, his successor Öljeitü added an eastern entrance portal and a corridor, as well as an iwan across the courtyard of the mosque. Later on, the Timurid ruler Shah Rukh attached a madrasah to the religious complex.

== Architecture ==
The main iwan leading into the religious complex is formed of a tall arch with a semi-dome of muqarnas, the walls covered with faience and unglazed terracotta. The mosque building is decorated with carved stucco, which dates back to the restoration under Mahmud Ghazan. Several design elements of the mosque building is Seljuk, such as the 20-metre-tall (66 ft) minaret and one of the walls. This mosque also has two shabestan, the larger one is used for men and the smaller one is used for women.

The tomb of Bayazid Bastami is located directly next to one of the walls of the complex, in the courtyard. It is a simple structure and is not lavish, possibly to reflect the piety and asceticsm of the entombed saint.

The tomb of Muhammad ibn Ja'far al-Sadiq is located on the southern side of the religious complex. It has a conical dome over it, and the tomb is located under the dome. The tomb is sometimes known as an Imamzadeh.

== See also ==
- Islam in Iran
- List of mosques in Iran
- List of imamzadehs in Iran
