= Robat-e Olya, Markazi =

Robat-e Olya رباط عليا
- Village
- Location within Iran
- Coordinates: 33°45′02″N 49°46′01″E
- Country: Iran
- Province: Markazi
- County: Khomeyn
- Bakhsh: Kamareh
- Rural District: Khorram Dasht

Population (2006)
  - Total: 67
- Time zone: UTC+3:30 (IRST)
  - Summer (DST): UTC+4:30 (IRDT)

Robat-e Olya (Persian: رباط عليا, also Romanized as Robāţ-e ‘Olyā and Robāt Olyā) is a village in Khorram Dasht Rural District, Kamareh District, Khomeyn County, Markazi Province, Iran. At the 2006 census, its population was 67, in 14 families.
