= Khosrow Parviz hunting ground =

Coordinates: 34°22′39″N 47°07′38″E

Archeological exploration about khosrow parviz hunting ground in year 2009

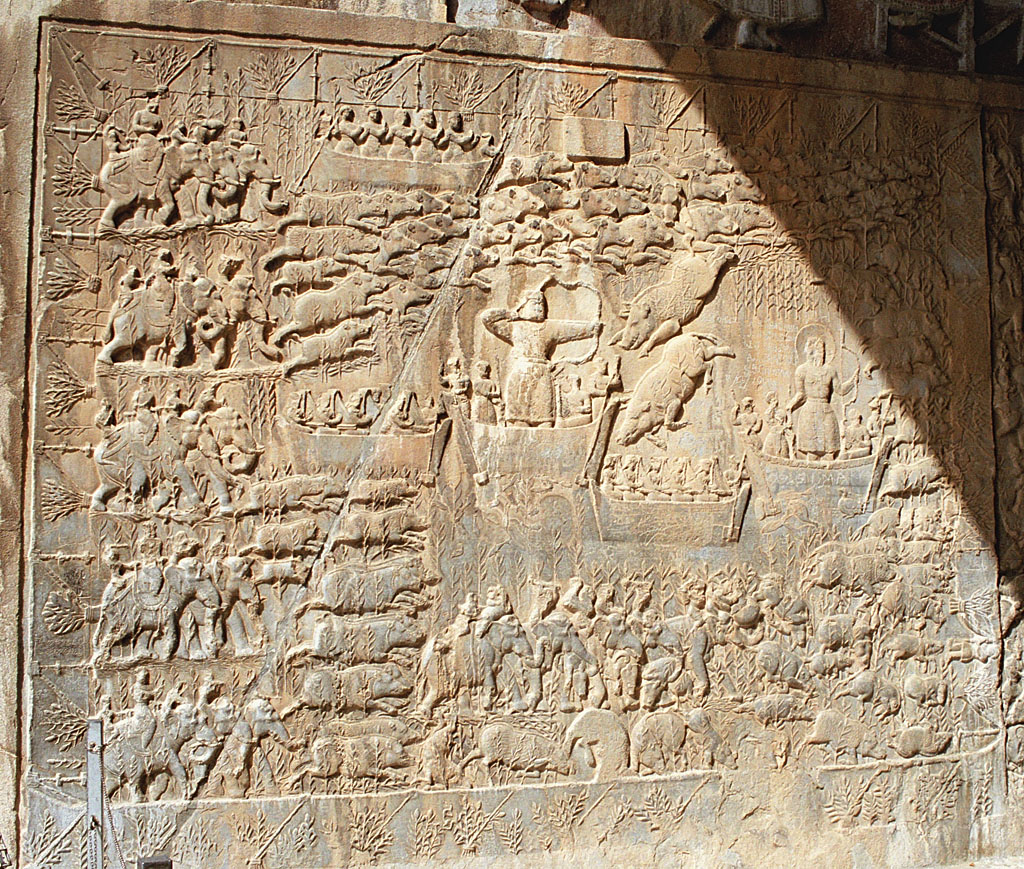
Inscriptions from Khosrow parviz hunting ground on a stone inscription in Taq-e Bostan

Khosrow parviz hunting ground (Persian:شکارگاه خسرو پرویز) or Tape-ye-moradhasel or Morad-Hassel Tepe (Persian:تپه مرادحاصل) is an ancient Sasanid complex in the north of Kermanshah city in western Iran.
