= Robat-e Olya, Khuzestan =

Robat-e Olya رباطعليا
- Village
- Location within Iran
- Coordinates: 31°34′54″N 50°00′13″E
- Country: Iran
- Province: Khuzestan
- County: Bagh-e Malek
- Bakhsh: Central
- Rural District: Mongasht

Population (2006)
  - Total: 930
- Time zone: UTC+3:30 (IRST)
  - Summer (DST): UTC+4:30 (IRDT)

Robat-e Olya (Persian: رباطعليا, also Romanized as Robāţ-e ‘Olyā; also known as Robāţ) is a village in Mongasht Rural District, in the Central District of Bagh-e Malek County, Khuzestan Province, Iran. At the 2006 census, its population was 930, in 197 families.
