= Robat-e Sofla, Markazi =

Robat-e Sofla رباطسفلي
- Village
- Location within Iran
- Coordinates: 33°44′10″N 49°47′40″E
- Country: Iran
- Province: Markazi
- County: Khomeyn
- Bakhsh: Kamareh
- Rural District: Khorram Dasht

Population (2006)
  - Total: 81
- Time zone: UTC+3:30 (IRST)
  - Summer (DST): UTC+4:30 (IRDT)

Robat-e Sofla (Persian: رباطسفلي, also Romanized as Robāţ-e Soflá and Robāt Soflá; also known as Robāţ) is a village in Khorram Dasht Rural District, Kamareh District, Khomeyn County, Markazi Province, Iran. At the 2006 census, its population was 81, in 16 families.
