= Robat-e Sofla, Khuzestan =

Robat-e Sofla رباطسفلي
- Village
- Location within Iran
- Coordinates: 31°34′16″N 50°00′19″E
- Country: Iran
- Province: Khuzestan
- County: Bagh-e Malek
- Bakhsh: Central
- Rural District: Mongasht

Population (2006)
  - Total: 88
- Time zone: UTC+3:30 (IRST)
  - Summer (DST): UTC+4:30 (IRDT)

Robat-e Sofla (Persian: رباطسفلي, also Romanized as Robāţ-e Soflá) is a village in Mongasht Rural District, in the Central District of Bagh-e Malek County, Khuzestan Province, Iran. At the 2006 census, its population was 88, in 16 families.
