= Robat Rural District (Khorramabad County) =

Rural district in Lorestan province, Iran

Robat Rural District Persian: دهستان رباط
- Rural District
- Location within Iran
- Coordinates: 33°36′N 48°16′E
- Country: Iran
- Province: Lorestan
- County: Khorramabad
- District: Central
- Established: 1987
- Capital: Robat-e Namaki

Population (2016)
  - Total: 10,599
- Time zone: UTC+3:30 (IRST)

Robat Rural District (Persian: دهستان رباط) is in the Central District of Khorramabad County, Lorestan province, Iran. Its capital is the village of Robat-e Namaki.

== Demographics ==
=== Population ===
At the time of the 2006 National Census, the rural district's population was 8,193 in 1,670 households. There were 8,400 inhabitants in 2,184 households at the following census of 2011. The 2016 census measured the population of the rural district as 10,599 in 3,008 households. The most populous of its 56 villages was Papi Khaldar-e Olya, with 3,115 people.

=== Other villages in the rural district ===
- Dowlatabad
- Papi Khaldar-e Sofla
- Qaleh Now
- Qaleh Sangi
- Rimaleh
- Sarab-e Robat
