= Nivan, Iran =

Nivan or Niwan (Persian: نيوان) in Iran may refer to:

- Nivan-e Nar
- Nivan-e Suq
- Nivan Rural District
