= Saidabad, Golpayegan =

Village in Isfahan province, Iran

Saidabad Persian: سعيداباد
- Village
- Location within Iran
- Coordinates: 33°31′51″N 50°19′13″E
- Country: Iran
- Province: Isfahan
- County: Golpayegan
- District: Central
- Rural District: Kenarrudkhaneh

Population (2016)
  - Total: 1,629
- Time zone: UTC+3:30 (IRST)

Saidabad (Persian: سعيداباد) (Note: Also romanized as Sa‘īdābād) is a village in, and the capital of, Kenarrudkhaneh Rural District in the Central District of Golpayegan County, Isfahan province, Iran.

== Demographics ==
=== Population ===
At the time of the 2006 National Census, the village's population was 1,949 in 536 households. The following census in 2011 counted 1,928 people in 578 households. The 2016 census measured the population of the village as 1,629 people in 545 households.
