= Sar Avar =

Village in Isfahan province, Iran

Sar Avar Persian: سراور
- Village
- Location within Iran
- Coordinates: 33°29′43″N 50°24′16″E
- Country: Iran
- Province: Isfahan
- County: Golpayegan
- District: Central
- Rural District: Jolgeh

Population (2016)
  - Total: 386
- Time zone: UTC+3:30 (IRST)

Sar Avar (Persian: سراور) (Note: Also romanized as Sar Āvar and Sarāwar) is a village in Jolgeh Rural District of the Central District in Golpayegan County, Isfahan province, Iran.

== Demographics ==
=== Population ===
At the time of the 2006 National Census, the village's population was 539 in 172 households. The following census in 2011 counted 440 people in 160 households. The 2016 census measured the population of the village as 386 people in 157 households.
