= Robat-e Mahmud =

Village in Isfahan province, Iran

Robat-e Mahmud Persian: رباط محمود
- Village
- Location within Iran
- Coordinates: 33°32′25″N 50°20′24″E
- Country: Iran
- Province: Isfahan
- County: Golpayegan
- District: Central
- Rural District: Kenarrudkhaneh

Population (2016)
  - Total: 164
- Time zone: UTC+3:30 (IRST)

Robat-e Mahmud (Persian: رباط محمود) (Note: Also romanized as Robat Mahmood and Robāţ-e Maḩmūd) is a village in Kenarrudkhaneh Rural District of the Central District of Golpayegan County, Isfahan province, Iran.

== Demographics ==
=== Population ===
At the time of the 2006 National Census, the village's population was 230 in 77 households. The following census in 2011 counted 207 people in 75 households. The 2016 census measured the population of the village as 164 people in 64 households.
