= Arjan, Isfahan =

Village in Isfahan province, Iran

Arjan Persian: آرجان
- Village
- Location within Iran
- Coordinates: 33°29′50″N 50°22′48″E
- Country: Iran
- Province: Isfahan
- County: Golpayegan
- District: Central
- Rural District: Jolgeh

Population (2016)
  - Total: 178
- Time zone: UTC+3:30 (IRST)

Arjan (Persian: آرجان) (Note: Also romanized as Ārjān; formerly known as Arjun (ارجون), also romanized as Ārjūn) is a village in Jolgeh Rural District of the Central District in Golpayegan County, Isfahan province, Iran.

== Demographics ==
=== Population ===
At the time of the 2006 National Census, the village's population, as Arjun, was 268 in 76 households. The following census in 2011 counted 218 people in 63 households, by which time the village was listed as Arjan. The 2016 census measured the population of the village as 178 people in 68 households.
