= Dor, Iran =

Village in Isfahan province, Iran

Dor Persian: در
- Village
- Location within Iran
- Coordinates: 33°17′19″N 50°37′46″E
- Country: Iran
- Province: Isfahan
- County: Golpayegan
- District: Central
- Rural District: Nivan

Population (2016)
  - Total: 230
- Time zone: UTC+3:30 (IRST)

Dor (Persian: در) (Note: Also romanized as Dar and Dorr; also known as Dowr and Durr) is a village in Nivan Rural District of the Central District in Golpayegan County, Isfahan province, Iran.

== Demographics ==
=== Population ===
At the time of the 2006 National Census, the village's population was 396 in 171 households. The following census in 2011 counted 279 people in 131 households. The 2016 census measured the population of the village as 230 people in 117 households.
