= Hendeh =

Village in Isfahan province, Iran

Hendeh Persian: هنده
- Village
- Location within Iran
- Coordinates: 33°23′47″N 50°01′10″E
- Country: Iran
- Province: Isfahan
- County: Golpayegan
- District: Central
- Rural District: Kenarrudkhaneh

Population (2016)
  - Total: 394
- Time zone: UTC+3:30 (IRST)

Hendeh (Persian: هنده) is a village in Kenarrudkhaneh Rural District of the Central District of Golpayegan County, Isfahan province, Iran.

== Demographics ==
=== Population ===
At the time of the 2006 National Census, the village's population was 654 in 130 households. The following census in 2011 counted 281 people in 99 households. The 2016 census measured the population of the village as 394 people in 143 households.
