= Tikan =

Village in Isfahan province, Iran

Tikan Persian: تيكن
- Village
- Location within Iran
- Coordinates: 33°20′19″N 50°33′18″E
- Country: Iran
- Province: Isfahan
- County: Golpayegan
- District: Central
- Rural District: Nivan

Population (2016)
  - Total: 230
- Time zone: UTC+3:30 (IRST)

Tikan (Persian: تيكن) (Note: Also romanized as Tīkan and Tīken) is a village in Nivan Rural District of the Central District in Golpayegan County, Isfahan province, Iran.

== Demographics ==
=== Population ===
At the time of the 2006 National Census, the village's population was 403 in 126 households. The following census in 2011 counted 284 people in 106 households. The 2016 census measured the population of the village as 230 people in 95 households.
