= Dom-e Asman =

Village in Isfahan province, Iran

Dom-e Asman Persian: دم اسمان
- Village
- Location within Iran
- Coordinates: 33°32′06″N 50°26′32″E
- Country: Iran
- Province: Isfahan
- County: Golpayegan
- District: Central
- Rural District: Jolgeh

Population (2016)
  - Total: 413
- Time zone: UTC+3:30 (IRST)

Dom-e Asman (Persian: دم اسمان) (Note: Also romanized as Dam Asman, Dom Āsmān, and Dom-e Āsmān; also known as Dum Āsmān) is a village in Jolgeh Rural District of the Central District in Golpayegan County, Isfahan province, Iran.

== Demographics ==
=== Population ===
At the time of the 2006 National Census, the village's population was 348 in 112 households. The following census in 2011 counted 402 people in 123 households. The 2016 census measured the population of the village as 413 people in 143 households.
