= Sheydabad =

Village in Isfahan province, Iran

Sheydabad Persian: شيداباد
- Village
- Location within Iran
- Coordinates: 33°30′29″N 50°23′27″E
- Country: Iran
- Province: Isfahan
- County: Golpayegan
- District: Central
- Rural District: Jolgeh

Population (2016)
  - Total: 231
- Time zone: UTC+3:30 (IRST)

Sheydabad (Persian: شيداباد) (Note: Also romanized as Sheydābād; also known as Shaydabadand Shaydābād) is a village in Jolgeh Rural District of the Central District in Golpayegan County, Isfahan province, Iran.

== Demographics ==
=== Population ===
At the time of the 2006 National Census, the village's population was 297 in 99 households. The following census in 2011 counted 220 people in 85 households. The 2016 census measured the population of the village as 231 people in 88 households.
