= Varnian =

Village in Isfahan province, Iran

Varnian Persian: وارنيان
- Village
- Location within Iran
- Coordinates: 33°30′38″N 50°22′39″E
- Country: Iran
- Province: Isfahan
- County: Golpayegan
- District: Central
- Rural District: Jolgeh

Population (2016)
  - Total: 112
- Time zone: UTC+3:30 (IRST)

Varnian (Persian: وارنيان) (Note: Also romanized as Vārneyān and Vārnīān; also known as Vārīnān) is a village in Jolgeh Rural District of the Central District in Golpayegan County, Isfahan province, Iran.

== Demographics ==
=== Population ===
At the time of the 2006 National Census, the village's population was 107 in 35 households. The following census in 2011 counted 96 people in 34 households. The 2016 census measured the population of the village as 112 people in 44 households.
