= Mazraeh, Isfahan =

Village in Isfahan province, Iran

Mazraeh Persian: مزرعه
- Village
- Location within Iran
- Coordinates: 33°32′05″N 50°21′46″E
- Country: Iran
- Province: Isfahan
- County: Golpayegan
- District: Central
- Rural District: Kenarrudkhaneh

Population (2016)
  - Total: 211
- Time zone: UTC+3:30 (IRST)

Mazraeh (Persian: مزرعه) (Note: Also romanized as Mazra‘eh) is a village in Kenarrudkhaneh Rural District of the Central District of Golpayegan County, Isfahan province, Iran.

== Demographics ==
=== Population ===
At the time of the 2006 National Census, the village's population was 224 in 75 households. The following census in 2011 counted 180 people in 69 households. The 2016 census measured the population of the village as 211 people in 88 households.
