= Qurghan =

Qurghan may refer to:

- Qurghan, Iran
- Qurghan, Isfahan, Iran
- Qurghan, Semnan, Iran
- Qurghan District, in Afghanistan
