= Shurcheh, Golpayegan =

Village in Isfahan province, Iran

Shurcheh Persian: شورچه
- Village
- Location within Iran
- Coordinates: 33°18′53″N 50°34′33″E
- Country: Iran
- Province: Isfahan
- County: Golpayegan
- District: Central
- Rural District: Nivan

Population (2016)
  - Total: 101
- Time zone: UTC+3:30 (IRST)

Shurcheh (Persian: شورچه) (Note: Also romanized as Shūrcheh; also known as Shoocheh) is a village in Nivan Rural District of the Central District in Golpayegan County, Isfahan province, Iran.

== Demographics ==
=== Population ===
At the time of the 2006 National Census, the village's population was 148 in 46 households. The following census in 2011 counted 144 people in 50 households. The 2016 census measured the population of the village as 101 people in 38 households.
