= Farajabad, Isfahan =

Village in Isfahan province, Iran

Farajabad Persian: فرج اباد
- Village
- Location within Iran
- Coordinates: 33°32′45″N 50°19′30″E
- Country: Iran
- Province: Isfahan
- County: Golpayegan
- District: Central
- Rural District: Kenarrudkhaneh

Population (2016)
  - Total: 253
- Time zone: UTC+3:30 (IRST)

Farajabad (Persian: فرج اباد) (Note: Also romanized as Farajābād) is a village in Kenarrudkhaneh Rural District of the Central District of Golpayegan County, Isfahan province, Iran.

== Demographics ==
=== Population ===
At the time of the 2006 National Census, the village's population was 235 in 67 households. The following census in 2011 counted 286 people in 90 households. The 2016 census measured the population of the village as 253 people in 80 households.
