= Malazjan =

Village in Isfahan province, Iran

Malazjan Persian: ملازجان
- Village
- Location within Iran
- Coordinates: 33°31′45″N 50°20′58″E
- Country: Iran
- Province: Isfahan
- County: Golpayegan
- District: Central
- Rural District: Kenarrudkhaneh

Population (2016)
  - Total: 155
- Time zone: UTC+3:30 (IRST)

Malazjan (Persian: ملازجان) (Note: Also romanized as Malāzjān, Melāzjān, and Molāzjān) is a village in Kenarrudkhaneh Rural District of the Central District of Golpayegan County, Isfahan province, Iran.

== Demographics ==
=== Population ===
At the time of the 2006 National Census, the village's population was 276 in 91 households. The following census in 2011 counted 243 people in 87 households. The 2016 census measured the population of the village as 155 people in 66 households.
