= Estahlak =

Estahlak (Persian: استهلك) may refer to:

- Estahlak, Isfahan
- Estahlak, Markazi
