= Robat-e Sorkh-e Olya =

Village in Isfahan province, Iran

Robat-e Sorkh-e Olya Persian: رباط سرخ عليا
- Village
- Location within Iran
- Coordinates: 33°30′39″N 50°18′05″E
- Country: Iran
- Province: Isfahan
- County: Golpayegan
- District: Central
- Rural District: Kenarrudkhaneh

Population (2016)
  - Total: 1,910
- Time zone: UTC+3:30 (IRST)

Robat-e Sorkh-e Olya (Persian: رباط سرخ عليا) (Note: Also romanized as Robāţ-e Sorkh-e ‘Olyā; also known as Robāţ-e Sorkh) is a village in Kenarrudkhaneh Rural District of the Central District of Golpayegan County, Isfahan province, Iran.

== Demographics ==
=== Population ===
At the time of the 2006 National Census, the village's population was 1,519 in 397 households. The following census in 2011 counted 2,015 people in 576 households. The 2016 census measured the population of the village as 1,910 people in 606 households, the most populous in its rural district.
