= Dastjerdeh, Isfahan =

Village in Isfahan province, Iran

Dastjerdeh Persian: دستجرده
- Village
- Location within Iran
- Coordinates: 33°31′05″N 50°22′06″E
- Country: Iran
- Province: Isfahan
- County: Golpayegan
- District: Central
- Rural District: Jolgeh

Population (2016)
  - Total: 204
- Time zone: UTC+3:30 (IRST)

Dastjerdeh (Persian: دستجرده) is a village in Jolgeh Rural District of the Central District in Golpayegan County, Isfahan province, Iran.

== Demographics ==
=== Population ===
At the time of the 2006 National Census, the village's population was 276 in 90 households. The following census in 2011 counted 211 people in 84 households. The 2016 census measured the population of the village as 204 people in 93 households.
