= Zamenabad, Isfahan =

Zamenabad ضامن اباد
- Village
- Location within Iran
- Coordinates: 33°30′48″N 50°20′07″E
- Country: Iran
- Province: Isfahan
- County: Golpayegan
- Bakhsh: Central
- Rural District: Kenarrudkhaneh

Population (2006)
  - Total: 165
- Time zone: UTC+3:30 (IRST)
  - Summer (DST): UTC+4:30 (IRDT)

Zamenabad (Persian: ضامن اباد, also Romanized as Ẕāmenābād) is a village in Kenarrudkhaneh Rural District, in the Central District of Golpayegan County, Isfahan Province, Iran. At the 2006 census, its population was 165, in 53 families.
