= Favian =

Village in Isfahan province, Iran

Favian Persian: فاويان
- Village
- Location within Iran
- Coordinates: 33°32′27″N 50°23′54″E
- Country: Iran
- Province: Isfahan
- County: Golpayegan
- District: Central
- Rural District: Jolgeh

Population (2016)
  - Total: 453
- Time zone: UTC+3:30 (IRST)

Favian (Persian: فاويان) (Note: Also romanized as Fāveyān, Fāvīān, and Fāvīyān) is a village in Jolgeh Rural District of the Central District in Golpayegan County, Isfahan province, Iran.

== Demographics ==
=== Population ===
At the time of the 2006 National Census, the village's population was 492 in 165 households. The following census in 2011 counted 456 people in 150 households. The 2016 census measured the population of the village as 453 people in 185 households, the most populous in its rural district.
