= Zamenabad =

Zamenabad (Persian: ضامن آباد) may refer to:

- Zamenabad, Isfahan
- Zamenabad, Kurdistan
