= Shadegan, Isfahan =

Village in Isfahan province, Iran

Shadegan Persian: شادگان
- Village
- Location within Iran
- Coordinates: 33°31′32″N 50°24′54″E
- Country: Iran
- Province: Isfahan
- County: Golpayegan
- District: Central
- Rural District: Jolgeh

Population (2016)
  - Total: 337
- Time zone: UTC+3:30 (IRST)

Shadegan (Persian: شادگان) (Note: Also romanized as Shādegān, Shadgan, and Shādgān; also known as Kharafghan, Kharfaqān, and Khartaqān) is a village in Jolgeh Rural District of the Central District in Golpayegan County, Isfahan province, Iran.

== Demographics ==
=== Population ===
At the time of the 2006 National Census, the village's population was 406 in 145 households. The following census in 2011 counted 370 people in 132 households. The 2016 census measured the population of the village as 337 people in 137 households.
