= Robat-e Abu ol Qasem =

Village in Isfahan province, Iran

Robat-e Abu ol Qasem Persian: رباط ابوالقاسم
- Village
- Location within Iran
- Coordinates: 33°31′04″N 50°20′32″E
- Country: Iran
- Province: Isfahan
- County: Golpayegan
- District: Central
- Rural District: Kenarrudkhaneh

Population (2016)
  - Total: 159
- Time zone: UTC+3:30 (IRST)

Robat-e Abu ol Qasem (Persian: رباط ابوالقاسم) (Note: Also romanized as Robāţ-e Abū ol Qāsem) is a village in Kenarrudkhaneh Rural District of the Central District of Golpayegan County, Isfahan province, Iran.

== Demographics ==
=== Population ===
At the time of the 2006 National Census, the village's population was 144 in 44 households. The following census in 2011 counted 117 people in 43 households. The 2016 census measured the population of the village as 159 people in 59 households.
