= Koluchan =

Koluchan or Koloochan or Kaluchan or Kaloochan or Keluchan (Persian: كلوچان) may refer to:

- Koluchan, Bandar Abbas, Hormozgan Province
- Koluchan, Isfahan
