= Qaleqan =

Village in Isfahan province, Iran

Qaleqan Persian: قالقان
- Village
- Location within Iran
- Coordinates: 33°31′01″N 50°21′20″E
- Country: Iran
- Province: Isfahan
- County: Golpayegan
- District: Central
- Rural District: Kenarrudkhaneh

Population (2016)
  - Total: 168
- Time zone: UTC+3:30 (IRST)

Qaleqan (Persian: قالقان) (Note: Also romanized as Qāleqān and Qālqān; also known as Ghaleghan) is a village in Kenarrudkhaneh Rural District of the Central District of Golpayegan County, Isfahan province, Iran.

== Demographics ==
=== Population ===
At the time of the 2006 National Census, the village's population was 200 in 67 households. The following census in 2011 counted 185 people in 69 households. The 2016 census measured the population of the village as 168 people in 65 households.
