= Zaranjan =

Village in Isfahan province, Iran

Zaranjan Persian: زرنجان
- Village
- Location within Iran
- Coordinates: 33°29′08″N 50°24′11″E
- Country: Iran
- Province: Isfahan
- County: Golpayegan
- District: Central
- Rural District: Nivan

Population (2016)
  - Total: 970
- Time zone: UTC+3:30 (IRST)

Zaranjan (Persian: زرنجان) (Note: Also romanized as Zaranjān and Zarenjān; also known as Aranjān, Zarengān, Zarinjān, and Zenjān) is a village in Nivan Rural District of the Central District in Golpayegan County, Isfahan province, Iran.

== History ==
In 1995, the villages of Bala Darreh (بالا دره), Balaband (بالابند), and Zaranjan were merged to form the larger village of Zaranjan.

== Demographics ==
=== Population ===
At the time of the 2006 National Census, the village's population was 914 in 249 households. The following census in 2011 counted 882 people in 278 households. The 2016 census measured the population of the village as 970 people in 332 households.
