= Gouged Stronghold =

Castle in Iran

Gouged stronghold
- Gouged, Iran
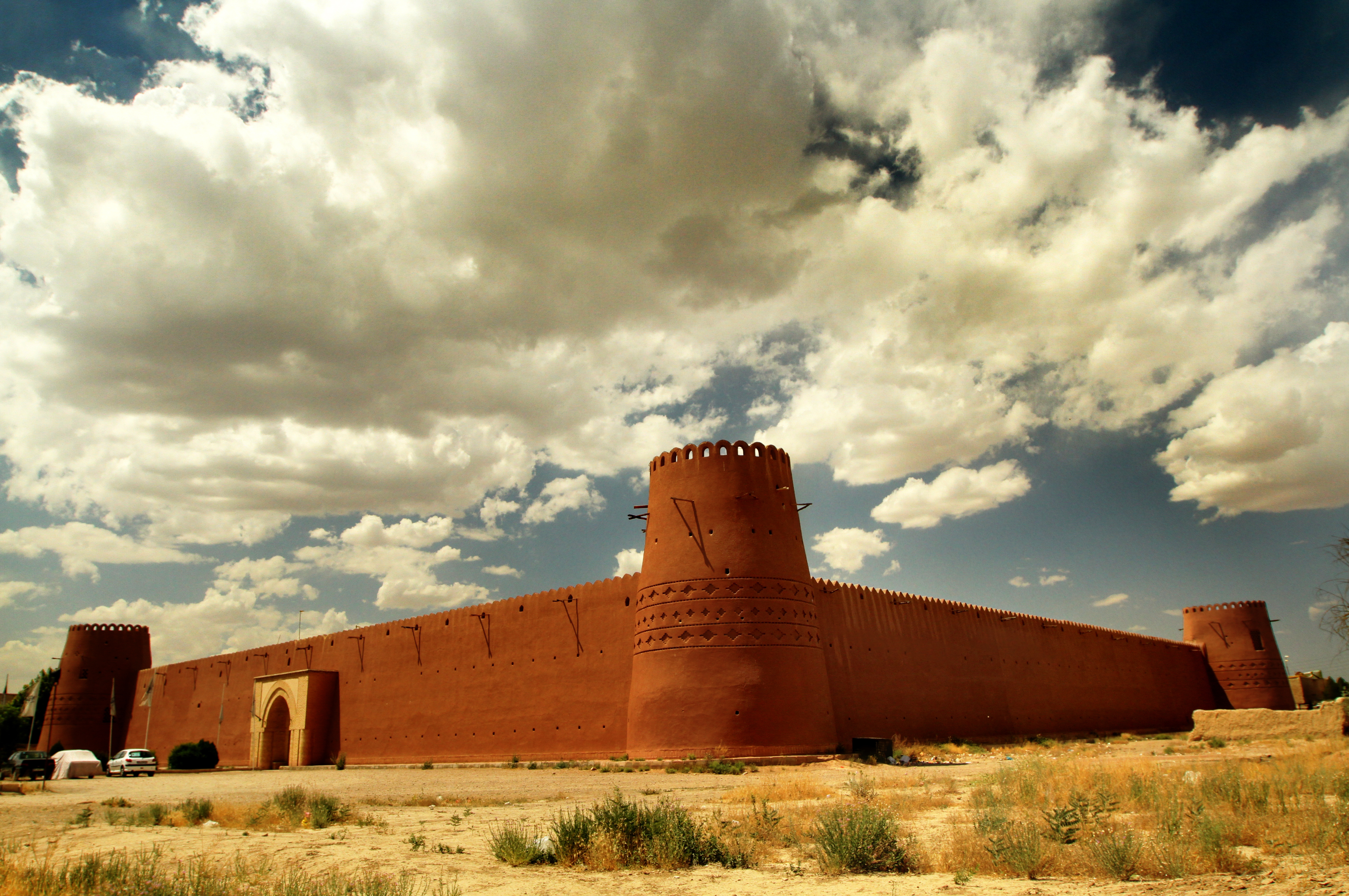

Site information
- Type: fortification

Location
- Coordinates: 33.469584°N 50.342692°E

Site history
- Built: 16th century
- Materials: mud and adobe

The Gouged stronghold (Persian: ارگ گوگد) is located in the city of Gouged, Golpayegan county, Iran. Gouged is located 5 km to the north of Golpayegan. In peacetime, the stronghold was used as a caravansary, but during war time or when bandits attacked, it was used as a castle. This structure is located in the Golpayegani alley and Ghale alley. At present, the stronghold is used as a traditional three star hotel.

The Gouged stronghold is one of the biggest adobe and mud structures in Iran. It was built approximately 400 years ago. The only document related to this structure dates back to 140 years ago. By this document, Ali Khan Bakhtiari gave half of the stronghold to his wife as mahr.

== See also ==
- List of historical structures in Isfahan province

== Gallery ==
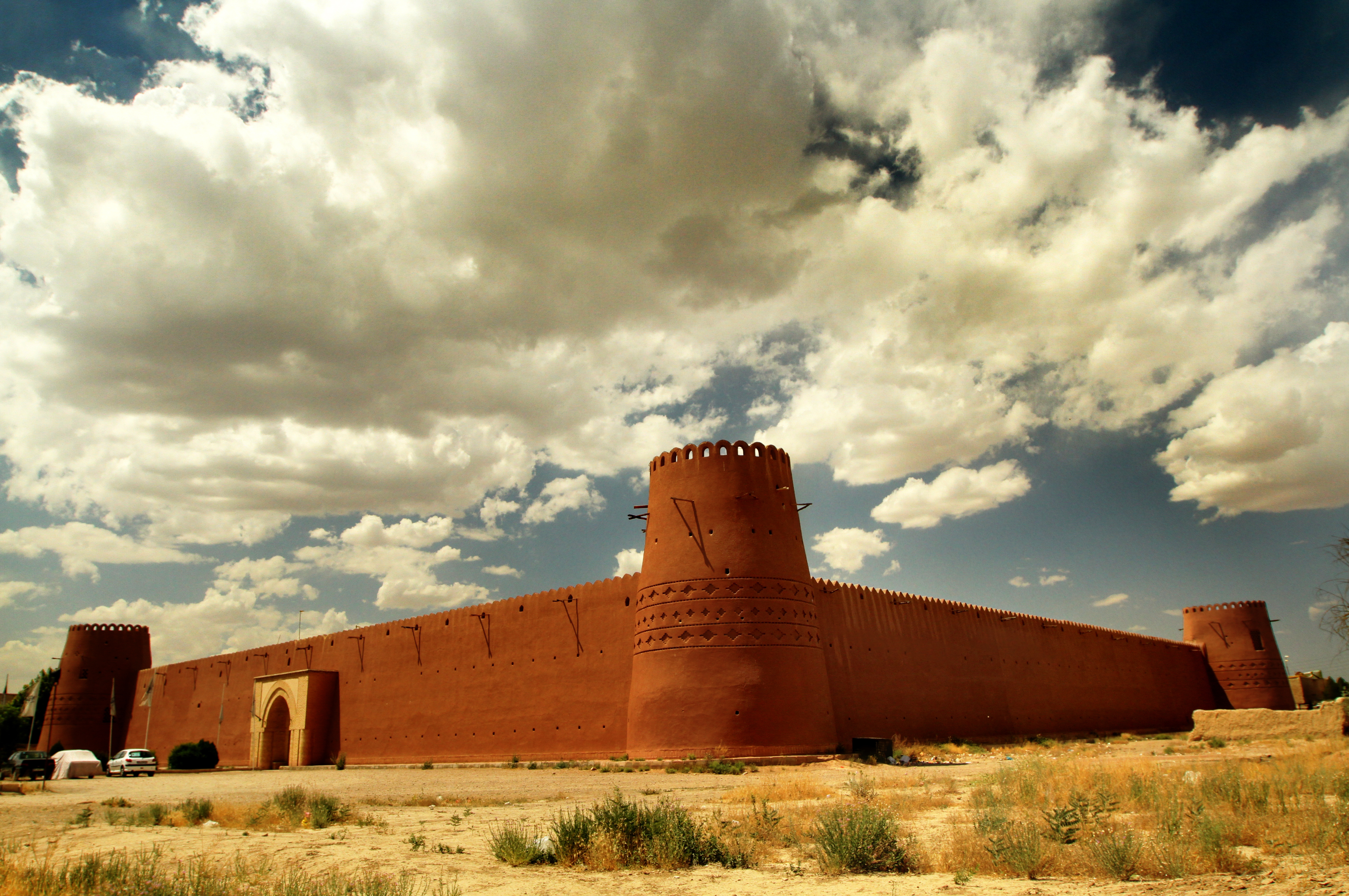
Arg-e Googad (Gouged Stronghold), Golpayegan, Isfahan Province, Iran

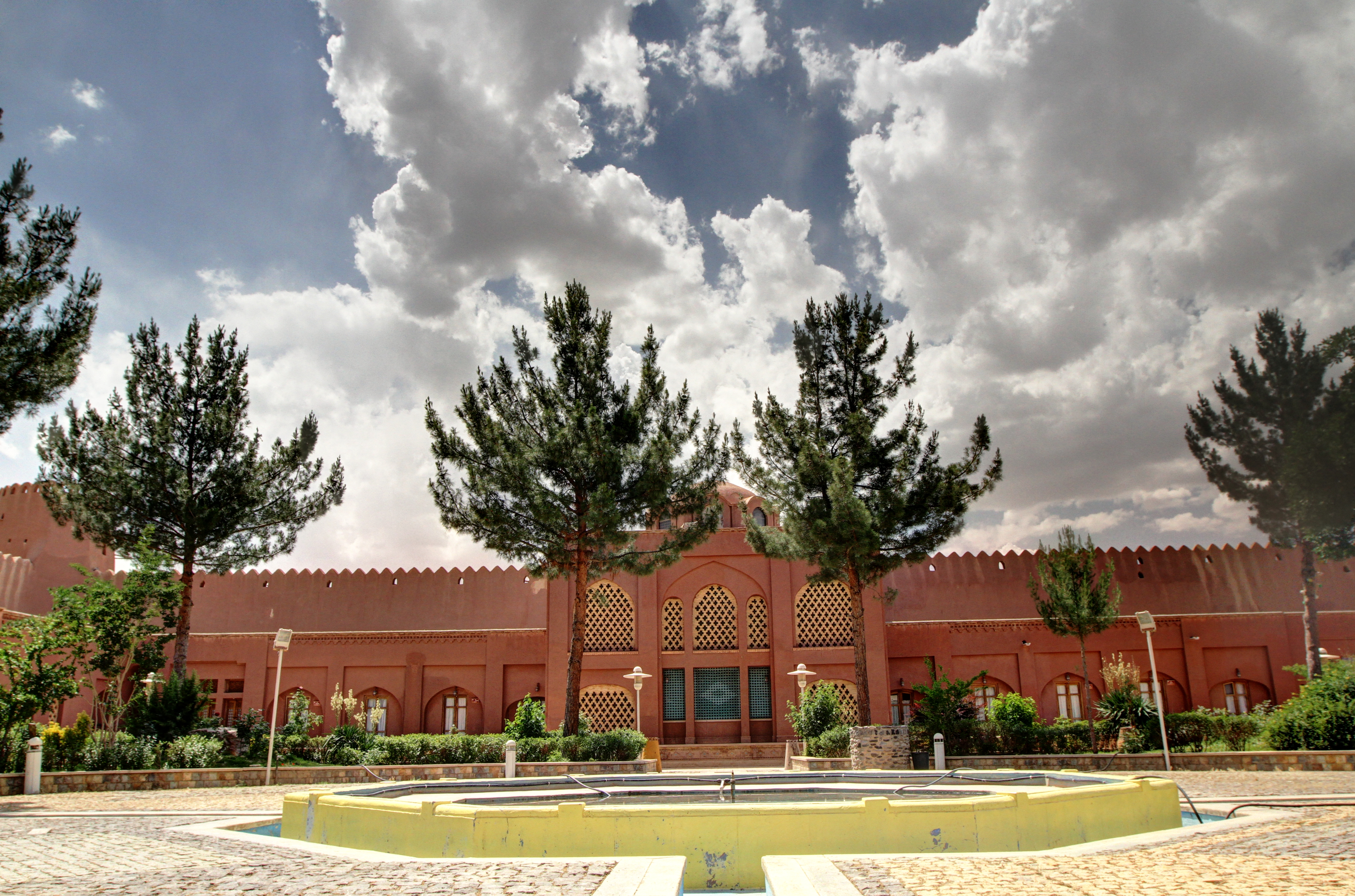
Arg-e Googad (Gouged Stronghold), Golpayegan, Isfahan Province, Iran

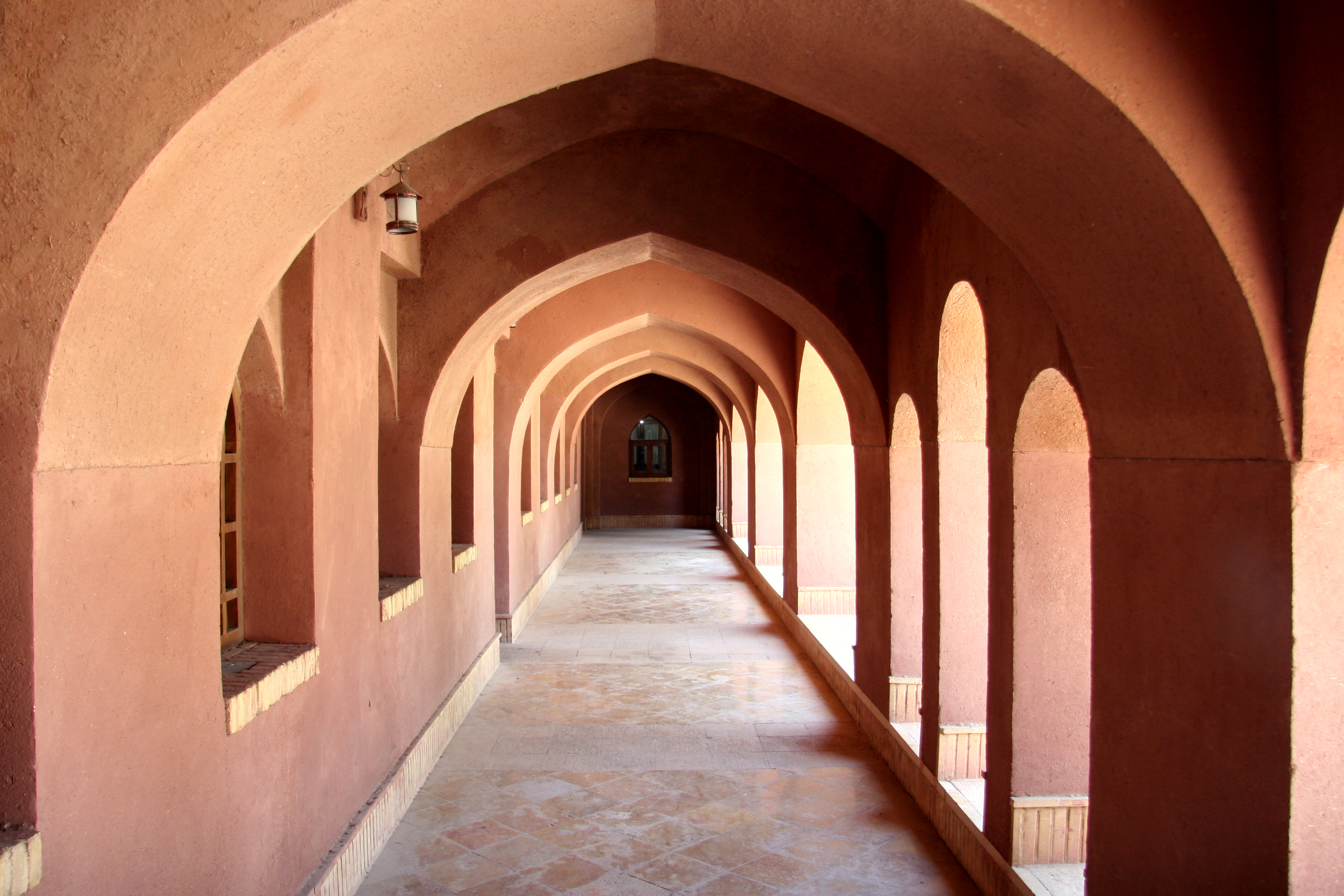
Arg-e Googad (Gouged Stronghold), Golpayegan, Isfahan Province, Iran

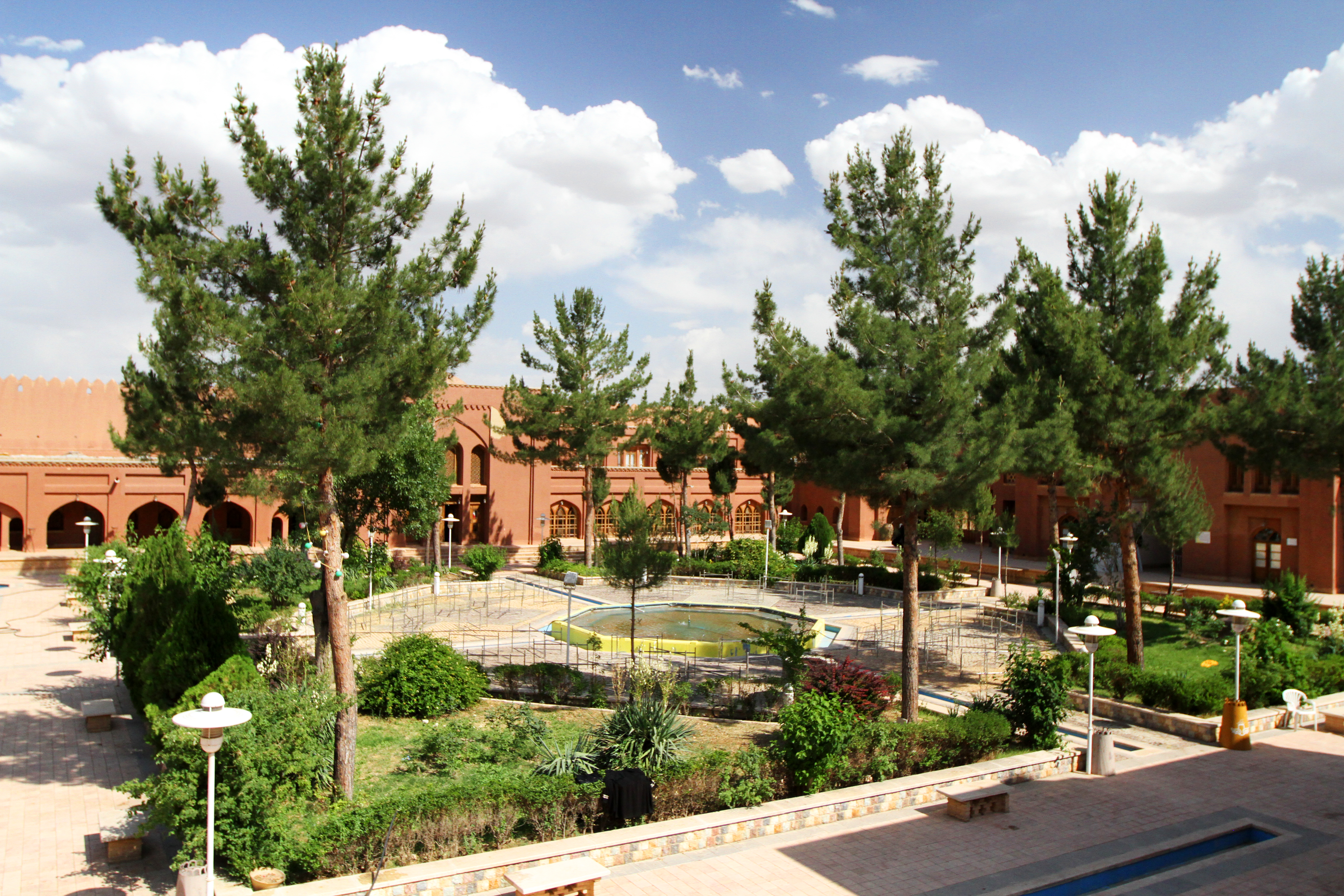
Arg-e Googad (Gouged Stronghold), Golpayegan, Isfahan Province, Iran

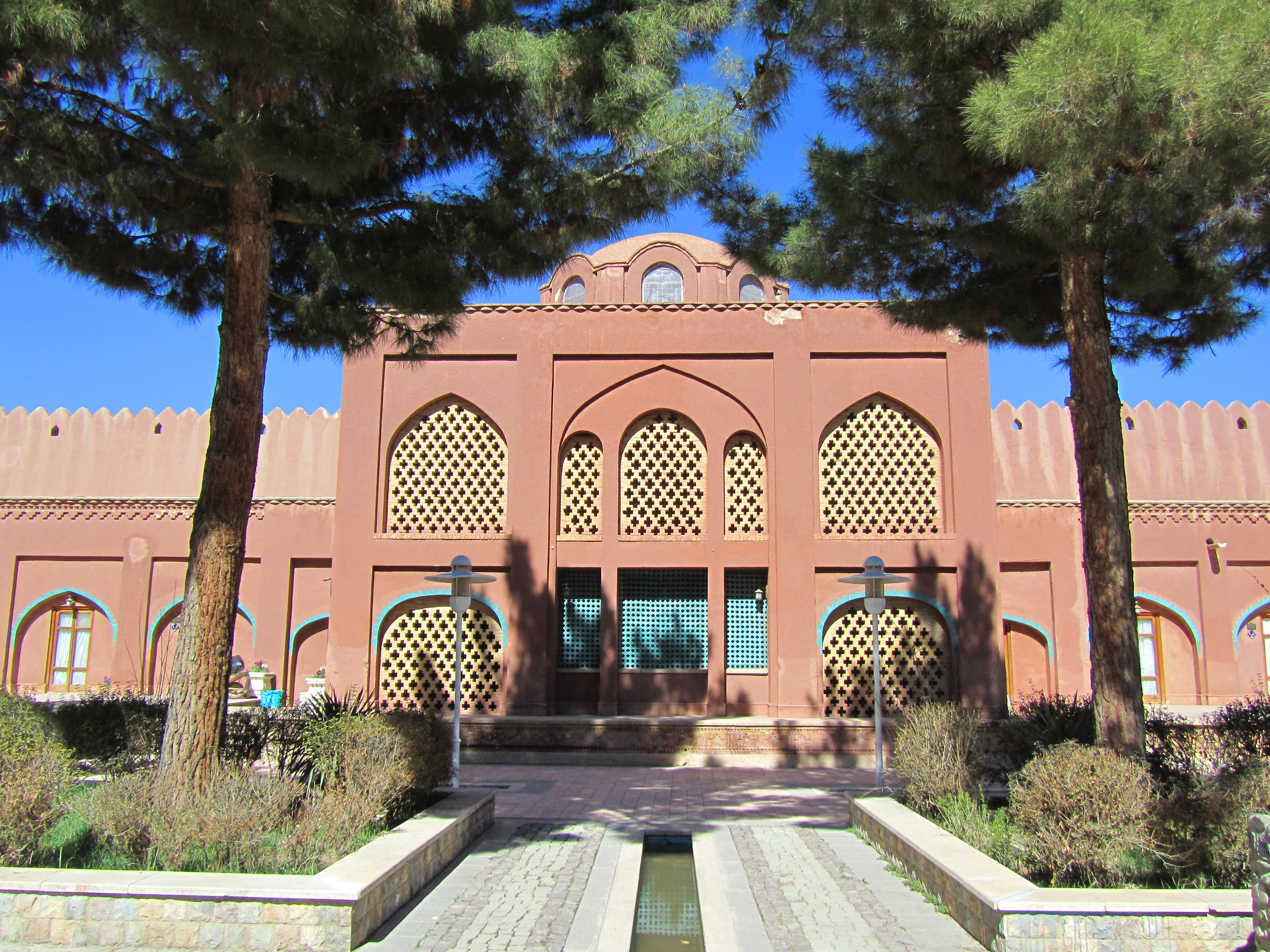
Arg-e Googad (Gouged Stronghold), Golpayegan, Isfahan Province, Iran

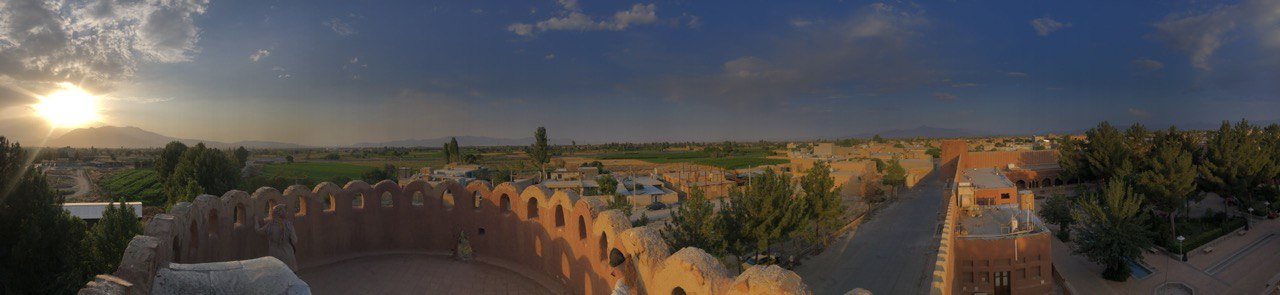
View from Arg-e Googad (Gouged Stronghold), Golpayegan, Isfahan Province, Iran
