= Darb-e Emamzadeh Ebrahim =

Village in Isfahan province, Iran

Darb-e Emamzadeh Ebrahim Persian: درب امامزاده ابراهيم
- Village
- Location within Iran
- Country: Iran
- Province: Isfahan
- County: Golpayegan
- District: Central
- Rural District: Kenarrudkhaneh

Population (2016)
  - Total: 728
- Time zone: UTC+3:30 (IRST)

Darb-e Emamzadeh Ebrahim (Persian: درب امامزاده ابراهيم) (Note: Also romanized as Darb-e Emāmzādeh Ebrāhīm; also known as Darb-e Emāmzādeh) is a village in Kenarrudkhaneh Rural District of the Central District of Golpayegan County, Isfahan province, Iran.

== Demographics ==
=== Population ===
At the time of the 2006 National Census, the village's population was 684 in 200 households. The following census in 2011 counted 678 people in 225 households. The 2016 census measured the population of the village as 728 people in 251 households.
