= Robat-e Maleki =

Village in Isfahan province, Iran

Robat-e Maleki Persian: رباط ملکي
- Village
- Location within Iran
- Coordinates: 33°29′37″N 50°22′02″E
- Country: Iran
- Province: Isfahan
- County: Golpayegan
- District: Central
- Rural District: Jolgeh

Population (2016)
  - Total: 284
- Time zone: UTC+3:30 (IRST)

Robat-e Maleki (Persian: رباط ملکي) (Note: Also romanized as Robat Maleki, Robāţ-e Malakī, and Robāţ-e Malekī; formerly known as Robat-e Malek (رباط ملك), also romanized as Robāţ-e Malek) is a village in Jolgeh Rural District of the Central District in Golpayegan County, Isfahan province, Iran.

== Demographics ==
=== Population ===
At the time of the 2006 National Census, the village's population, as Robat-e Malek, was 352 in 112 households. The following census in 2011 counted 315 people in 109 households, by which time the village was listed as Robat-e Maleki. The 2016 census measured the population of the village as 284 people in 107 households.
