= Vaneshan =

Village in Isfahan province, Iran

Vaneshan Persian: وانشان
- Village
- Location within Iran
- Coordinates: 33°21′07″N 50°21′18″E
- Country: Iran
- Province: Isfahan
- County: Golpayegan
- District: Central
- Rural District: Nivan

Population (2016)
  - Total: 406
- Time zone: UTC+3:30 (IRST)

Vaneshan (Persian: وانشان) (Note: Also romanized as Vāneshān and Vānshān; also known as Barmshān and Vanishan) is a village in Nivan Rural District of the Central District in Golpayegan County, Isfahan province, Iran.

== Demographics ==
=== Population ===
At the time of the 2006 National Census, the village's population was 624 in 233 households. The following census in 2011 counted 495 people in 204 households. The 2016 census measured the population of the village as 406 people in 175 households.
