= Faqestan =

Village in Isfahan province, Iran

Faqestan Persian: فقستان
- Village
- Location within Iran
- Coordinates: 33°31′50″N 50°20′07″E
- Country: Iran
- Province: Isfahan
- County: Golpayegan
- District: Central
- Rural District: Kenarrudkhaneh

Population (2016)
  - Total: 155
- Time zone: UTC+3:30 (IRST)

Faqestan (Persian: فقستان) (Note: Also romanized as Faqestān and Fāqestān) is a village in Kenarrudkhaneh Rural District of the Central District of Golpayegan County, Isfahan province, Iran.

== Demographics ==
=== Population ===
At the time of the 2006 National Census, the village's population was 232 in 77 households. The following census in 2011 counted 221 people in 80 households. The 2016 census measured the population of the village as 155 people in 61 households.
