= Esfaranjan, Isfahan =

Village in Isfahan province, Iran

Esfaranjan Persian: اسفرنجان
- Village
- Location within Iran
- Coordinates: 33°29′42″N 50°21′18″E
- Country: Iran
- Province: Isfahan
- County: Golpayegan
- District: Central
- Rural District: Jolgeh

Population (2016)
  - Total: 416
- Time zone: UTC+3:30 (IRST)

Esfaranjan (Persian: اسفرنجان) (Note: Also romanized as Asfaranjān, Esfarenjān, and Isfaranjān; also known as Esfarjān) is a village in Jolgeh Rural District of the Central District in Golpayegan County, Isfahan province, Iran.

== Demographics ==
=== Population ===
At the time of the 2006 National Census, the village's population was 551 in 164 households. The following census in 2011 counted 518 people in 170 households. The 2016 census measured the population of the village as 416 people in 159 households.
