= Dizjan =

Dizjan or Dizejan (Persian: ديزجان) may refer to:

- Dizjan, Golpayegan, Isfahan Province
- Dizjan, Semirom, Isfahan Province
- Dizjan, Qom
