= Jameh Mosque of Golpayegan =

Mosque in Golpayegan, Isfahan province, Iran

Jāmeh Mosque of Golpayegan
- مسجد جامع گلپایگان
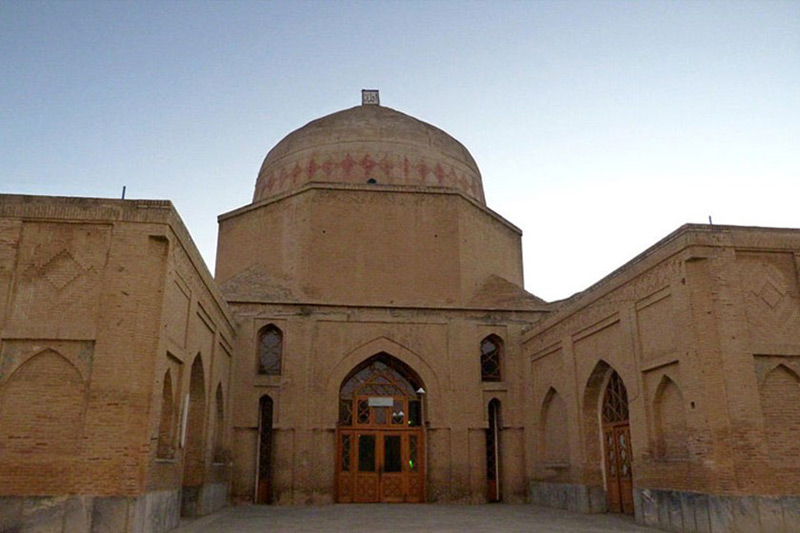
- The mosque in 2019

- Location of the mosque in Iran

Religion
- Affiliation: Shia Islam
- Ecclesiastical or organisational status: Friday mosque
- Status: Active

Location
- Location: Kashan, Golpayegan, Isfahan province
- Country: Iran
- Coordinates: 33°27′16″N 50°17′37″E

Architecture
- Architect: Abou Omar ebn-e Mohammad Qazvini
- Type: Mosque architecture
- Style: Razi; Seljuk; Qajar
- Completed: 1114 CE

Specifications
- Dome: One
- Dome height (outer): 22 m (72 ft)
- Materials: Stone; bricks; mortar

Iran National Heritage List
- Official name: Friday Mosque of Golpayegan
- Type: Friday Mosque
- Designated: 1933
- Reference no.: 191
- Conservation organization: Cultural Heritage, Handicrafts and Tourism Organization of Iran

The Jāmeh Mosque of Golpayegan (Persian: مسجد جامع گلپایگان, romanized: Masjid-i Jami' (Gulpayagan)) is a Friday mosque (jāmeh), located on Masjed Jameh street in Golpayegan, in the province of Isfahan, Iran.

The mosque was added to the Iran National Heritage List on 31 July 1933, administered by the Cultural Heritage, Handicrafts and Tourism Organization of Iran.

== Architecture ==
=== Influence on Iranian Islamic architectural style ===
The Jameh Mosque of Golpayegan was built in 1114 CE, during the reign of the Seljuk Sultan, Abou Shoja Muhammad I, by order of Abou Nasr Ebrahim ebn-e Mohammad ebn-e Ebrahim Baba Abd ol-Malek. It is one of the important mosques of the Seljuk era and one of the large mosques in Iran. In view of its construction date, it may be said that its Iranian Islamic architecture was a model for building other large mosques, especially the mosques, which were in the territory of the Seljuk Empire. Only the dome chamber remains from the Seljuk period mosque, integrated into a monumental four-iwan mosque during the Qajar period. Like other Seljuk buildings, its shabestan has no tile decoration. This mosque has a large courtyard and shabestan and a large brick dome.

André Godard listed the Golpayegan Mosque as an example of a "kiosk-mosque", which he considered to be the continuation of Sasanian temple typology under Islam. Consisting only of a chahar taq style dome chamber and a free-standing minaret, this type of mosque would accommodate praying crowds in a walled sahn around the sanctuary. Bernard O'Kane rejected this hypothesis and argued for the prevalence of central Islamic plan types in early Iranian mosques, where a roofed hypostyle hall with wooden columns would surround the dome chamber. The latter hypothesis may be considered to hold given Ghulam Ali Hatim's reference to Seljuk columns recently unearthed at the northeast side of the courtyard while excavating for a new addition.

=== Features ===
Built in the nineteenth century, the Qajar period mosque is roughly rectangular in plan and consists of vaulted and domed prayer halls enveloping the four sides of a rectangular sahn. It is oriented northeast-southwest and measures approximately 73 by 44 metres (240 by 144 ft). The 26-by-32-metre (85 by 105 ft) sahn is symmetrically arranged with two grand square iwans to the northeast and southwest, and two small iwans to the northwest and southeast. The main portal opens into the northeast iwan, while secondary portals lead into the sahn through the northwest and southeast iwans. The grand southwestern iwan is sheltered by a dome and leads directly into the equally large sanctuary, which has a mihrab niche on its qibla wall.

The square sanctuary is constructed entirely of brick and is opened on three sides with vaulted archways flanked by embedded columns. The east and north corners of the chamber have thick double columns marking the corner, flanked by narrow archways cut into the adjoining walls that are topped by arched windows. Only a single such archway exists at the western corner and there are none at the southern corner. Above, the transition to the shallow brick dome is achieved with muqarnas squinches built into the corners of the tall octagonal drum. Light comes in through four honeycomb windows pierced into the dome's base, which is ringed with a band of Kufic inscriptions.

Centered on the qibla wall, the three-sided mihrab niche of the Seljuk dome chamber has a stucco muqarnas hood, topped by a blind arch carved with inscriptions, and an inscriptive plaque. Three bands of Kufic inscriptions separated with bands of geometric motifs border the mihrab. A shallow niche with a cusped arch forms a smaller mihrab to the left of the main niche and is marked with a Kufic inscriptive plaque and frame of Kufic inscriptions. The place of the minbar to the right of the main mihrab is occupied by an unmarked niche with a cusped arch. The interior surfaces are adorned with brick panels with intricate geometric motifs and geometric compositions of God's name in Kufic letters and have traces of tiles that were used to highlight the patterns. The exterior of the dome structure is left plain, with the exception of a ring of large diamonds encircling the dome's base.

The single minaret is located outside the precinct, behind the qibla wall and also dates from the Seljuk period. Its octagonal base is joined by a tall cylindrical shaft, which is topped by a narrow turret placed off-center. The base is carved with shallow niches on each side. Simple brick patterns adorn the shaft, which displays remnants of turquoise tiles at the top.

== See also ==
- Shia Islam in Iran
- List of mosques in Iran
- List of historical structures in Isfahan province
