= Asfaranjan =

Asfaranjan or Esfaranjan (Persian: اسفرنجان) may refer to:

- Asfaranjan, Ardabil
- Esfaranjan, Isfahan
- Esfaranjan, Shahreza, Isfahan Province
