= Nivan-e Suq =

Village in Isfahan province, Iran

Nivan-e Suq Persian: نيوان سوق
- Village
- Location within Iran
- Coordinates: 33°27′56″N 50°22′11″E
- Country: Iran
- Province: Isfahan
- County: Golpayegan
- District: Central
- Rural District: Nivan

Population (2016)
  - Total: 915
- Time zone: UTC+3:30 (IRST)

Nivan-e Suq (Persian: نيوان سوق) (Note: Also romanized as Nīvān Sūq and Nīvān-e Sūq; also known as Nīvān, Nivan Soogh, Nivūn, and Niwān) is a village in Nivan Rural District of the Central District in Golpayegan County, Isfahan province, Iran.

== Demographics ==
=== Population ===
At the time of the 2006 National Census, the village's population was 1,047 in 338 households. The following census in 2011 counted 1,043 people in 367 households. The 2016 census measured the population of the village as 915 people in 338 households.
