= Koluchan, Isfahan =

Village in Isfahan province, Iran

Koluchan Persian: كلوچان
- Village
- Location within Iran
- Coordinates: 33°30′13″N 50°21′50″E
- Country: Iran
- Province: Isfahan
- County: Golpayegan
- District: Central
- Rural District: Jolgeh

Population (2016)
  - Total: 273
- Time zone: UTC+3:30 (IRST)

Koluchan (Persian: كلوچان) (Note: Also romanized as Kaloochan, Kalūchān, Kelūchān, and Kolūchān) is a village in Jolgeh Rural District of the Central District in Golpayegan County, Isfahan province, Iran.

== Demographics ==
=== Population ===
At the time of the 2006 National Census, the village's population was 368 in 125 households. The following census in 2011 counted 337 people in 118 households. The 2016 census measured the population of the village as 273 people in 111 households.
