= Nivan-e Nar =

Village in Isfahan province, Iran

Nivan-e Nar Persian: نيوان نار
- Village
- Location within Iran
- Coordinates: 33°27′28″N 50°22′49″E
- Country: Iran
- Province: Isfahan
- County: Golpayegan
- District: Central
- Rural District: Nivan

Population (2016)
  - Total: 1,010
- Time zone: UTC+3:30 (IRST)

Nivan-e Nar (Persian: نيوان نار) (Note: Also romanized as Nīvān Nār and Nīvān-e Nār; also known as Nīvān Tār) is a village in, and the capital of, Nivan Rural District in the Central District of Golpayegan County, Isfahan province, Iran.

== Demographics ==
=== Population ===
At the time of the 2006 National Census, the village's population was 1,145 in 347 households. The following census in 2011 counted 1,163 people in 386 households. The 2016 census measured the population of the village as 1,010 people in 367 households, the most populous in its rural district.
