= Golpayegan University of Engineering =

Coordinates: 33°28′54″N 50°16′27″E

Golpayegan College of Engineering
- دانشکده فنی و مهندسی گلپايگان; Dāneshkadeh Fanny va Mohandesi Golpayegan
- Former names: Golpayegan Faculty of Engineering and Technology
- Type: Public
- Established: 2000
- Parent institution: Isfahan University of Technology
- Affiliations: FUIW
- Students: 1200
- Undergraduates: 1020
- Postgraduates: 180
- Location: Golpayegan, Iran
- Campus: Urban
- Website: gc.iut.ac.ir/fa/

Golpayegan college of Engineering

The Golpayegan College of Engineering (Persian: دانشکده فنی و مهندسی گلپايگان; formerly as Golpayegan Faculty of Engineering and Technology) is a small faculty of engineering with limited branches in some fields of engineering and only in undergraduate and graduate level in Golpayegan, Isfahan province, Iran.

In the first academic year, 2000 – 2001, 50 students have been admitted in 2 majors including Mechanical Engineering and Industrial Engineering. The university places emphasis on introducing students to actual working experiences through projects with local industrial companies. Since its foundation some new majors are added to the university's program. Several new majors are being developed including chemistry, civil engineering and mechatronics (combined disciplines of mechanical and electronic). It is expected these new majors will attract more than 1500 students.
