= Qorghan =

Village in Isfahan province, Iran

Qorghan Persian: قرغن
- Village
- Location within Iran
- Coordinates: 33°26′32″N 50°03′37″E
- Country: Iran
- Province: Isfahan
- County: Golpayegan
- District: Central
- Rural District: Kenarrudkhaneh

Population (2016)
  - Total: 159
- Time zone: UTC+3:30 (IRST)

Qorghan (Persian: قرغن) (Note: Also romanized as Qarghan; also known as Gharghan, Qūrghan, and Qūrqan) is a village in Kenarrudkhaneh Rural District of the Central District of Golpayegan County, Isfahan province, Iran.

== Demographics ==
=== Population ===
At the time of the 2006 National Census, the village's population was 228 in 73 households. The following census in 2011 counted 191 people in 66 households. The 2016 census measured the population of the village as 159 people in 56 households.
