= Jolgeh Rural District (Golpayegan County) =

Rural district in Isfahan province, Iran

Jolgeh Rural District Persian: دهستان جلگه
- Rural District
- Location within Iran
- Coordinates: 33°32′32″N 50°28′00″E
- Country: Iran
- Province: Isfahan
- County: Golpayegan
- District: Central
- Established: 1987
- Capital: Golshahr

Population (2016)
  - Total: 3,344
- Time zone: UTC+3:30 (IRST)

Jolgeh Rural District (Persian: دهستان جلگه) is in the Central District of Golpayegan County, Isfahan province, Iran. It is administered from the city of Golshahr. (Note: Formerly Konjadabad or Konjadjan)

== Demographics ==
=== Population ===
At the time of the 2006 National Census, the rural district's population was 4,021 in 1,300 households. There were 3,593 inhabitants in 1,230 households at the following census of 2011. The 2016 census measured the population of the rural district as 3,344 in 1,307 households. The most populous of its 20 villages was Favian, with 453 people.

=== Other villages in the rural district ===
- Arjan
- Dastjerdeh
- Dom-e Asman
- Esfaranjan
- Koluchan
- Robat-e Maleki
- Sar Avar
- Shadegan
- Sheydabad
- Varnian
