= Golshahr =

City in Isfahan province, Iran

Golshahr Persian: گلشهر
- City
- Location within Iran
- Coordinates: 33°30′19″N 50°27′44″E
- Country: Iran
- Province: Isfahan
- County: Golpayegan
- District: Central
- Established as a city: 2001

Population (2016)
  - Total: 9,904
- Time zone: UTC+3:30 (IRST)

Golshahr (Persian: گلشهر) (Note: Also romanized as Gol Shahr; formerly Konjadjan (کنجدجان)) is a city in the Central District of Golpayegan County, Isfahan province, Iran, serving as the administrative center for Jolgeh Rural District.

== History ==
In 2001, the village of Konjadjan (کنجدجان), after merging with the villages of Filakhs (فیلاخص), Varzaneh (ورزنه), and Vodagh (وداغ), was converted to a city and renamed Golshahr.

== Demographics ==
=== Population ===
At the time of the 2006 National Census, the city's population was 9,966 in 2,865 households. The following census in 2011 counted 9,903 people in 3,173 households. The 2016 census measured the population of the city as 9,904 people in 3,291 households.
