= Estahlak, Markazi =

Estahlak استهلک
- Village
- Location within Iran
- Coordinates: 33°43′02″N 49°48′29″E
- Country: Iran
- Province: Markazi
- County: Khomeyn
- Bakhsh: Kamareh
- Rural District: Khorram Dasht

Population (2006)
  - Total: 41
- Time zone: UTC+3:30 (IRST)
  - Summer (DST): UTC+4:30 (IRDT)

Estahlak (Persian: استهلک, also Romanized as Estahlak; also known as Astalak and Eştalak) is a village in Khorram Dasht Rural District, Kamareh District, Khomeyn County, Markazi Province, Iran. At the 2006 census, its population was 41, in 9 families.
