= Koluchan, Bandar Abbas =

Koluchan كلوچان
- Village
- Location within Iran
- Coordinates: 27°41′21″N 56°33′34″E
- Country: Iran
- Province: Hormozgan
- County: Bandar Abbas
- Bakhsh: Central
- Rural District: Isin

Population (2006)
  - Total: 215
- Time zone: UTC+3:30 (IRST)
  - Summer (DST): UTC+4:30 (IRDT)

Koluchan (Persian: كلوچان, also Romanized as Kolūchān; also known as Galūchān) is a village in Isin Rural District, in the Central District of Bandar Abbas County, Hormozgan Province, Iran. At the 2006 census, its population was 215, in 55 families.
