= Qurghan, Iran =

Qurghan قورغان
- Village
- Location within Iran
- Coordinates: 36°42′46″N 46°00′56″E
- Country: Iran
- Province: West Azerbaijan
- County: Mahabad
- Bakhsh: Central
- Rural District: Akhtachi-ye Gharbi

Population (2006)
  - Total: 241
- Time zone: UTC+3:30 (IRST)
  - Summer (DST): UTC+4:30 (IRDT)

Qurghan (Persian: قورغان, also Romanized as Qūrghān) is a village in Akhtachi-ye Gharbi Rural District, in the Central District of Mahabad County, West Azerbaijan Province, Iran. At the 2006 census, its population was 241, in 52 families.
