= Nivan Rural District =

Rural district in Isfahan province, Iran

Nivan Rural District Persian: دهستان نيوان
- Rural District
- Location within Iran
- Coordinates: 33°22′N 50°31′E
- Country: Iran
- Province: Isfahan
- County: Golpayegan
- District: Central
- Established: 1987
- Capital: Nivan-e Nar

Population (2016)
  - Total: 4,835
- Time zone: UTC+3:30 (IRST)

Nivan Rural District (Persian: دهستان نيوان) is in the Central District of Golpayegan County, Isfahan province, Iran. Its capital is the village of Nivan-e Nar.

== Demographics ==
=== Population ===
At the time of the 2006 National Census, the rural district's population was 5,358 in 1,722 households. There were 5,309 inhabitants in 1,744 households at the following census of 2011. The 2016 census measured the population of the rural district as 4,835 in 1,664 households. The most populous of its 24 villages was Nivan-e Nar, with 1,010 people.

=== Other villages in the rural district ===
- Dor
- Nivan-e Suq
- Shurcheh, Golpayegan
- Tikan
- Vaneshan
- Zaranjan
