= Guged =

City in Isfahan province, Iran

Guged Persian: گوگد
- City
- Location within Iran
- Coordinates: 33°28′36″N 50°21′18″E
- Country: Iran
- Province: Isfahan
- County: Golpayegan
- District: Central

Population (2016)
  - Total: 6,012
- Time zone: UTC+3:30 (IRST)

Guged (Persian: گوگد) (Note: Also romanized as Googad, Gouged, Gugad, and Gūgad) is a city in the Central District of Golpayegan County, Isfahan province, Iran.

Ayatollah Golpayegani General Clinic is located in this city and provides services to patients in various fields such as laboratory, radiology, MRI and general and specialized medical services. This hospital was built by Ayatollah Golpayegani about 20 years ago.

== Demographics ==
=== Population ===
At the time of the 2006 National Census, the city's population was 6,686 in 2,031 households. The following census in 2011 counted 6,008 people in 2,029 households. The 2016 census measured the population of the city as 6,012 people in 2,131 households.
