= Zamenabad, Kurdistan =

Zamenabad ضامن آباد
- Village
- Location within Iran
- Coordinates: 36°06′27″N 46°37′40″E
- Country: Iran
- Province: Kurdistan
- County: Saqqez
- Bakhsh: Ziviyeh
- Rural District: Emam

Population (2006)
  - Total: 102
- Time zone: UTC+3:30 (IRST)
  - Summer (DST): UTC+4:30 (IRDT)

Zamenabad (Persian: ضامن آباد, also Romanized as Ẕāmenābād; also known as Zamīnābād) is a village in Emam Rural District, Ziviyeh District, Saqqez County, Kurdistan Province, Iran. At the 2006 census, its population was 102, in 22 families. The village is populated by Kurds.
