= Golpayegan =

City in Isfahan province, Iran

Golpayegan Persian: گلپایگان
- City
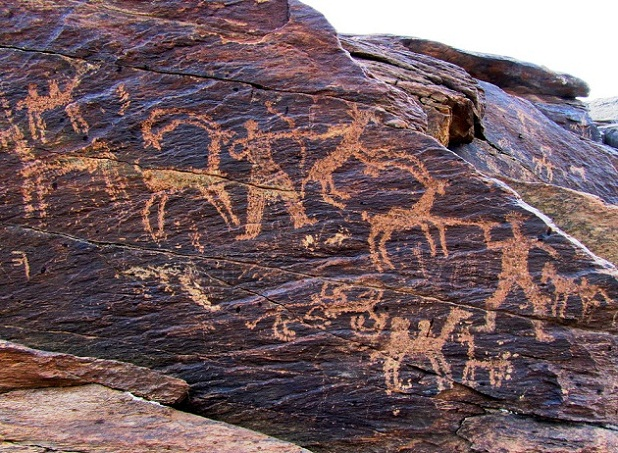
- Khomeyn rock art

- Location within Iran
- Coordinates: 33°27′03″N 50°16′54″E
- Country: Iran
- Province: Isfahan
- County: Golpayegan
- District: Central
- Elevation: 1,830 m (6,000 ft)

Population (2016)
  - Total: 58,936
- Time zone: UTC+3:30 (IRST)
- Area code: 031
- Website: www.akhale.ir

Golpayegan (Persian: گلپایگان) (Note: Also romanized as Golpāyegān; also known as Shahr-e Golpāyegān (شهر گلپایگان) (English: City of Golpayegan). Historically, the name of the city has been recorded as Vartpadegān; Jorfadeghan, Darbayagan, Kuhpayegan, and Golbādagān. Golpayegan means "fortress of flowers" and "land of tulips" (سرزمین گلهای سرخ), romanized as Sarzamin-e golha-ye sorkh) is a city in the Central District of Golpayegan County, Isfahan, Iran, serving as capital of both the county and the district. The city is 186 kilometres (116 mi) northwest of Isfahan and 102 kilometres (63 mi) southeast of Arak, at an altitude of 1,830 m. Its temperature fluctuates between +37 and -10 °C. Its average annual rainfall is 300 mm.

== History ==
According to Ḥamd-Allāh Mostawfi, the town of Golpāyegān was built by the daughter of Bahman, named Samra, also known as Homāy Bente Bahman in Persian.

After Parsadan Gorgijanidze was dismissed from his post as prefect (darugheh) of Isfahan, he was appointed as the new eshik-agha (Master of Ceremonies) and given five villages in the confines of Golpayegan as a fief by king (shah) Abbas II (r. 1642-1666). Historically, the name of the town has been recorded as Karbāyagān; Jarbāḏaqān; Darbāyagān; and Golbādagān. Golpayegan Kebab is unique and made from endemic cows; it is registered in Iranian intangible heritage list.

== Demographics ==
=== Population ===
At the time of the 2006 National Census, the city's population was 47,849 in 14,263 households. The following census in 2011 counted 54,572 people in 17,411 households. The 2016 census measured the population of the city as 58,936 people in 19,546 households.

== Geography ==
=== Location ===
Golpayegan is located in the center of Iran, 156 km northwest of Isfahan. Golpayegan is located in the north of Khomein and is adjacent to Khansar from the south, Aligudars from the west, and Memeh from the east. Its people speak Persian and the Golpayegani dialect. Most of the inhabitants are engaged in agriculture and animal husbandry.

=== Climate ===
Golpayegan has a cold semi-arid climate (Köppen BSk).

Climate data for Golpayegan (1992-2005 normals)
Month	Jan	Feb	Mar	Apr	May	Jun	Jul	Aug	Sep	Oct	Nov	Dec	Year
Daily mean °C (°F)	0.8 (33.4)	3.4 (38.1)	7.3 (45.1)	13.2 (55.8)	17.8 (64.0)	23.6 (74.5)	27.1 (80.8)	26.5 (79.7)	21.9 (71.4)	15.5 (59.9)	8.5 (47.3)	4.2 (39.6)	14.2 (57.5)
Mean daily minimum °C (°F)	−4.2 (24.4)	−2.0 (28.4)	1.7 (35.1)	7.4 (45.3)	11.3 (52.3)	16.4 (61.5)	20.0 (68.0)	19.1 (66.4)	14.1 (57.4)	8.6 (47.5)	2.8 (37.0)	−0.9 (30.4)	7.9 (46.1)
Average precipitation mm (inches)	37.2 (1.46)	31.7 (1.25)	52.7 (2.07)	44.6 (1.76)	26.1 (1.03)	3.1 (0.12)	1.7 (0.07)	1.8 (0.07)	0.2 (0.01)	5.5 (0.22)	30.2 (1.19)	38.9 (1.53)	273.7 (10.78)
Average snowy days	4.5	2.4	1.5	0.2	0	0	0	0	0	0	0.1	1.7	10.4
Average relative humidity (%)	60	50	46	41	34	24	23	21	24	34	49	59	39
Average dew point °C (°F)	−6.0 (21.2)	−6.3 (20.7)	−4.3 (24.3)	−0.2 (31.6)	1.6 (34.9)	1.9 (35.4)	4.4 (39.9)	3.1 (37.6)	0.4 (32.7)	−0.7 (30.7)	−2.2 (28.0)	−3.6 (25.5)	−1.0 (30.2)
Source: IRIMO (temperatures), (dew point), (humidity), (precipitation), (snow/sleet days)

== Historical monuments ==
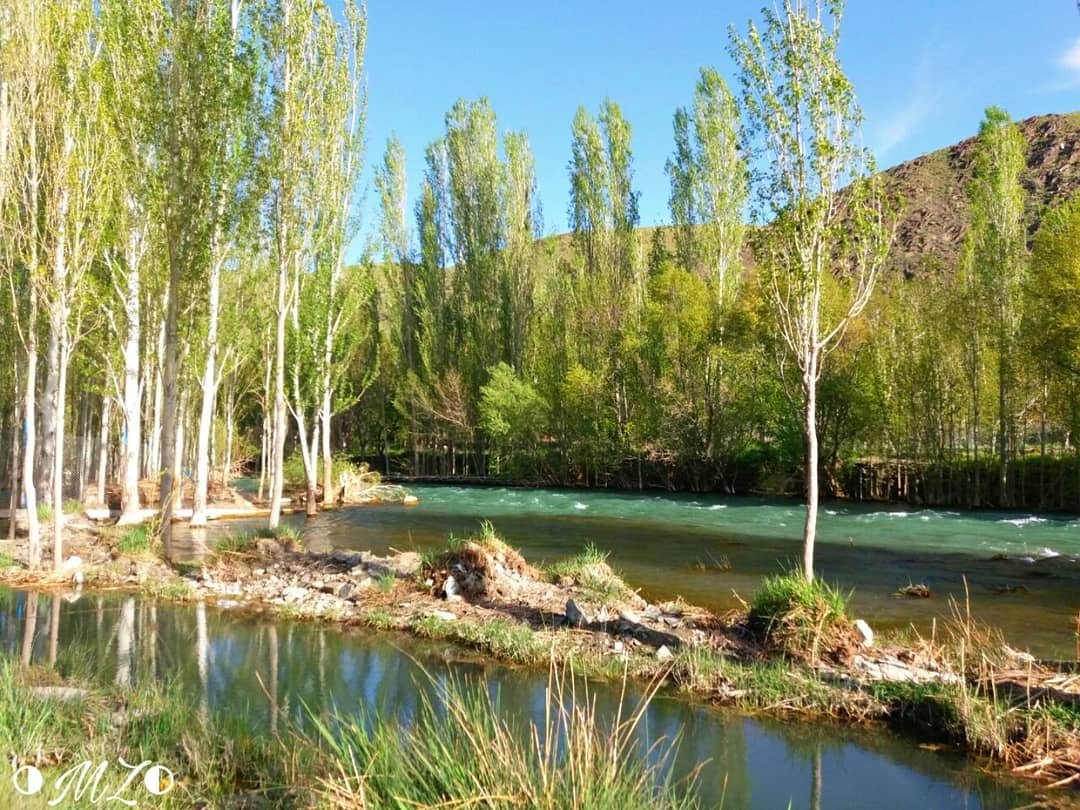

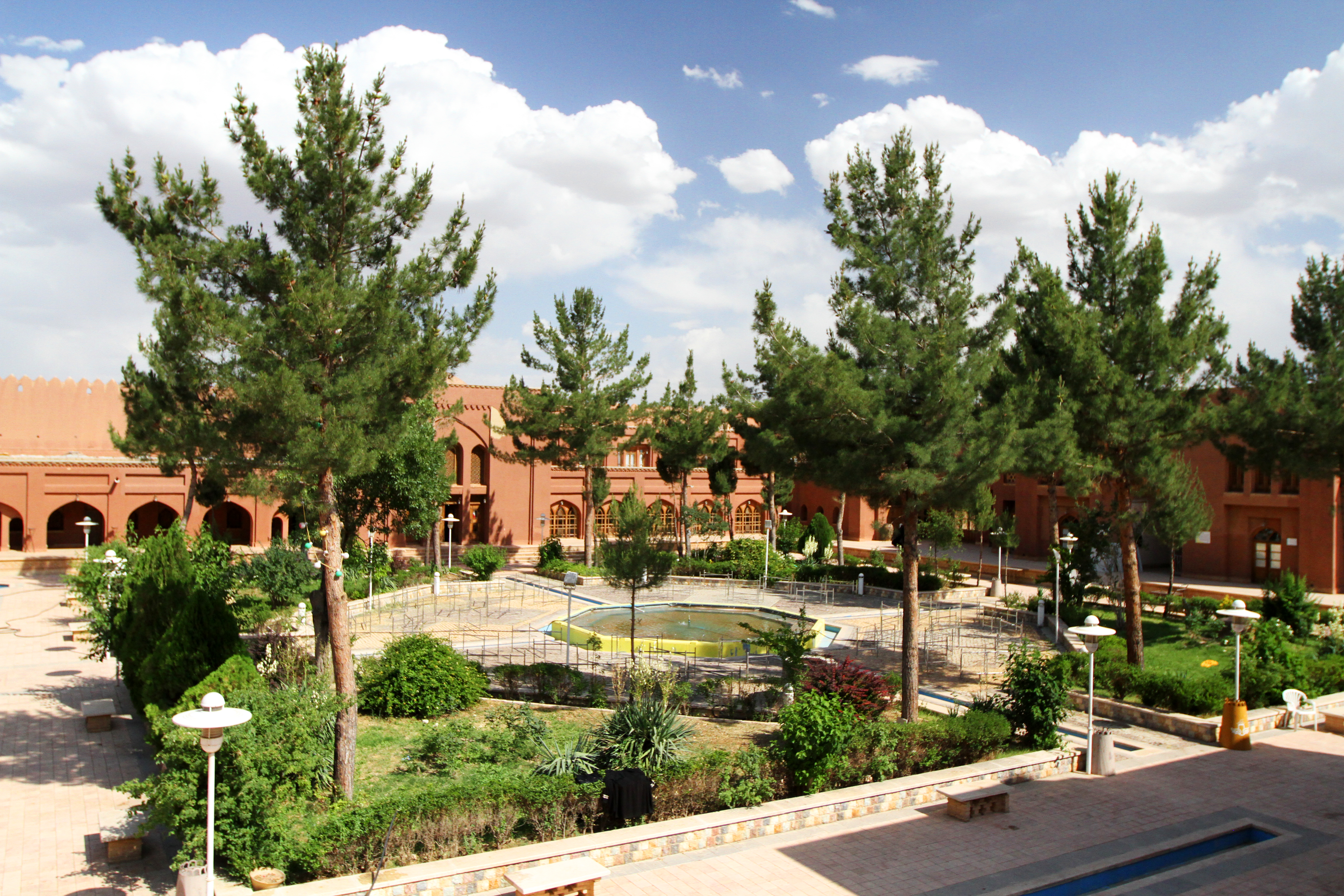
Gouged Stronghold, Golpayegan, Isfahan Province, Iran

Several historical monuments are located in the Jāme' mosque of Golpayegan (Persian: مسجد جامِع, "The Congregational Mosque"), a minaret (Manār) from the Seljuk period, the Sarāvar mosque from the 15th-16th centuries, as well as the Hevdah Tan shrine from the 17th century, Gouged Stronghold, the stronghold was used as a caravansary, but during war time or when bandits attacked, it was used as a castle.

== See also ==
Media related to Golpayegan at Wikimedia Commons

== Sources ==
- Giunashvili, Jemshid (2016). "GORGIJANIDZE, PARSADAN". Encyclopaedia Iranica.
- Paghava, Irdkli; Turkid, Severian; Akopyan, Alexander (Winter 2010). "The cross-in-circle mark on the silver coins of the Safavid ruler, Sultān Husayn, from the Iravān mint" (PDF). Journal of the Oriental Numismatic Society (202): 20–22. ISSN 1818-1252.
