= Kenarrudkhaneh Rural District =

Rural district in Isfahan province, Iran

Kenarrudkhaneh Rural District Persian: دهستان كناررودخانه
- Rural District
- Location within Iran
- Coordinates: 33°29′N 50°10′E
- Country: Iran
- Province: Isfahan
- County: Golpayegan
- District: Central
- Capital: Saidabad

Population (2016)
  - Total: 7,051
- Time zone: UTC+3:30 (IRST)

Kenarrudkhaneh Rural District (Persian: دهستان كناررودخانه) is in the Central District of Golpayegan County, Isfahan province, Iran. Its capital is the village of Saidabad.

== Demographics ==
=== Population ===
At the time of the 2006 National Census, the rural district's population was 8,721 in 2,520 households. There were 8,094 inhabitants in 2,620 households at the following census of 2011. The 2016 census measured the population of the rural district as 7,051 in 2,476 households. The most populous of its 49 villages was Robat-e Sorkh-e Olya, with 1,910 people.

=== Other villages in the rural district ===
- Darb-e Emamzadeh Ebrahim
- Faqestan
- Farajabad
- Hendeh
- Malazjan
- Mazraeh
- Qaleqan
- Qorghan
- Robat-e Abu ol Qasem
- Robat-e Mahmud
