= Central District (Golpayegan County) =

District in Isfahan province, Iran

Central District (Golpayegan County) Persian: بخش مرکزی شهرستان گلپایگان
- District
- Location within Iran
- Coordinates: 33°26′N 50°21′E
- Country: Iran
- Province: Isfahan
- County: Golpayegan
- Capital: Golpayegan

Population (2016)
  - Total: 90,082
- Time zone: UTC+3:30 (IRST)

The Central District of Golpayegan County (Persian: بخش مرکزی شهرستان گلپایگان) is in Isfahan province, Iran. Its capital is the city of Golpayegan.

== Demographics ==
=== Population ===
At the time of the 2006 National Census, the district's population was 82,601 in 24,701 households. The following census in 2011 counted 87,479 people in 28,190 households. The 2016 census measured the population of the district as 90,082 inhabitants in 30,415 households.

=== Administrative divisions ===
Central District (Golpayegan County) Population
Administrative Divisions	2006	2011	2016
Jolgeh RD	4,021	3,593	3,344
Kenarrudkhaneh RD	8,721	8,094	7,051
Nivan RD	5,358	5,309	4,835
Golpayegan (city)	47,849	54,572	58,936
Golshahr (city)	9,966	9,903	9,904
Guged (city)	6,686	6,008	6,012
Total	82,601	87,479	90,082
RD = Rural District
