= Golpayegan County =

County in Isfahan province, Iran

Golpayegan County Persian: شهرستان گلپایگان
- County
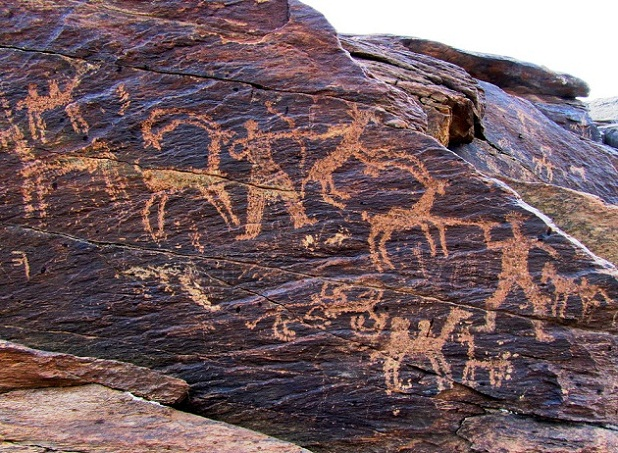
- Golpayegan petroglyphs

- Location of Golpayegan County in Isfahan province (top left, purple)

- Location of Isfahan province in Iran
- Coordinates: 33°26′N 50°21′E
- Country: Iran
- Province: Isfahan
- Capital: Golpayegan
- Districts: Central

Population (2016)
  - Total: 90,086
- Time zone: UTC+3:30 (IRST)

Golpayegan County (Persian: شهرستان گلپایگان) is in Isfahan, Iran. Its capital is the city of Golpayegan.

== Demographics ==
=== Population ===
In 1339-40 Golpayegan had some fifty villages, yielding the annual revenue of 42,000 dinars to the state, hinting that the city was very wealthy. In 1821-22, Golpayegan had some 2,000 households. Its population in 1906-7 was 12,000 to 15,000. In 1996, the county had a population of 84,081 people, of whom 45,756 lived in urban areas.

At the time of the 2006 National Census, the county's population was 82,601 in 24,701 households. The following census in 2011 counted 87,479 people in 28,190 households. The 2016 census measured the population of the county as 90,086 in 30,419 households.

=== Administrative divisions ===
Golpayegan County's population history and administrative structure over three consecutive censuses are shown in the following table.

Golpayegan County Population
Administrative Divisions	2006	2011	2016
Central District	82,601	87,479	90,082
Jolgeh RD	4,021	3,593	3,344
Kenarrudkhaneh RD	8,721	8,094	7,051
Nivan RD	5,358	5,309	4,835
Golpayegan (city)	47,849	54,572	58,936
Golshahr (city)	9,966	9,903	9,904
Guged (city)	6,686	6,008	6,012
Total	82,601	87,479	90,086
RD = Rural District

== Geography ==
Golpayegan is in Isfahan province, bordered on the south by the Bakhtiari Mountains and Khansar County, on the east by Shahin Shahr and Meymeh County, on the north by the counties of Mahallat and Khomeyn, and on the west by Aligudarz County in Lorestan province.

=== Ghebla River ===
The most important river of Golpayegan, Ghebla River, runs through the county, irrigating Khomeyn, Delijan, and Mahallat Counties before eventually emptying into the Gavkhuni salt swamp near Isfahan.

=== Golpayegan Dam ===
The 57-meter-high Golpayegan Dam, or Sad-e Golpayegan (سد گلپایگان), has been constructed on Ghebla River at Aḵhteḵhun, located 18 km southeast of Golpayegan. Designed by Engineer Aligholi Baiani (مهندس علینقی بیانی) it is the first modern dam in Iran. Irrigation in the area is by qanāt (قنات / کاریز), well, and spring waters.

== Earthquake of Golpayegan ==
The county's rural areas were devastated in the earthquake of 1316. According to Mostawfi,

== Agriculture ==
Agricultural products include wheat, cotton, barley, grains, sugar, beets, and various kinds of fruits.
(apricots, apples, pears, cherries, cantaloupes, cucumbers, grapes, sour cherries, watermelons...) Golpayegan has lot of Jeliz (in Persian: جیلیز Jeliz = Fruit and Vegetable Garden.

Animal husbandry is also practiced. The region has stands of mountain-almond, (in Persian:بادام کوهی
wild fig, and barberry, as well as wild thyme, London rocket seed khak shir, milk-vetch,(in Persian:خاکشیر) bugloss, and gum-tragacanth plants.

== Wildlife ==
The jackal, fox, wolf, and rabbit are among the wild animals found in the surrounding areas. There are also gold, silver, and gypsum deposits.

== Culture ==
Golpayegan is famous (not only for Kabab, Kalle Pache (کله پاچه) (sheep head, Khash), or Helium turkey...) is famous for its beautiful Persian rugs.

Handicrafts include carpet-weaving, giva (گیوه) cotton-shoe production, and wood-carving, Wood Sculpture, inlaid wood and embossed works.

== See also ==
Media related to Golpayegan County at Wikimedia Commons
