= Persian Revival =

Persian Revival (also separated as Sasanian Revival and Achaemenid Revival) is a 19th-century architectural movement that began in Iran and draws inspiration from Achaemenid, Parthian and Sasanian architecture. In Iran, the movement was started by the Qajar Shahs to represent themselves as heir to the ancient Persian empire and to distance themselves from the Islamic architectural style used by previous Iranian dynasties. The movement reached its zenith in the 20th century during the Pahlavi Era.

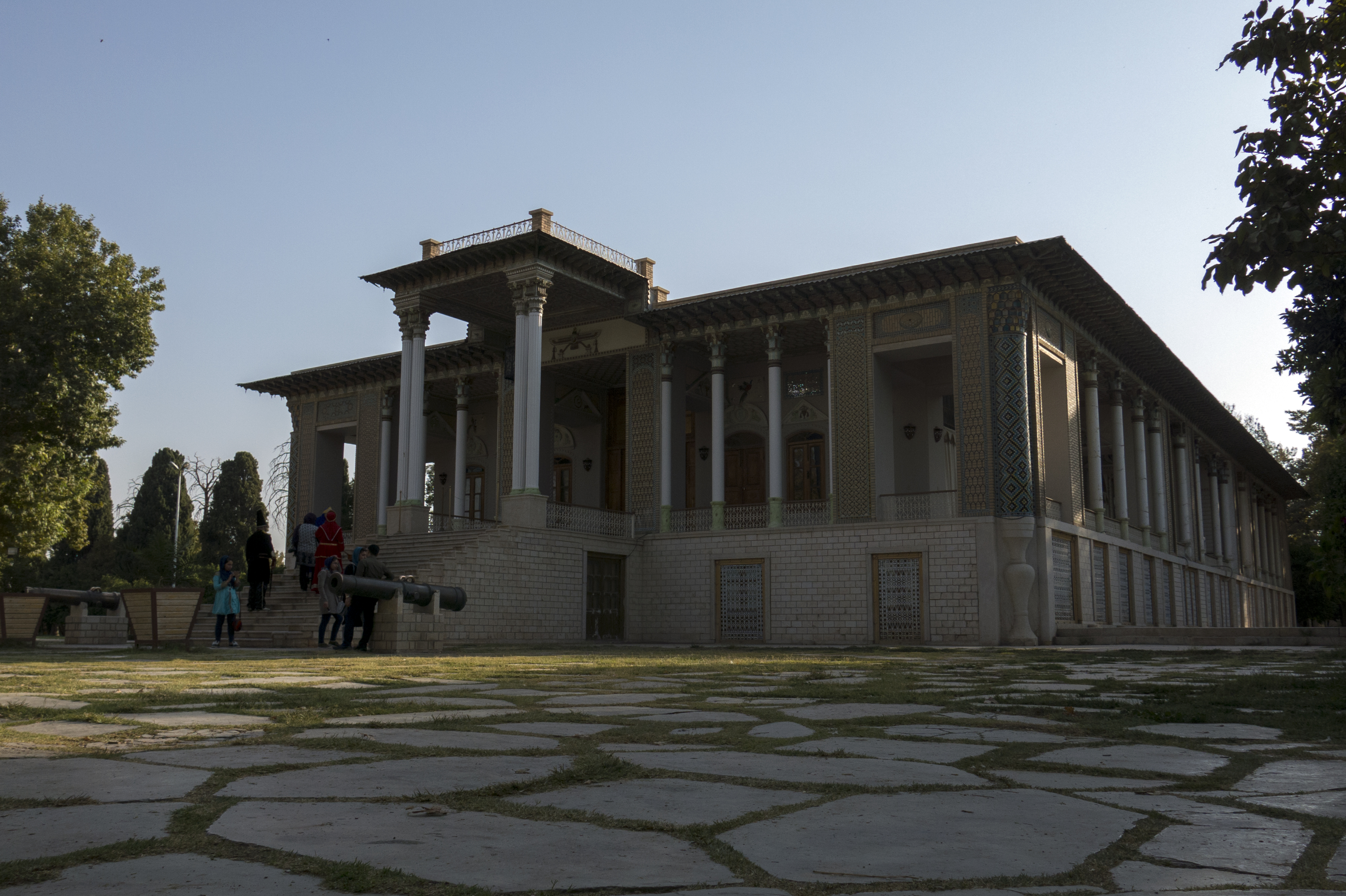
Afif-Abad Garden (1863–1867) in Shiraz is an example of Achaemenid and Sasanian revivalism
