= Persian column =

Column developed in ancient Persia

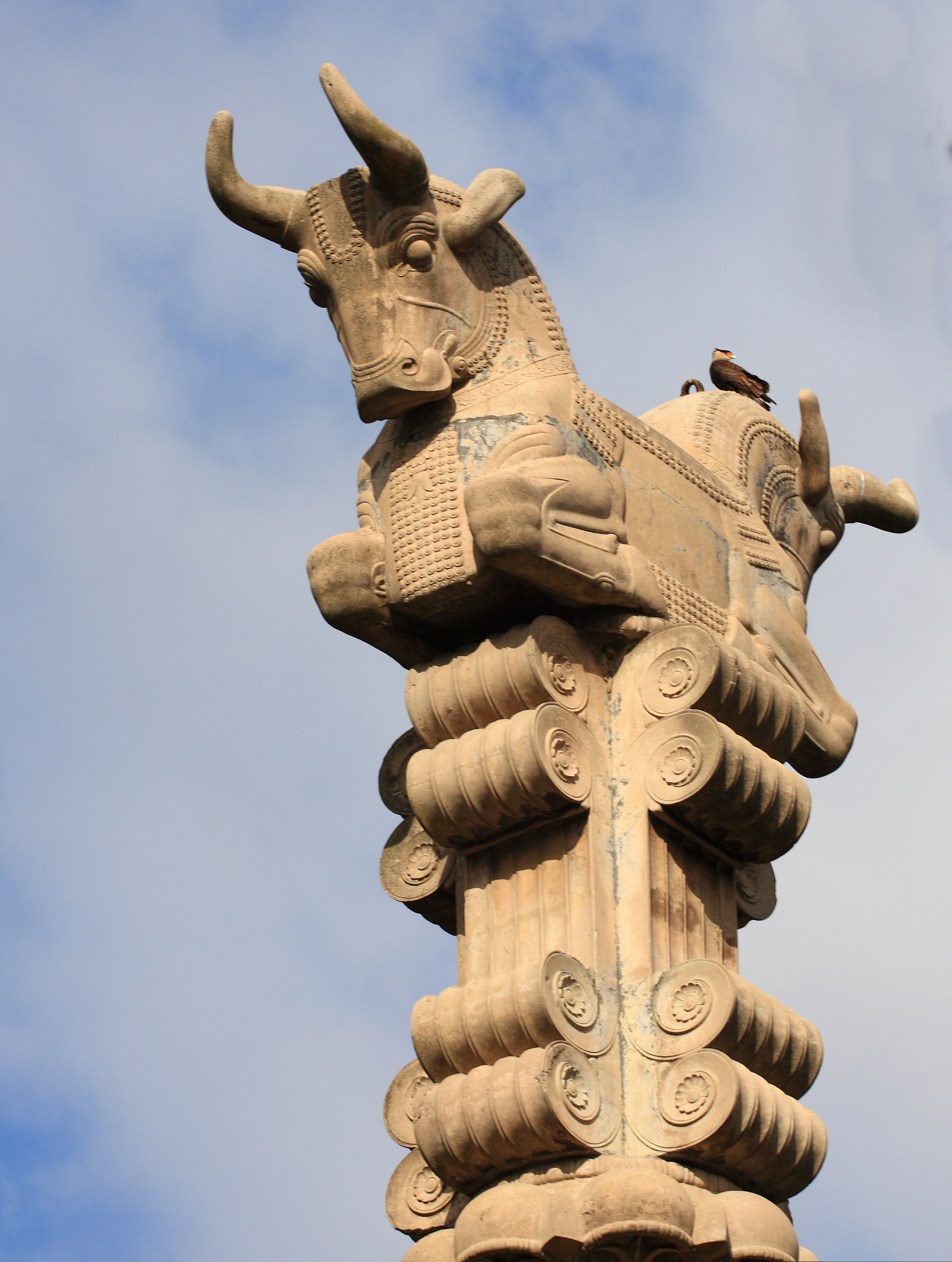
Top of an Achaemenid example from Persepolis

Persian columns or Persepolitan columns are the distinctive form of column developed in the Achaemenid architecture of ancient Persia, probably beginning shortly before 500 BCE. They are mainly known from Persepolis, where the massive main columns have a base, fluted shaft, and a double-animal capital, most with bulls. Achaemenid palaces had enormous hypostyle halls called apadana, which were supported inside by several rows of columns. The Throne Hall or "Hall of a Hundred Columns" at Persepolis, measuring 70 × 70 metres was built by the Achaemenid king Artaxerxes I. The apadana hall is even larger. These often included a throne for the king and were used for grand ceremonial assemblies; the largest at Persepolis and Susa could fit ten thousand people at a time.

By using carefully engineered wooden beams, the Achaemenid architects were able to use extremely slender columns to support open area roofs. This style was probably developed in the Palace of Darius in Susa, but the most numerous and complete survivals are at Persepolis, where several columns remain standing. Imperial building in the style stopped abruptly with the invasion by Alexander the Great in 330 BCE, when Persepolis was burned down.

== Description ==
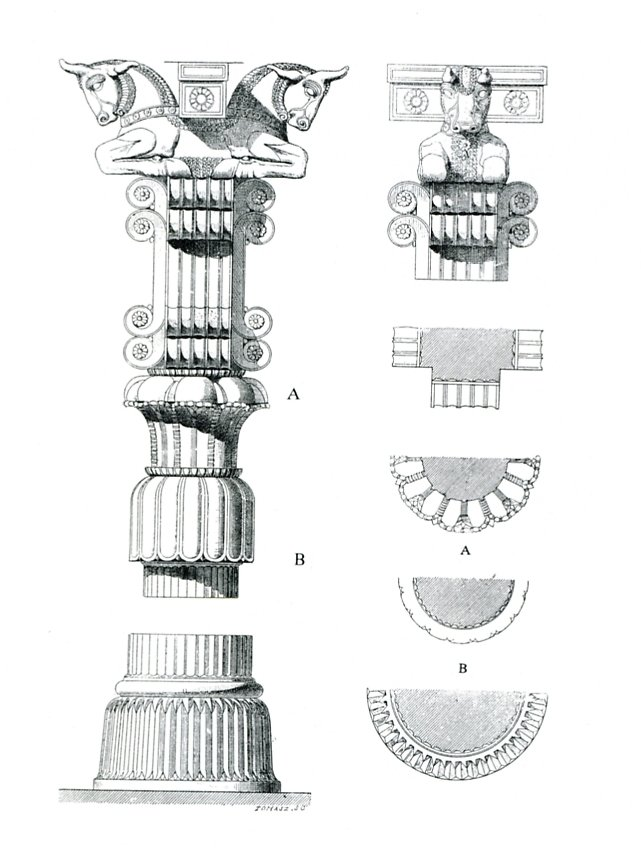
Plan, front view and side view of a typical Persepolis column

The forms of the columns and capitals vary somewhat between different buildings. Generally the capitals are carved with two heavily decorated back-to-back animals projecting out from the column. These function as brackets to support the architrave or roof timbers, while the flat backs of the animals support timbers running at right angles (see the reconstruction in the Louvre below). As they project the animals may be called protomes. The bull is the most common animal, but there are also lions, bulls with the head of a man in the style of the Assyrian lamassu, and griffins with the heads of eagles and the bodies of lions.

The bulls and lions may reflect the symbolism around Nowruz, the Persian New Year at the spring equinox, of an eternally fighting bull personifying the moon, and a lion personifying the Sun. This was the day when tributary nations presented their annual tribute to the king, as depicted in the stairway reliefs at Persepolis, and it has been suggested that Persepolis was specifically built for Nowruz celebrations.

The capital is much longer than in most other styles of columns. While some smaller columns move quickly from the animals to the plain shaft below, the largest and grandest examples have a long intervening section with double volutes at the top and, inverted, at the bottom of a long fluted square zone, although the shaft of the column is round. At the top of the round fluted shaft are two sections with a loosely plant-based design, the upper a form of "palm capital", spreading as it rises, and the lower suggesting leaves drooping downwards. Other capitals have the animals and the two lower plant-based elements, but not the section in between with the volutes; the example in Chicago is of this type. There are various small mouldings between the various elements, reflecting a Greek style. The horns and ears of the animals are often separate pieces, fitting into the head by square plugs. The columns were polished and at least the capitals were painted, in the case of wooden ones on a plaster coating. The style reflects influences from the many cultures that the Persian Empire conquered including Egypt, Babylon, and Lydia, as well as Greece, where the Persians had only temporary success; the final result is distinctively Persian.

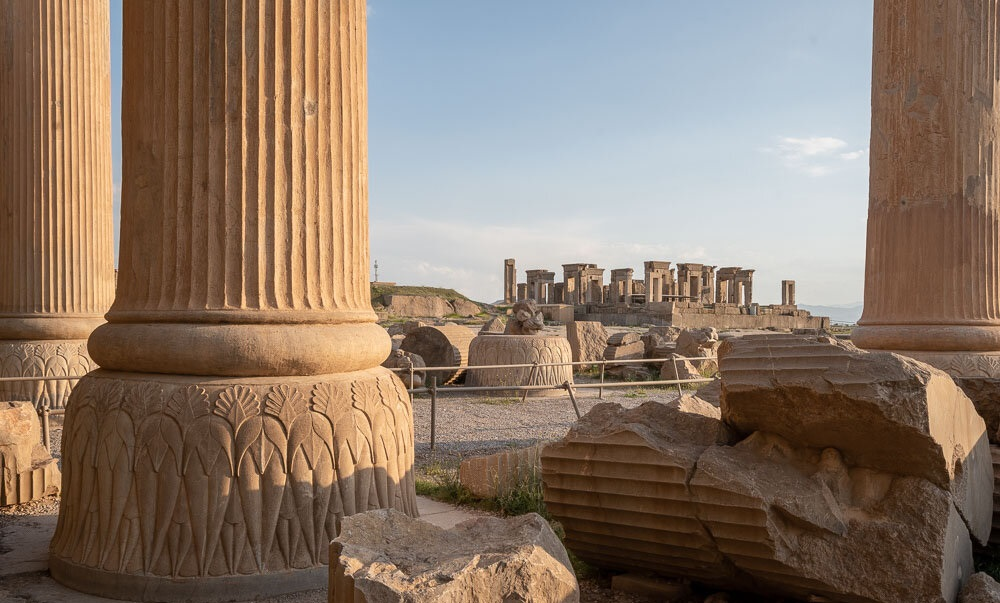
Column bases at Persepolis

=== Shaft and base ===
It is thought the stone columns that survive were preceded by wooden versions, and these continued to be used. The move to stone may have come when sufficiently large trees for the biggest buildings became difficult or impossible to source. The column shafts can be as tall as 20 metres. The base is in stone even for wooden columns, and sometimes carries an inscription saying which king erected the building. Most are round, but an early square type has two steps.

In grand settings the columns are usually fluted. The flutes are shallow, with arrises, like the Greek Doric order, but they are more numerous, and therefore narrower. The large columns at Persepolis have as many as 40 or 48 flutes, with smaller columns elsewhere 32; the width of a flute is kept fairly constant, so the number of flutes increases with the girth of the column, in contrast to the Greek practice of keeping the number of flutes on a column constant and varying the width of the flute. The early Doric temples seem to have had a similar principle, before 20 flutes became the convention.

Fluting is also found in other parts of the classical Persian column. The bases are often fluted, and the "bell" part of the capital has stylized plant ornament that comes close to fluting. Above this there is usually a tall section with four flat fluted volutes.

== Use and influence ==
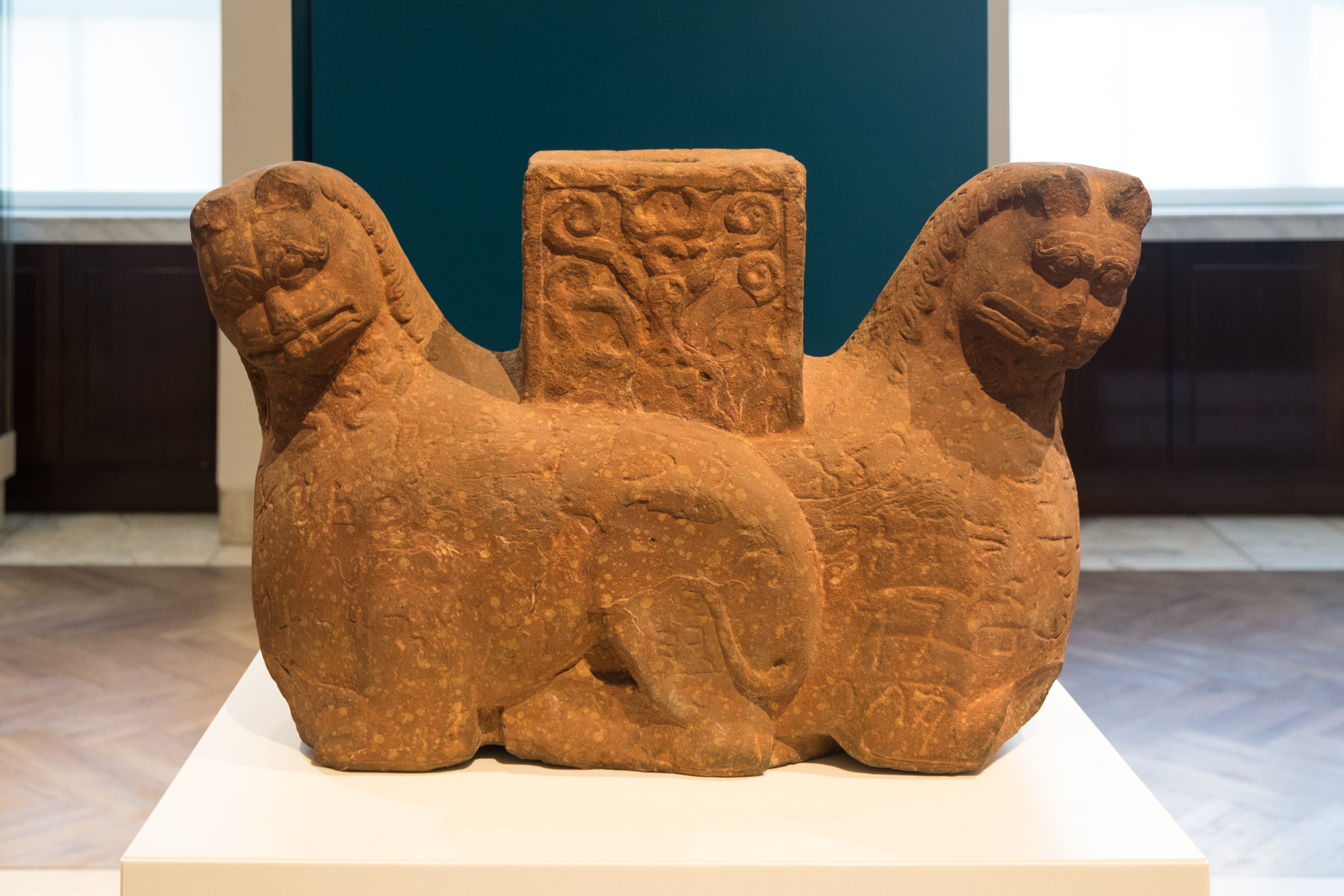
The Indo-Scythian Mathura lion capital, 0-10 CE

The full form of Persian column seems only to have been used at a few sites outside Persia around the empire in the Achaemenid period, in Armenia and even Levantine colonies in Iberia. The columns influenced the Pillars of Ashoka erected in India some 80 years after Alexander the Great destroyed the Persian Empire, and other imperial buildings in the architecture of the Maurya Empire.

The much smaller Mathura lion capital of the 1st century CE shows clear influence. They can be seen in relief decoration around Buddhist stupas in Gandhara in the 2nd or 3rd century CE, and Persian columns decorate the Karla Caves and Nasik Caves. The style did not develop in Persia itself, but elements continued to appear under later dynasties before the arrival of Islam.

== Modern revival ==
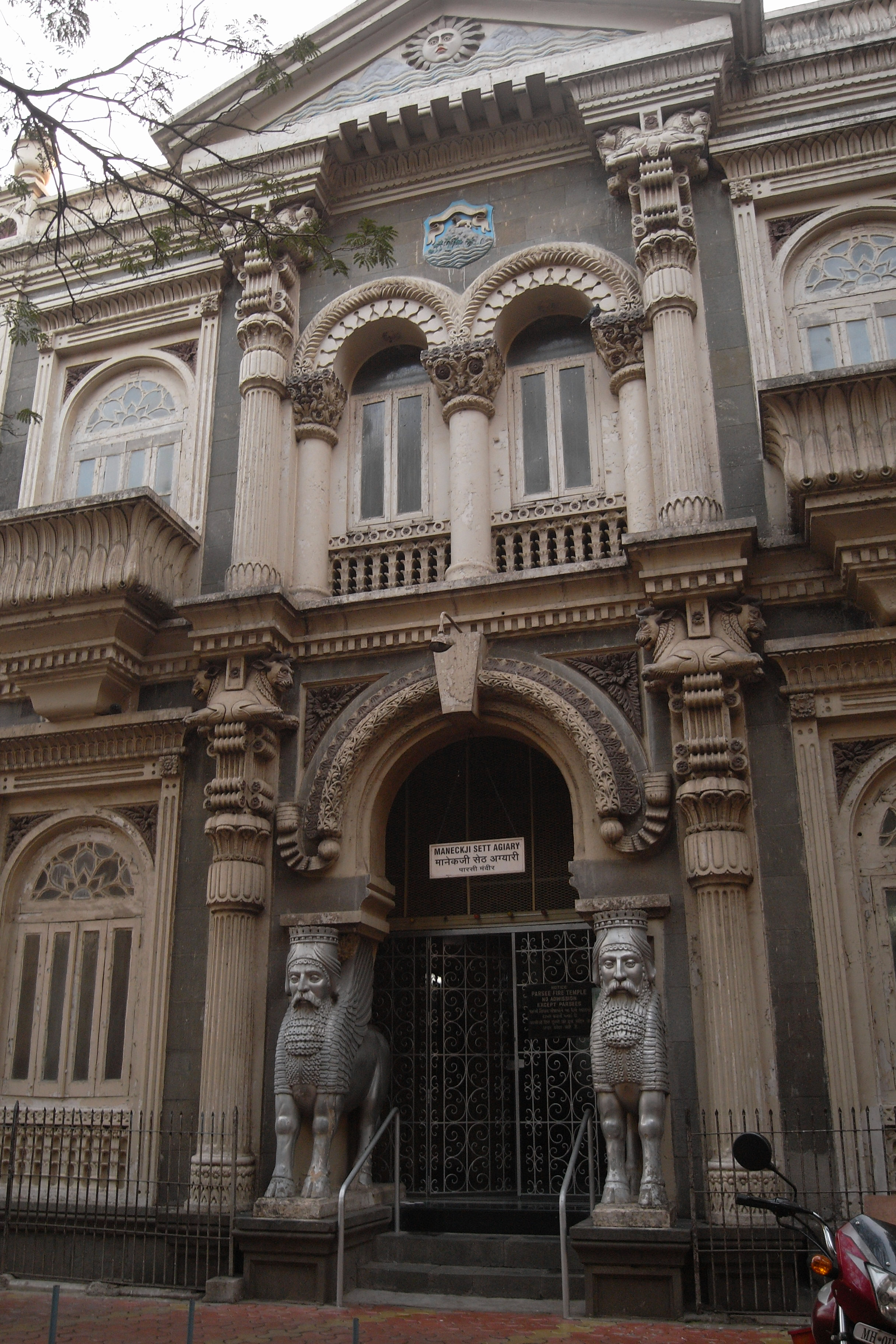
Maneckji Sett Agiary, a Parsi fire temple in Mumbai, India, 1891

From the 19th century the full Persepolitan form of the column was revived, initially by Parsees in India and eclectic architects in Europe, and only later used in public buildings in Iran during the Pahlavi era (from 1925), though the former Qajar era royal palace in Afif-Abad Garden, of 1863, tentatively uses some elements of the capitals.

Reza Shah, the first Pahlavi Shah, promoted interest in the Achaemenids in various ways to foster Iranian nationalism and support the legitimacy of his regime. Significant buildings in Tehran were supervised as to the authenticity of their style by European archaeologists, especially André Godard, Maxime Siroux (both also architects), and Ernst Herzfeld, who had been brought to Iran to dig, curate, and train students. These include the police headquarters and the Bank Melli Iran headquarters.

Though the Islamic Republic of Iran prefers buildings that refer to Islamic architecture, miniature Persian columns support the Scholars Pavilion donated to the United Nations Office at Vienna in 2009.

== Gallery ==
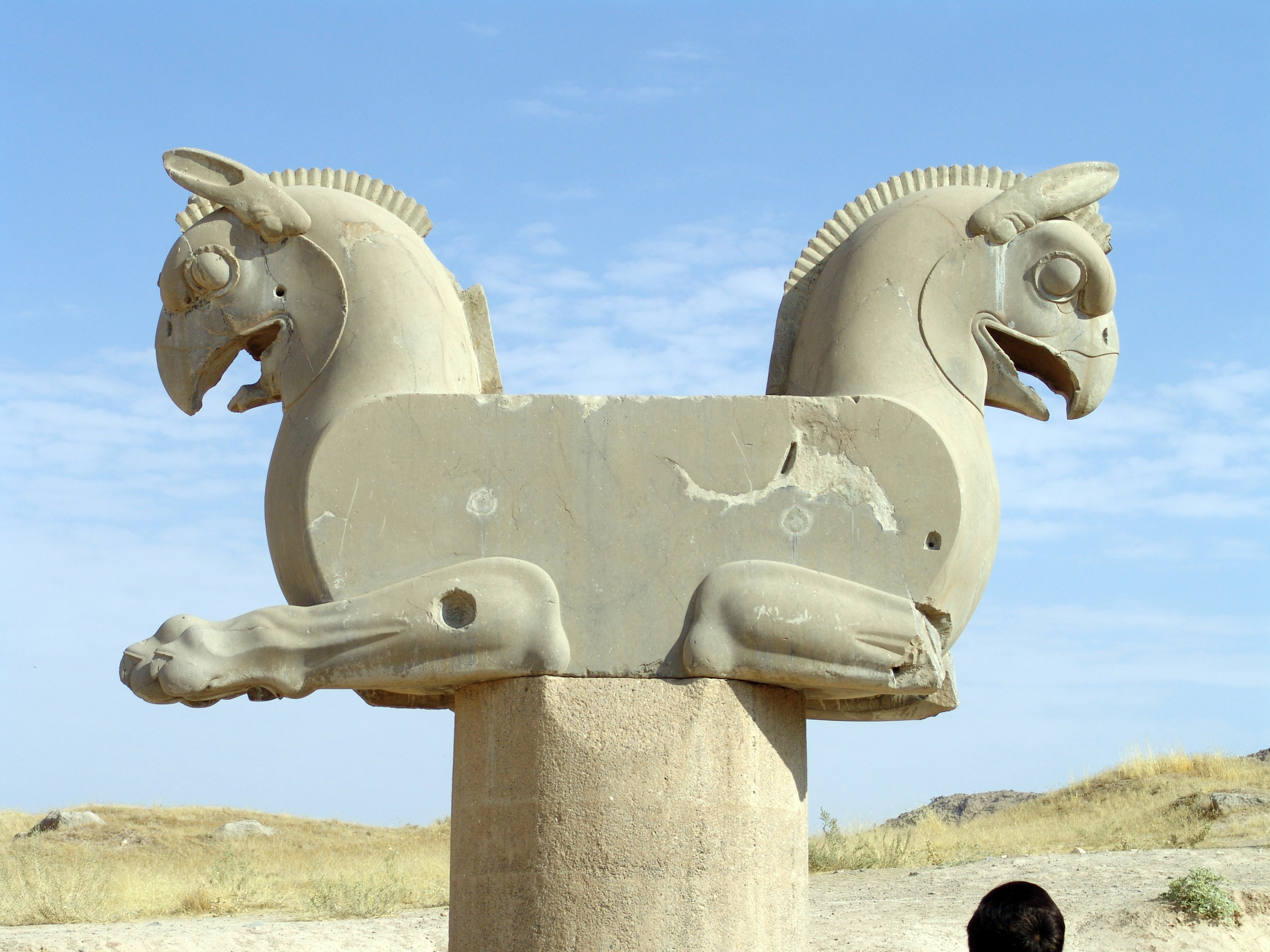
Griffin capital at Persepolis. The roof timbers presumably filled the flat side surface.

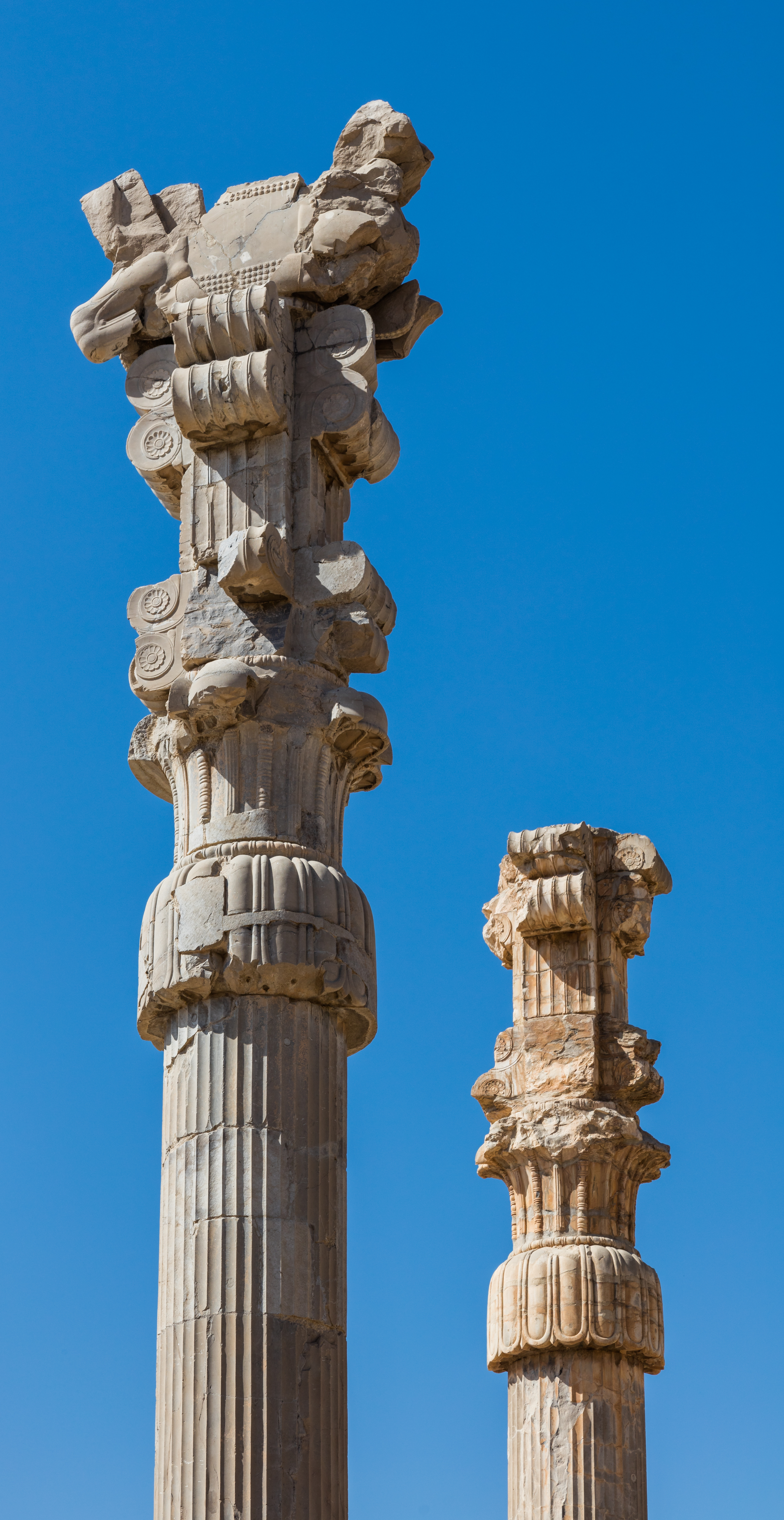
Ruins of Persepolis

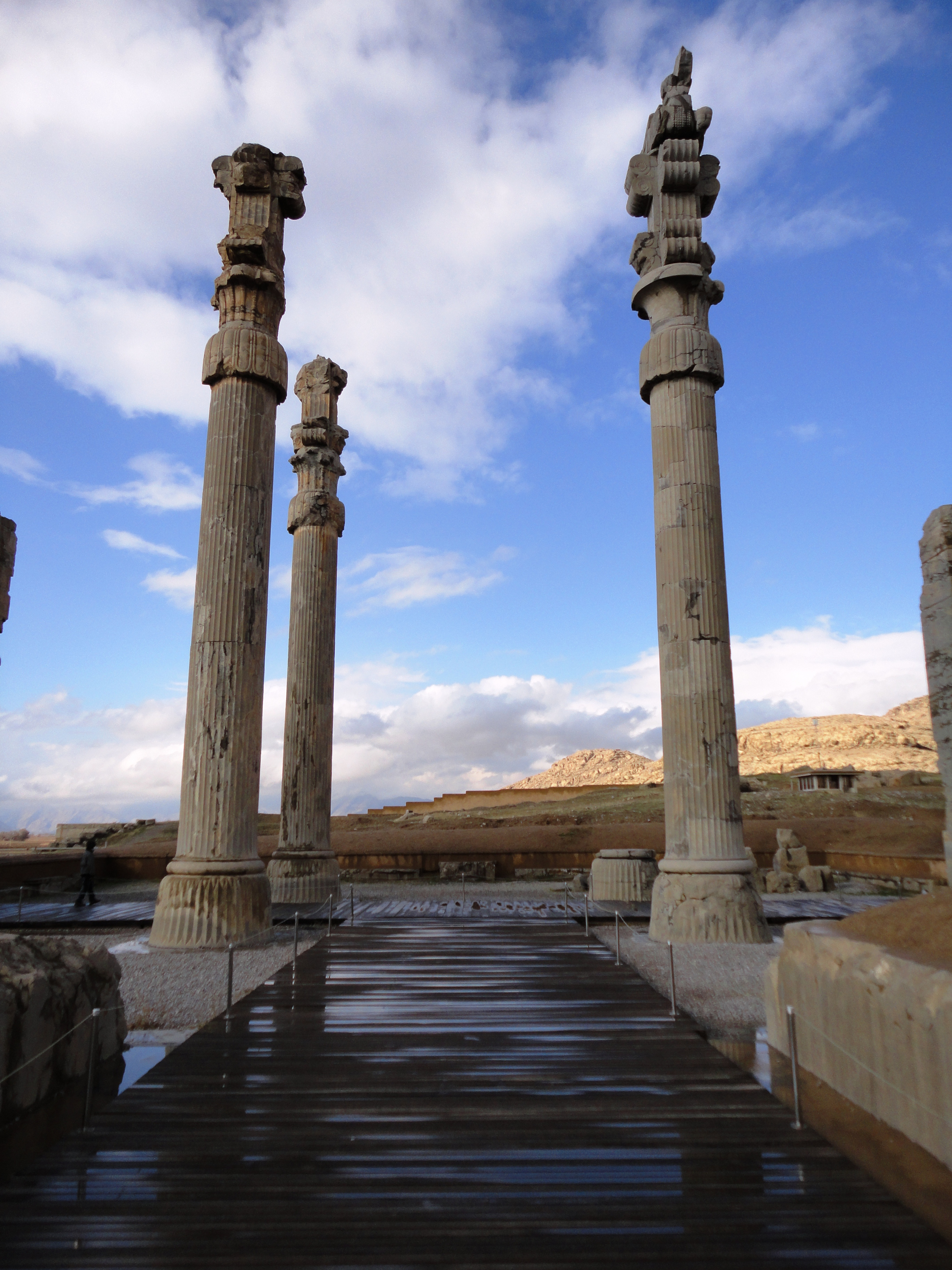
Ruins of Persepolis

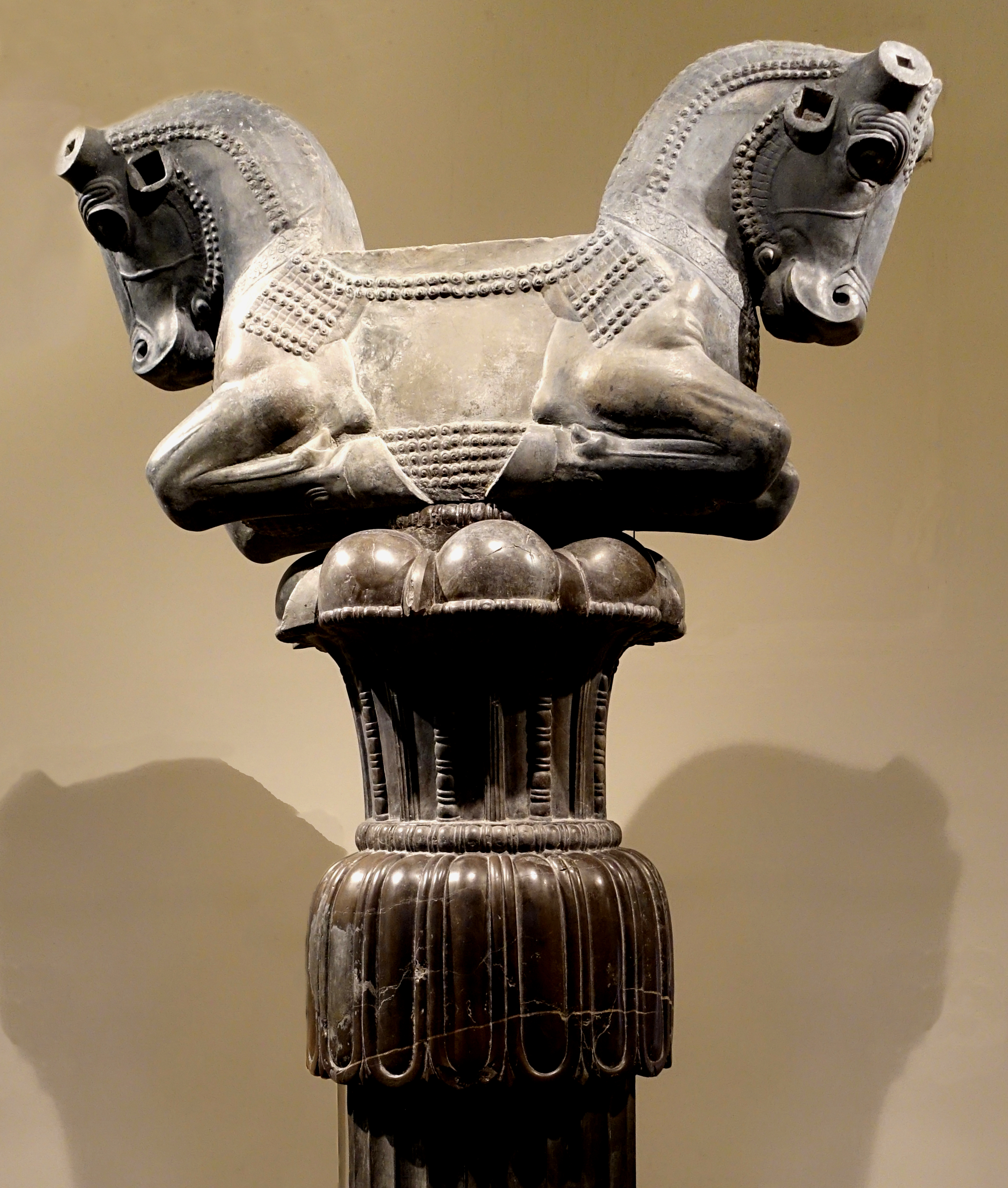
Another Achaemenid capital from Persepolis

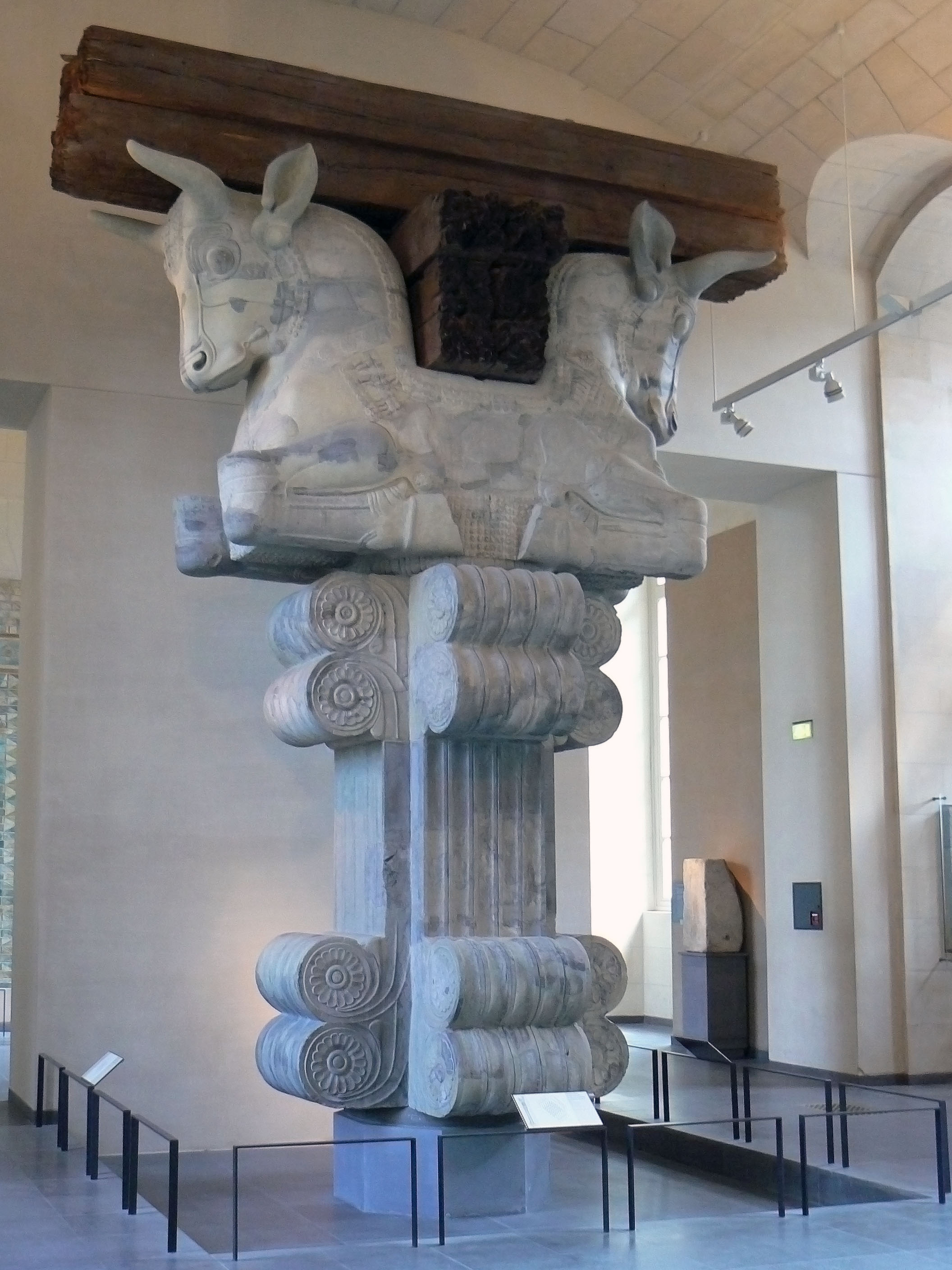
Bull capital from the Apadana of the Palace of Darius in Susa, now Louvre

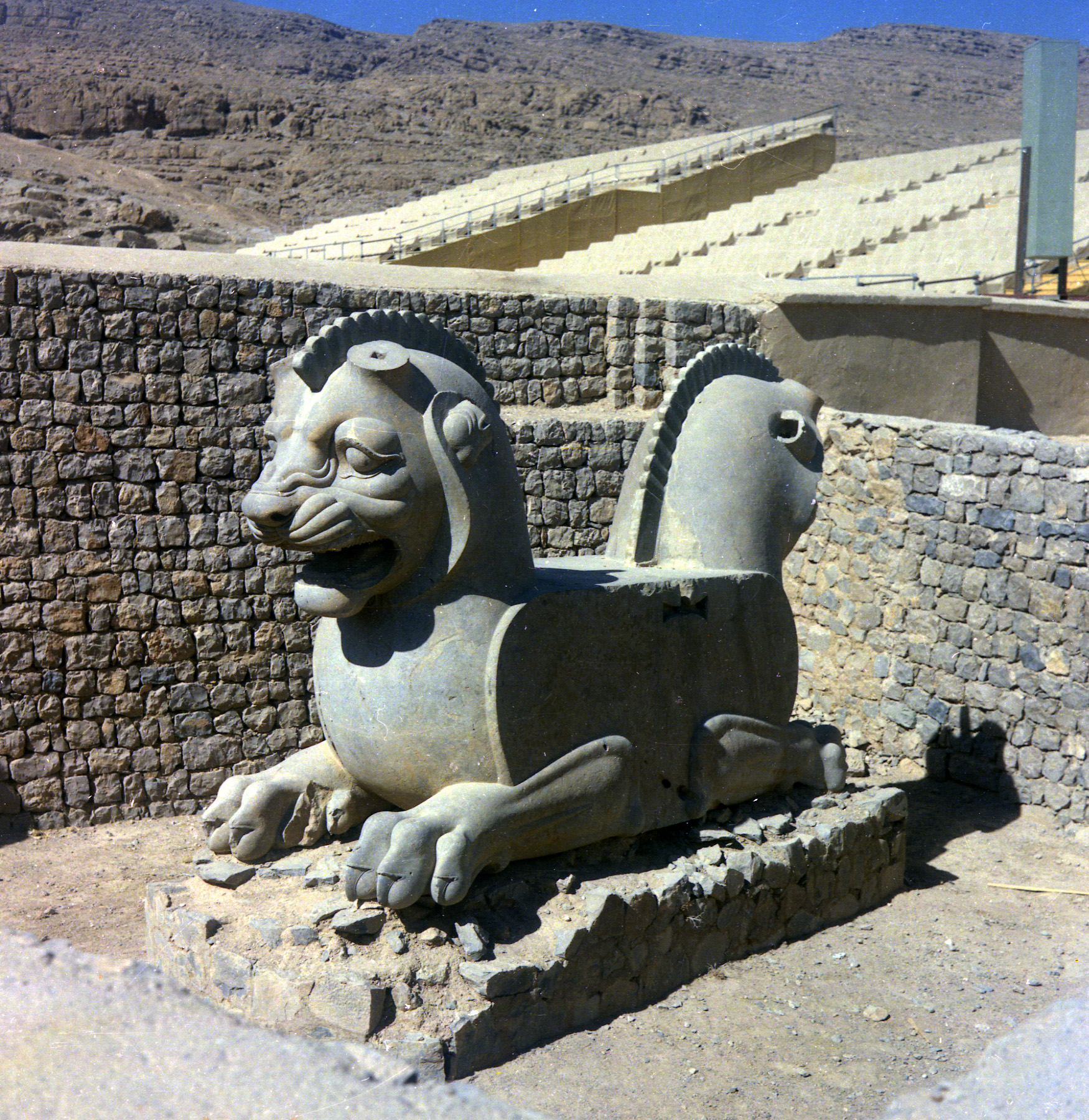
Lion capital at Persepolis

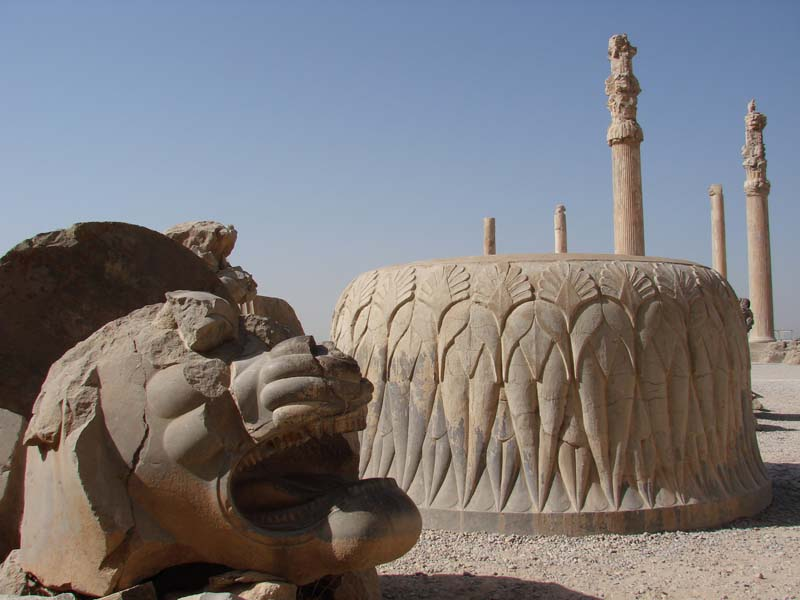
Lion fragment and column base at Persepolis

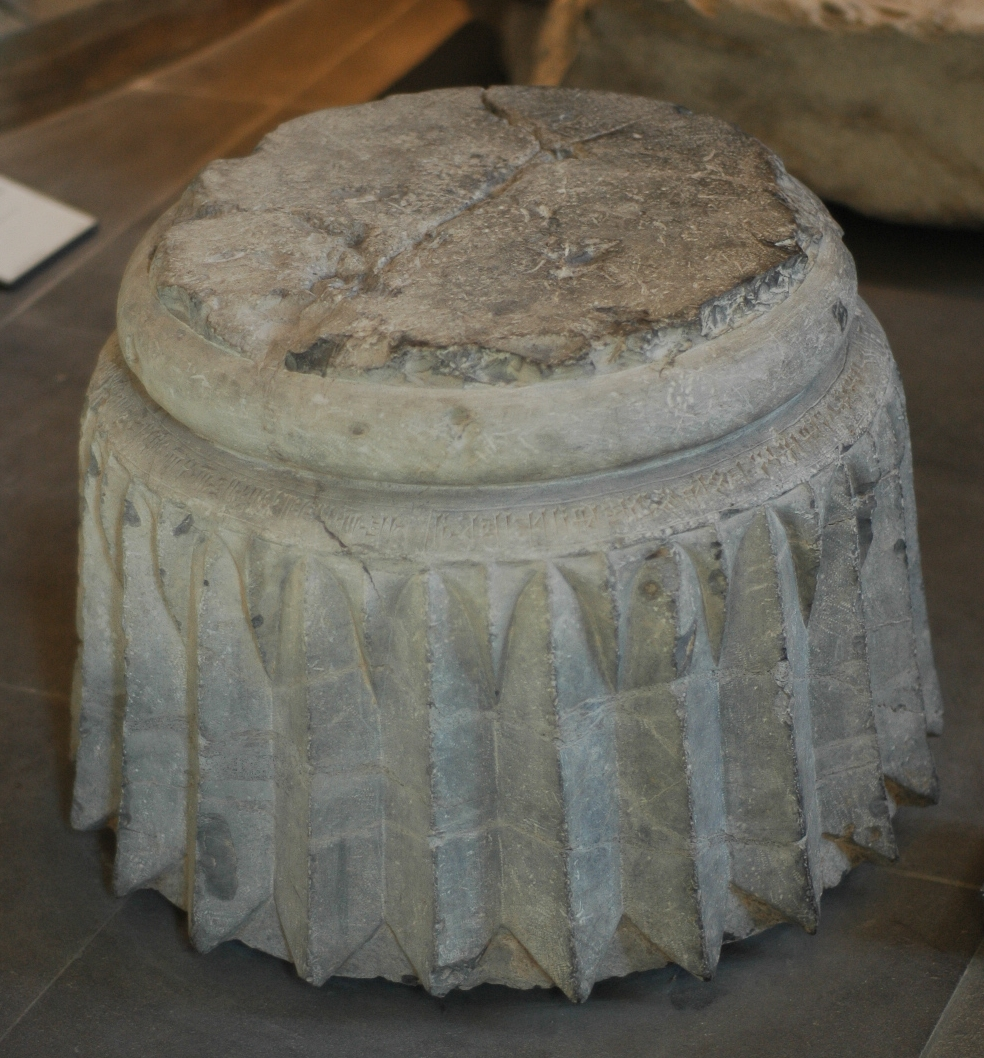
Base from Susa, with inscription

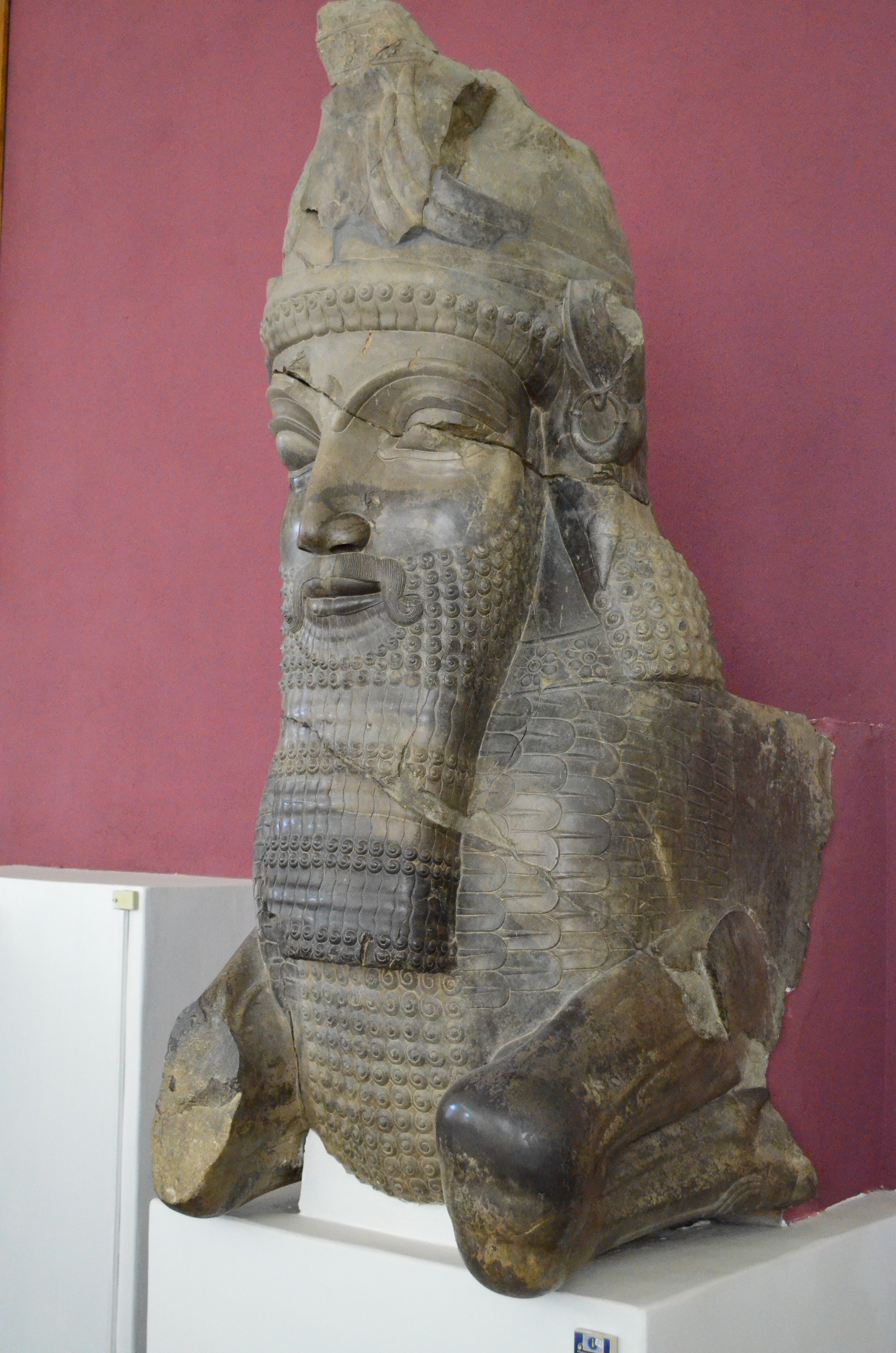
Broken man-bull capital from Persepolis

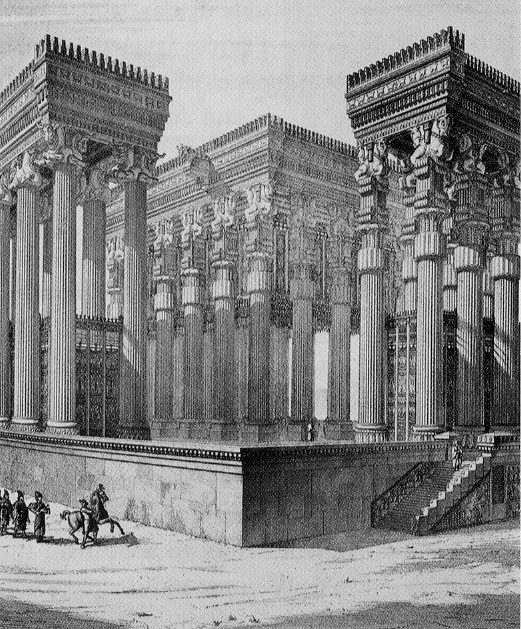
19th century reconstruction of Persepolis, by Flandin and Coste

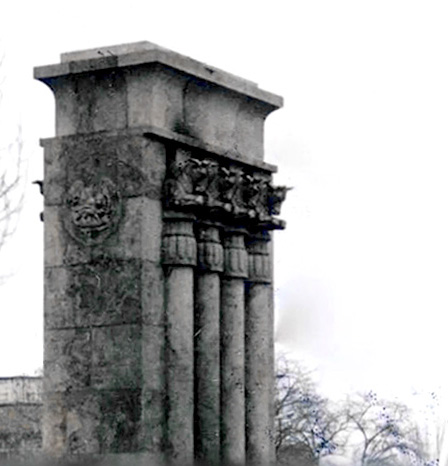
Statue Sq. of Mashhad

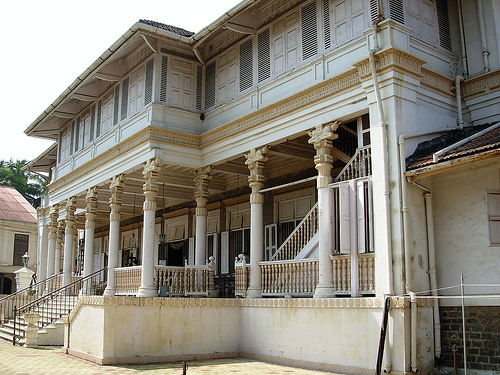
The Parsi Udvada Atash Behram, a fire temple in Udvada, India, 1894

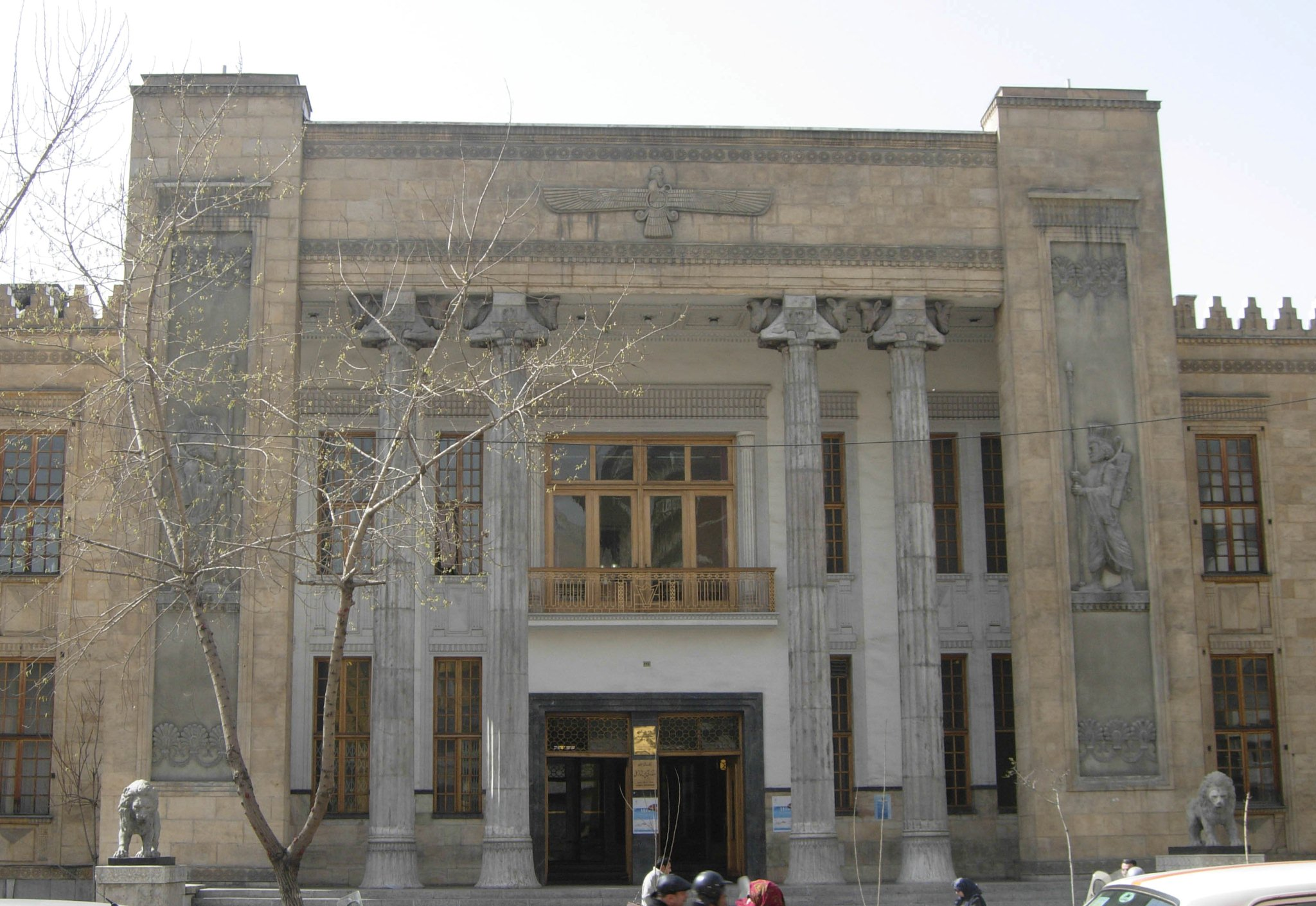
Bank Melli Building, Ferdowsi Ave, Tehran

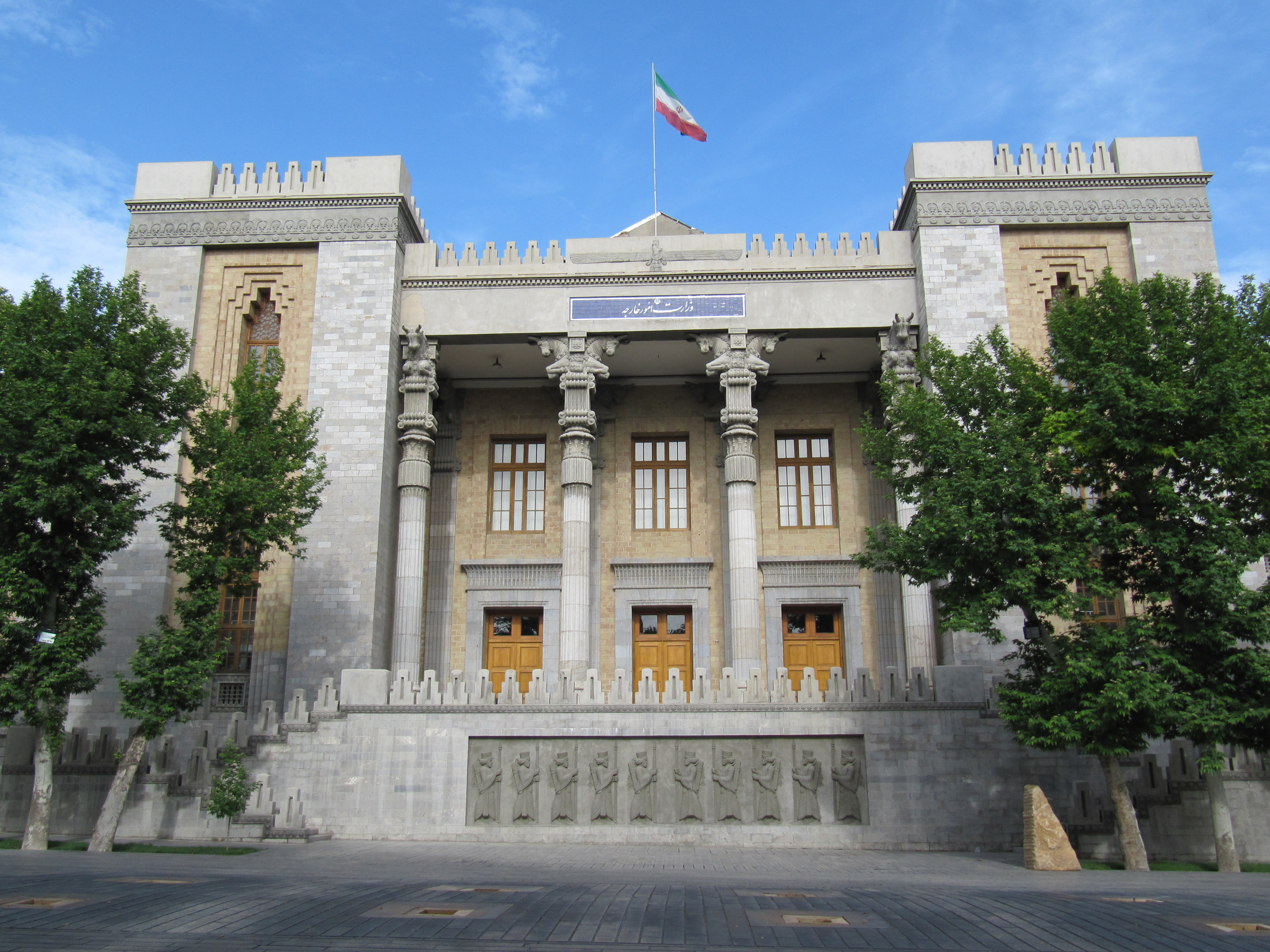
Revivalism: the modern Iranian Ministry of Foreign Affairs, 1939

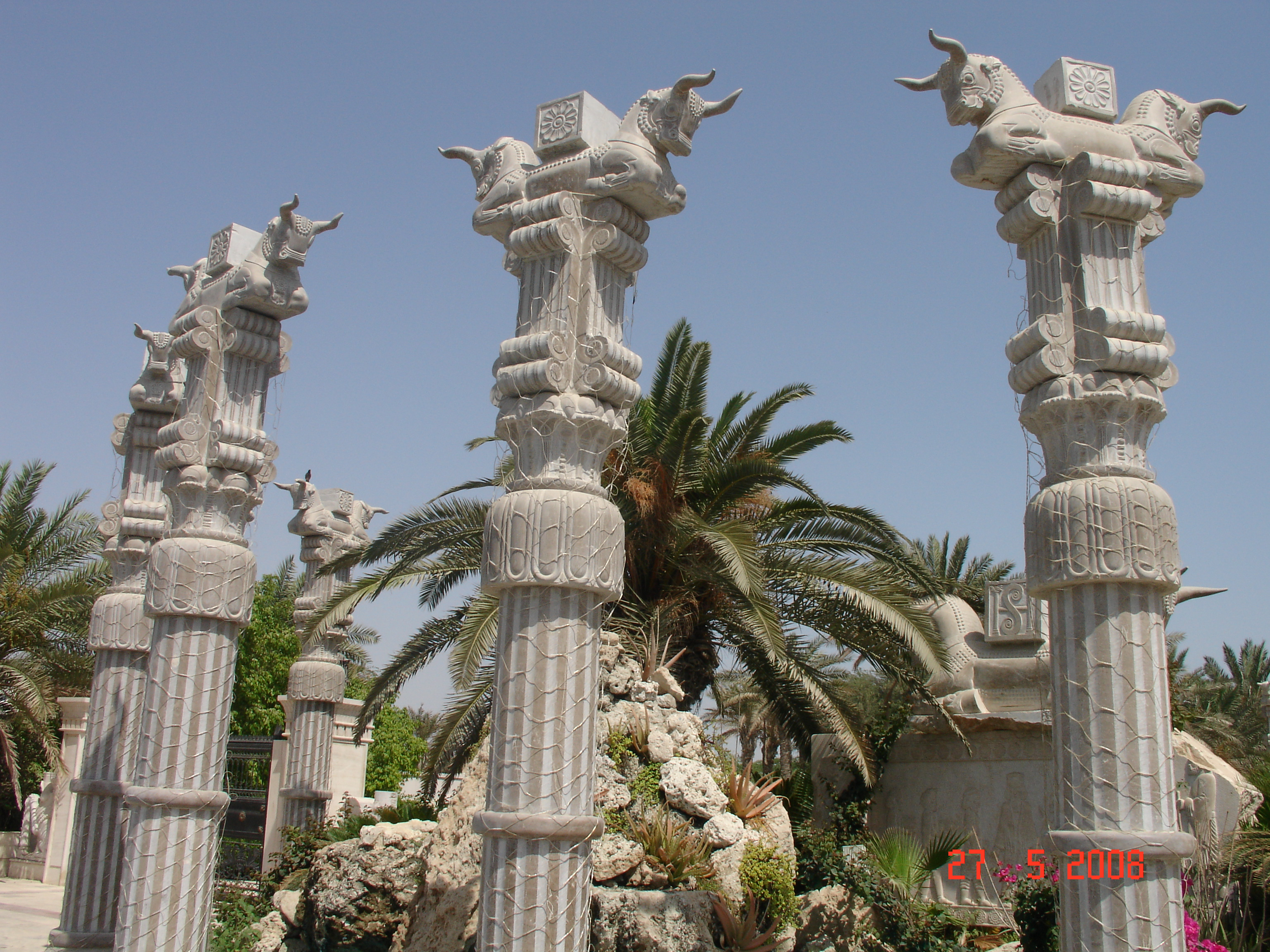
Columns hung with lights, Dariush Grand Hotel, 1999, Kish Island

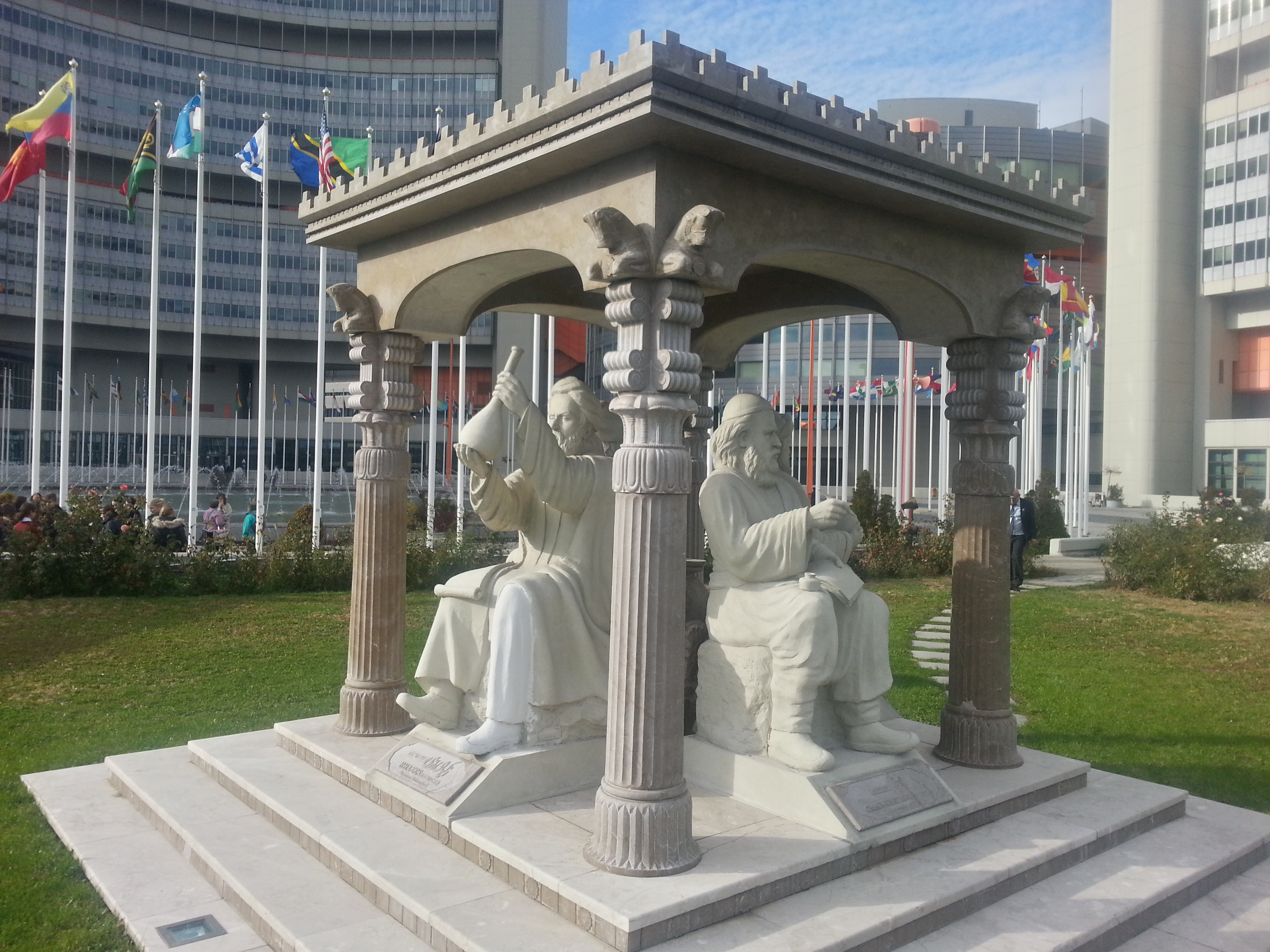
Scholars Pavilion in Vienna, 2009

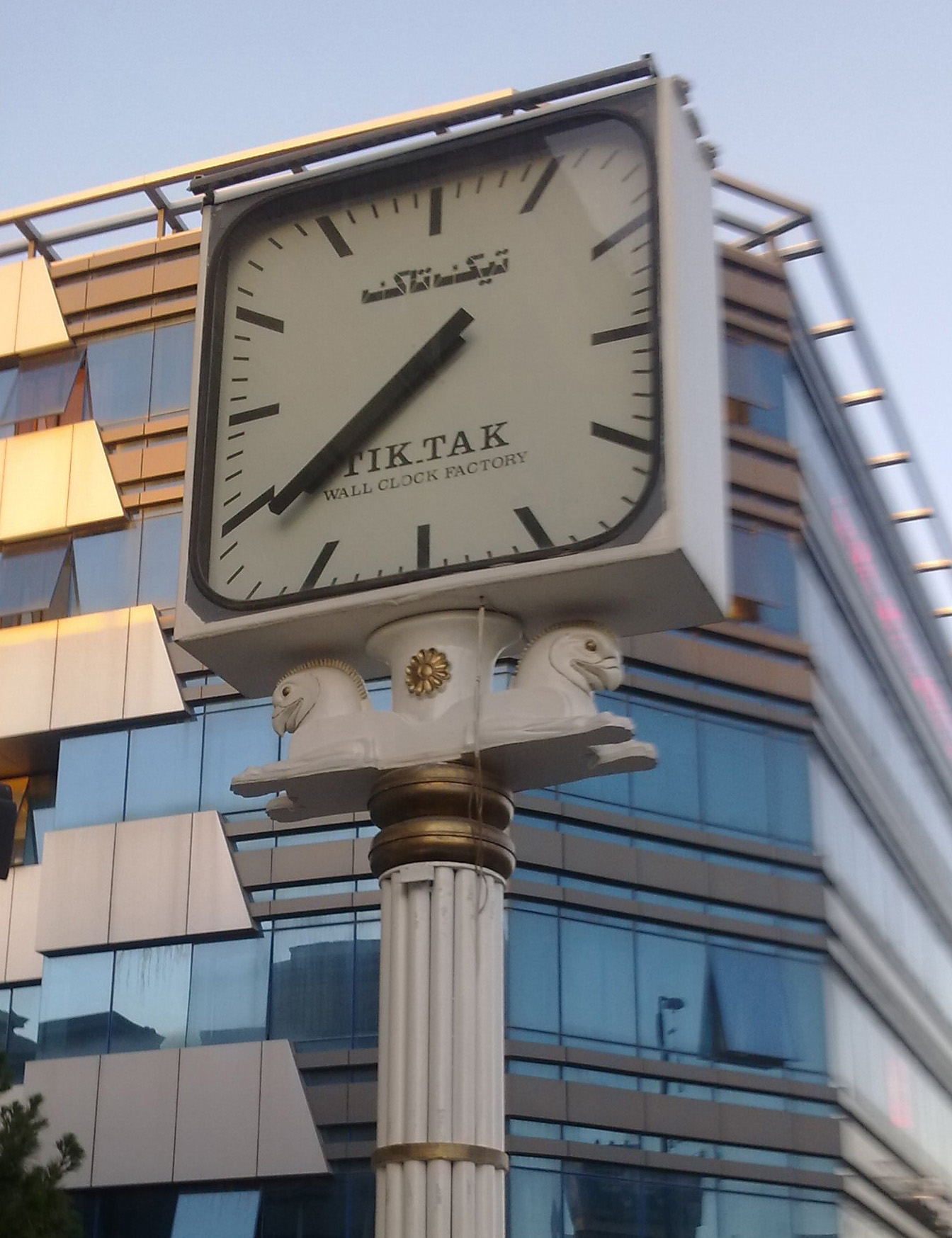
Homa Watch, Mashhad
