= Scholars Pavilion =

Monument at the United Nations Office at Vienna, Austria

Coordinates: 48.23377°N 16.41772°E

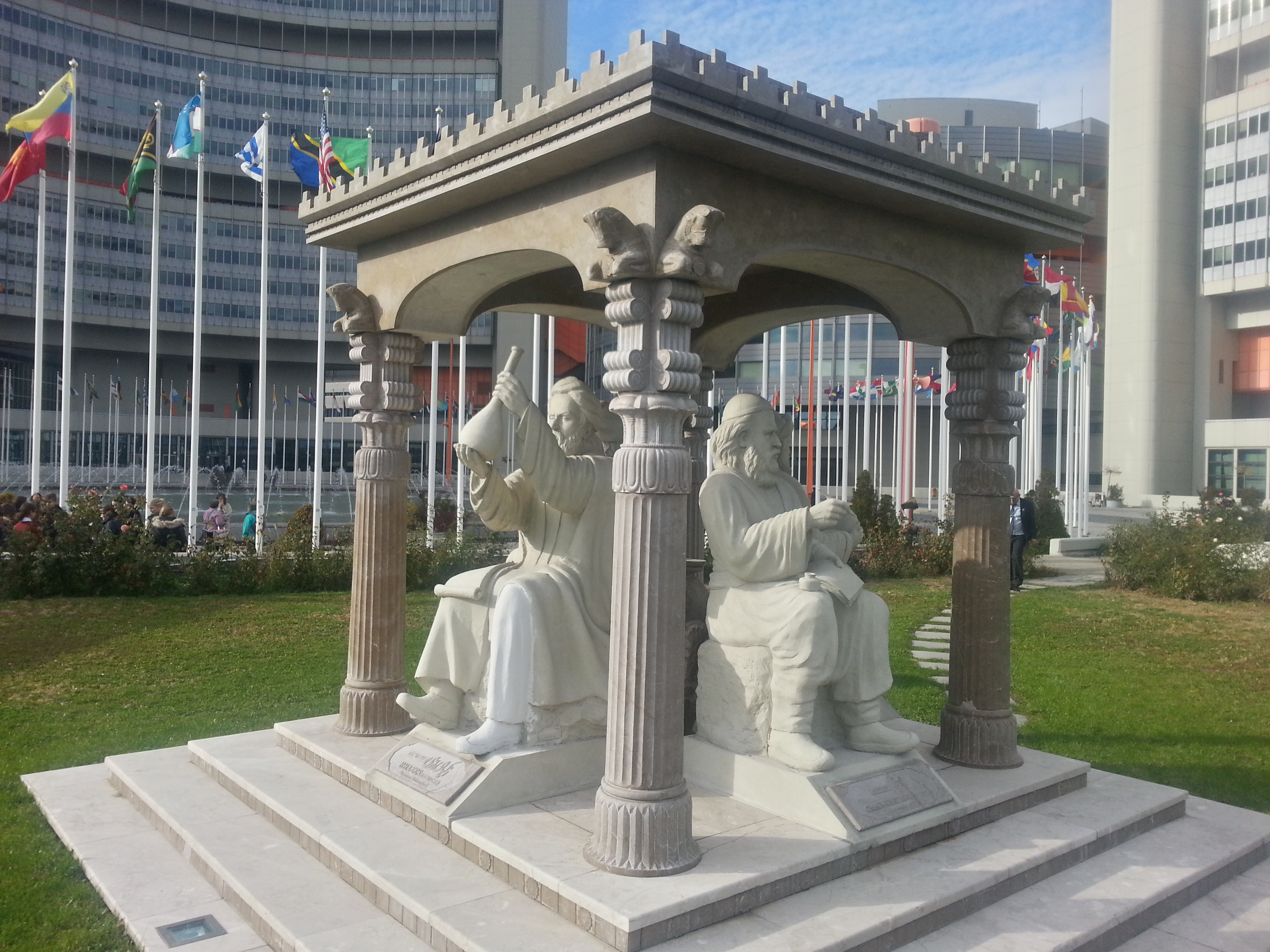
Persian Scholars Pavilion in Vienna

Scholars Pavilion or Scholars Chartagi is a monument donated by the nation of Iran to the United Nations Office at Vienna. The monument architecture is Persian Achaemenid architecture, with Persian columns and other features from Persepolis and other remains from the Achaemenids. The Chahartaq pavilion form runs through Iranian architecture from pre-Islamic times to the present.

Statues of Iranian medieval scholars, Omar Khayyam, Al-Biruni, Rhazes and Avicenna (Ibn-e-Sina or Pour Sina) are inside the pavilion. This monument donated in June 2009 in occasion of Iran's peaceful developments in science. This monument was designed by Alireza Nazem Alroaya and constructed by Sadeh Architecture City Construction.

== Gallery ==
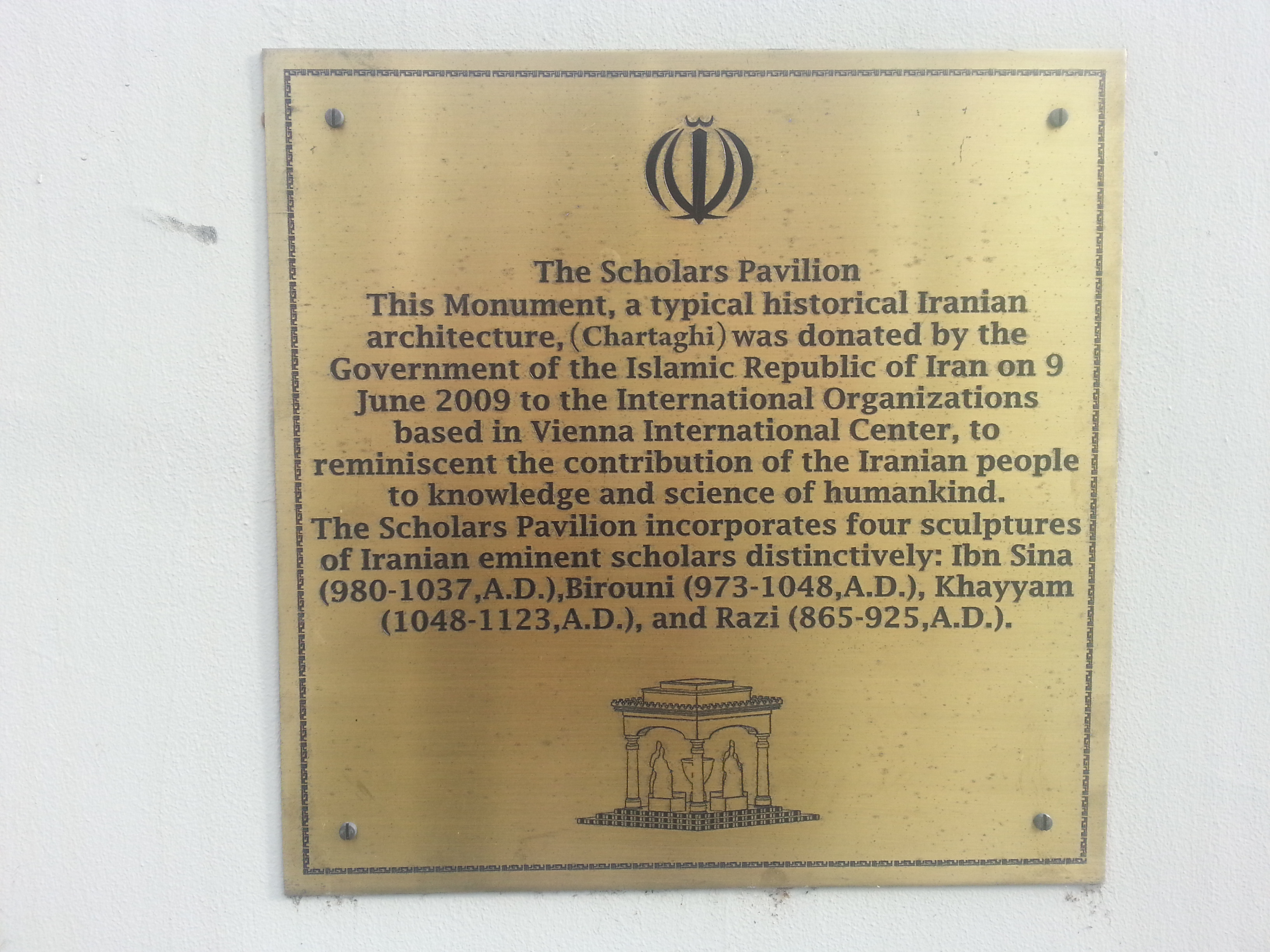

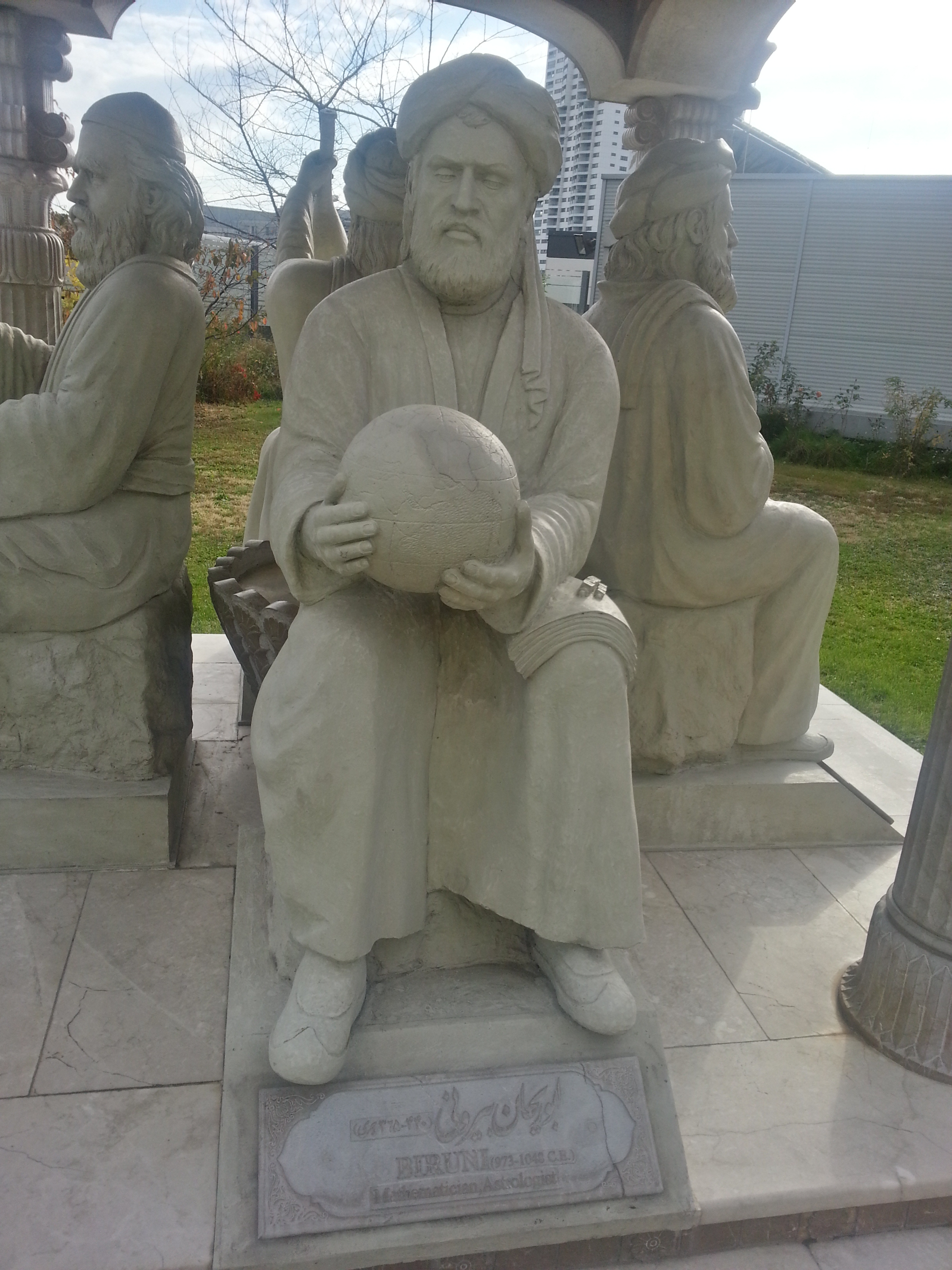
Al-Biruni

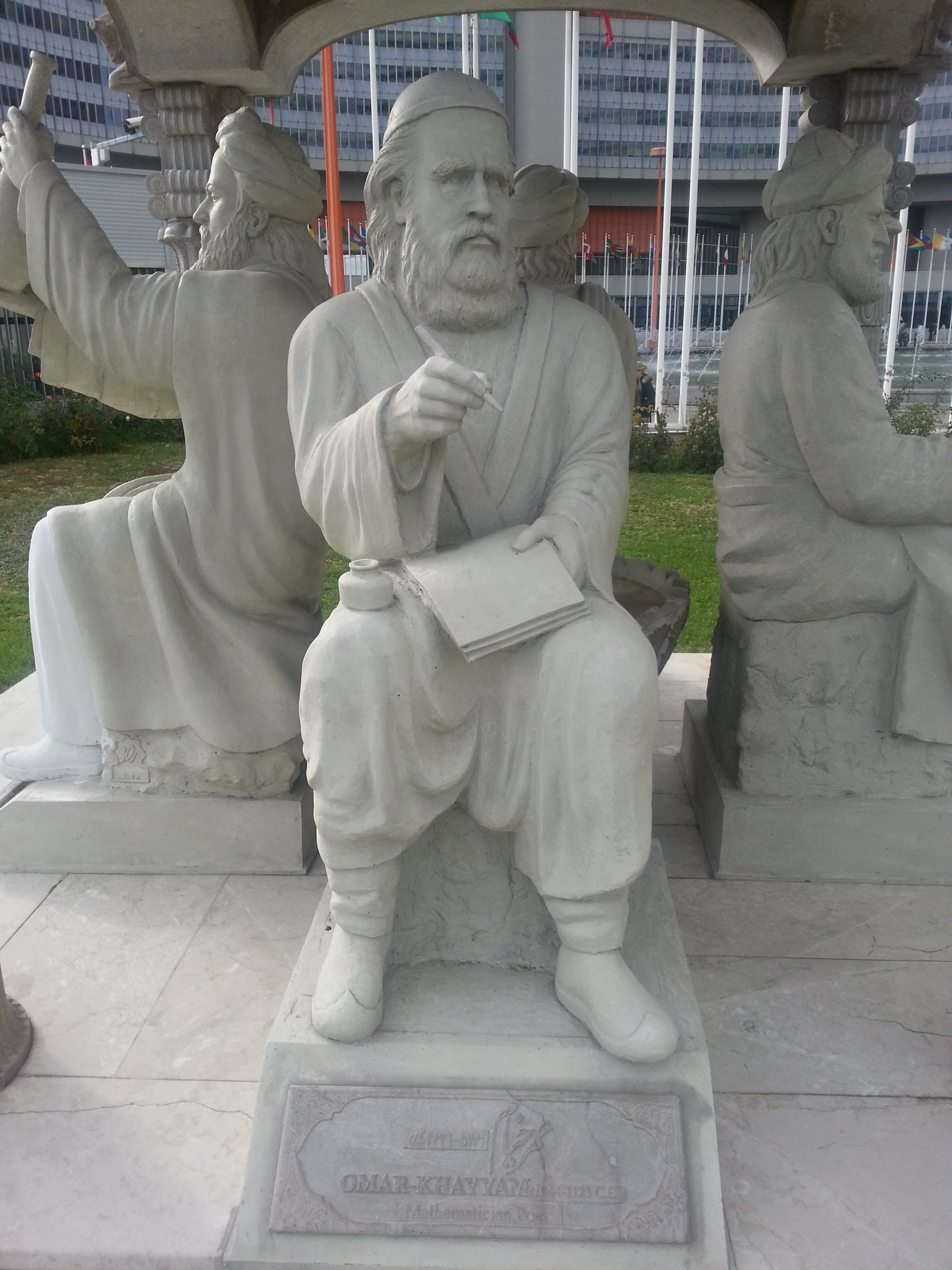
Omar Khayyam

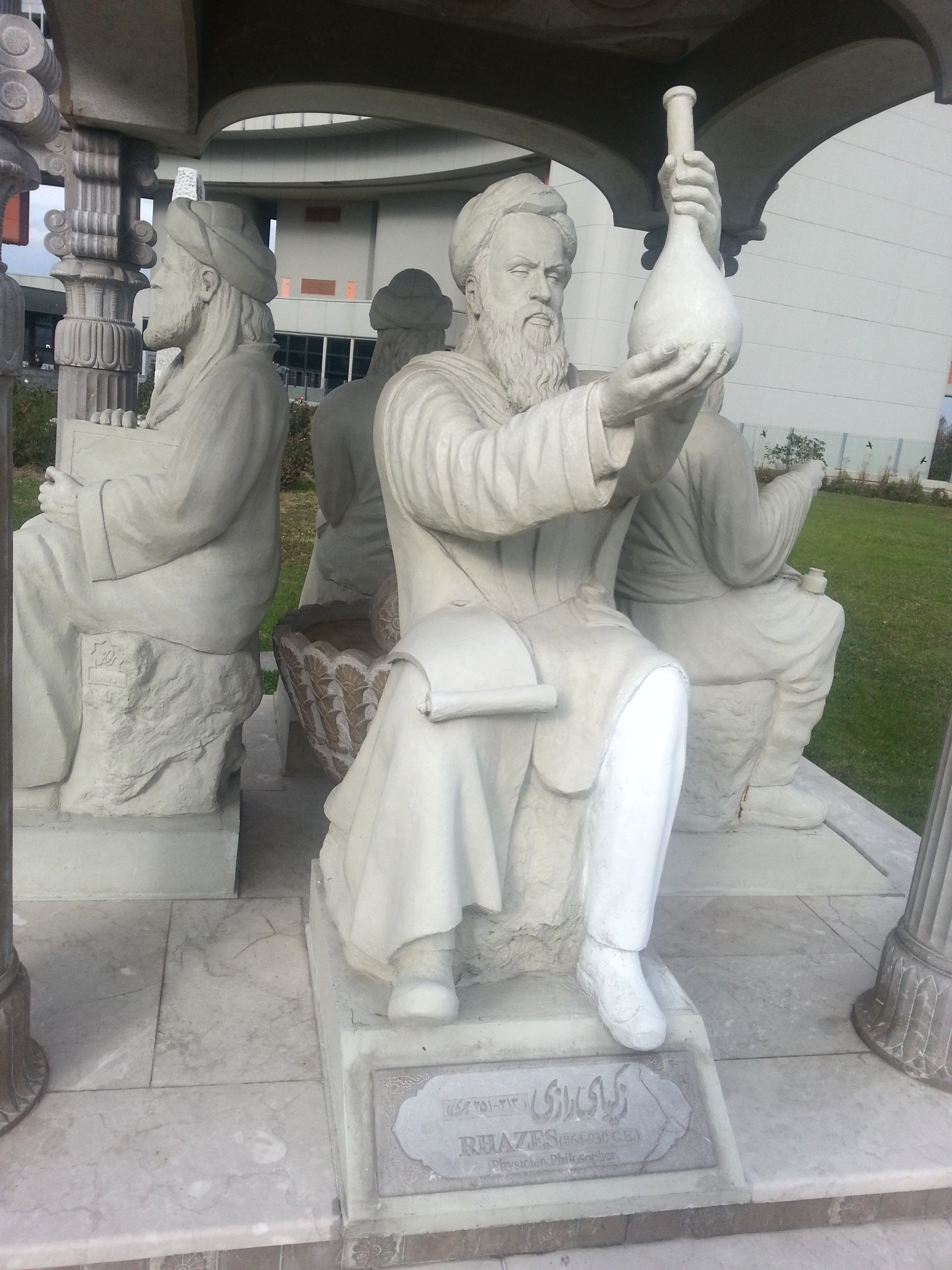
Muhammad ibn Zakariya al-Razi

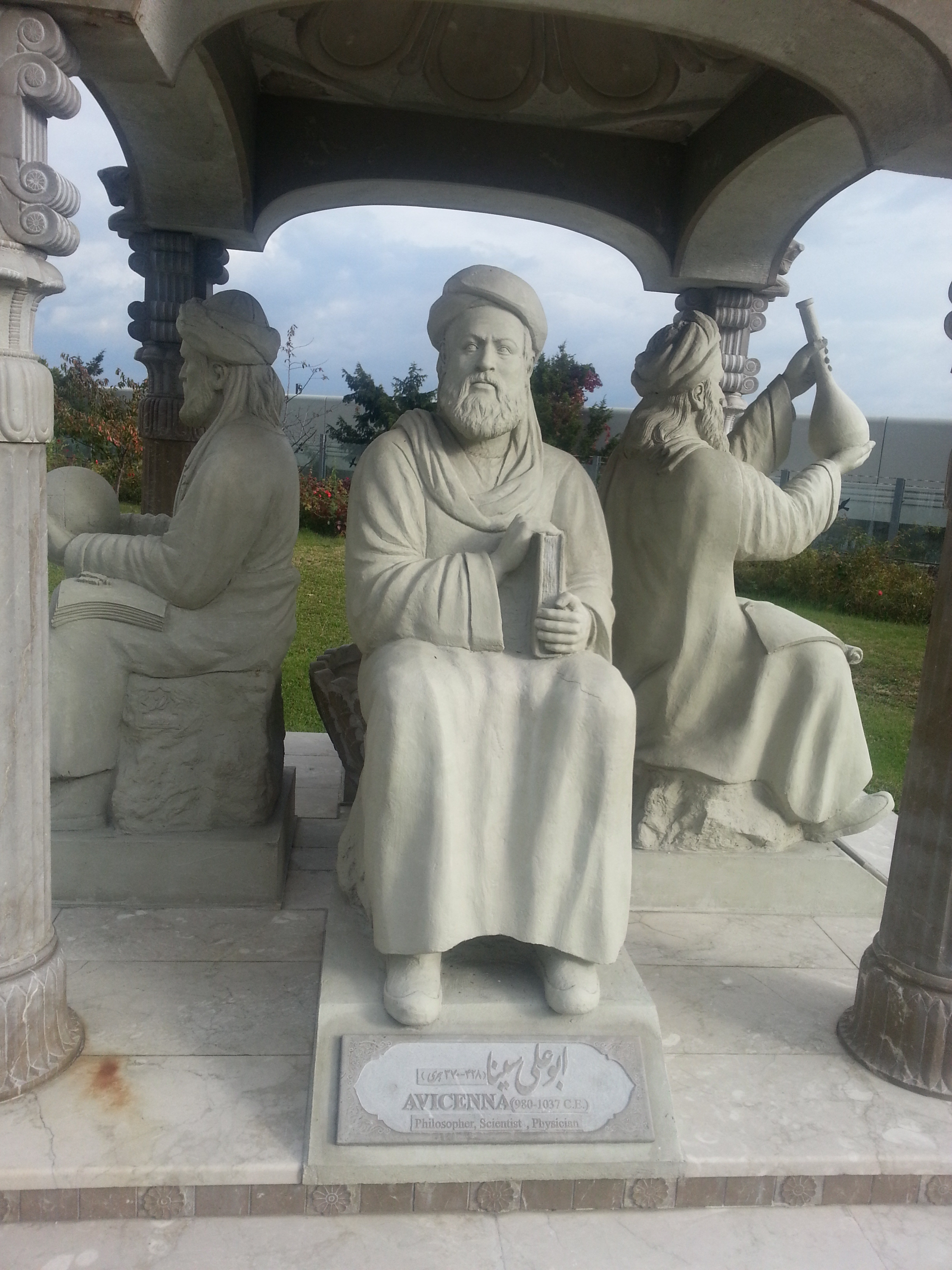
Avicenna
