= Protome =

Decorative head and torso used in ancient ornamentation

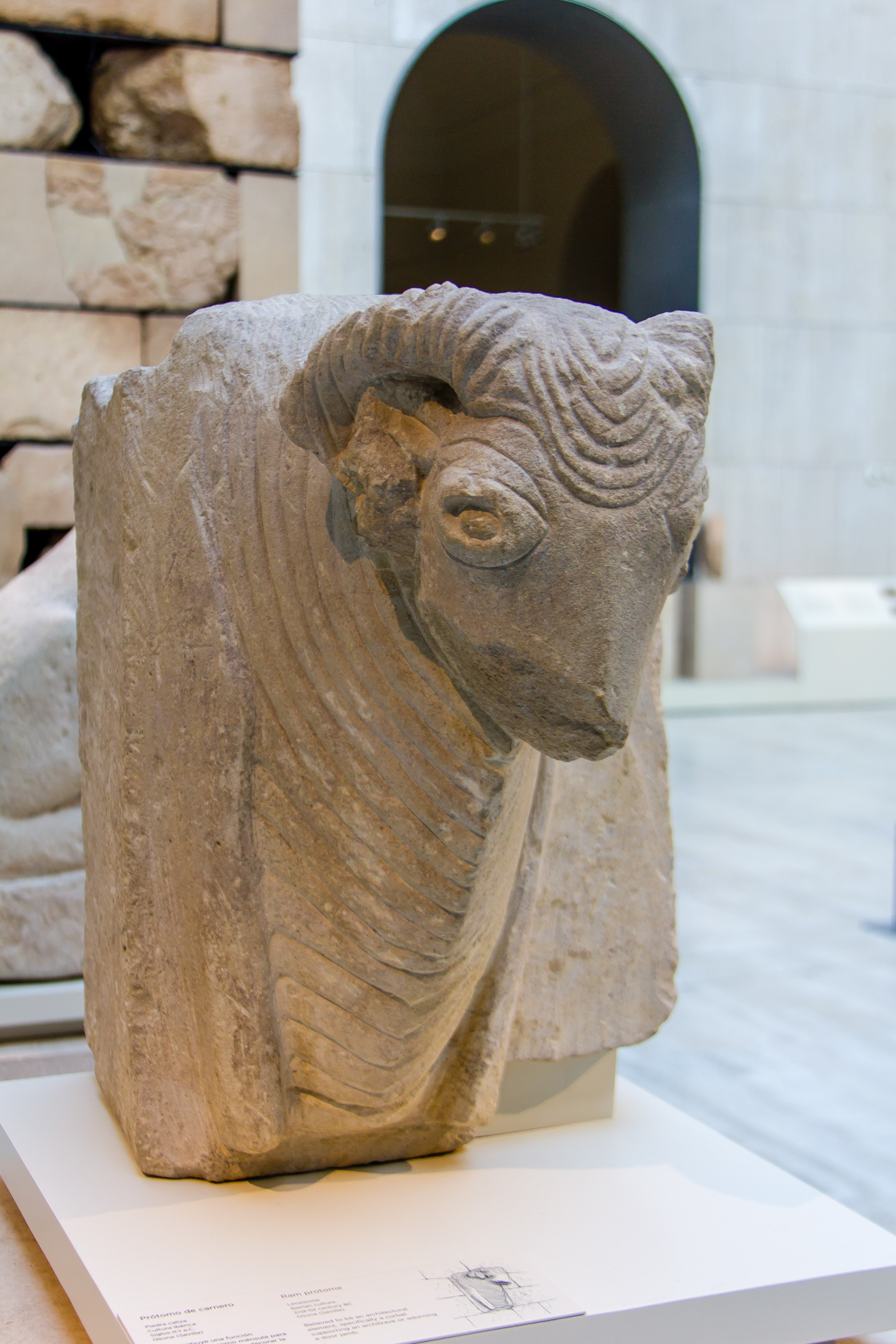
Iberian protome of a ram, from the 3rd or 2nd century BC.

A protome (Greek: προτομή) is a type of adornment that takes the form of the head and upper torso of either a human or an animal.

== History ==
Protomes were often used to decorate ancient Greek architecture, sculpture, and pottery. Protomes were also used in Persian monuments. At Persepolis (ca. 521-465 BCE), an array of stone fluted Persian columns topped by bull protomes distinguish the great hall (apadana) where the king received guests numbering over 10,000. Protomes, combining several different animals are also found at the palace of Darius I, Susa, Iran. At his palace at Susa, pairs of complex protomes feature animals (mythic or real) known to be fierce or intimidating. These function symbolically and structurally: they symbolize power and cosmic balance, but they also support the beams of the ceiling structure. At Susa, the protome capitals form a socket that holds the roof beams in place.

Many Protome are Terracotta mould-made busts of women that were representations of deities in the Greek and Phoenicians cultures, such as Demeter, Astarte or Tanit.

In the Archaic Greek style, they were often wearing stephane (diadem) and veil. The outline of the face is round and full, with long pointed oval almond shaped (archaic style) eyes placed at an angle.

They can be found in many museums around the world including the Metropolitan Museum of Art, the British Museum, the Louvre, the Museum of Fine Arts (Budapest), the museum of the British School at Athens and the Museo Arqueológico de Ibiza y Formentera in Ibiza.
