= Afif-Abad Garden =

Museum complex in Shiraz, Iran

Coordinates: 29°37′23.38″N 52°29′54.1″E

- باغ عفیف آباد
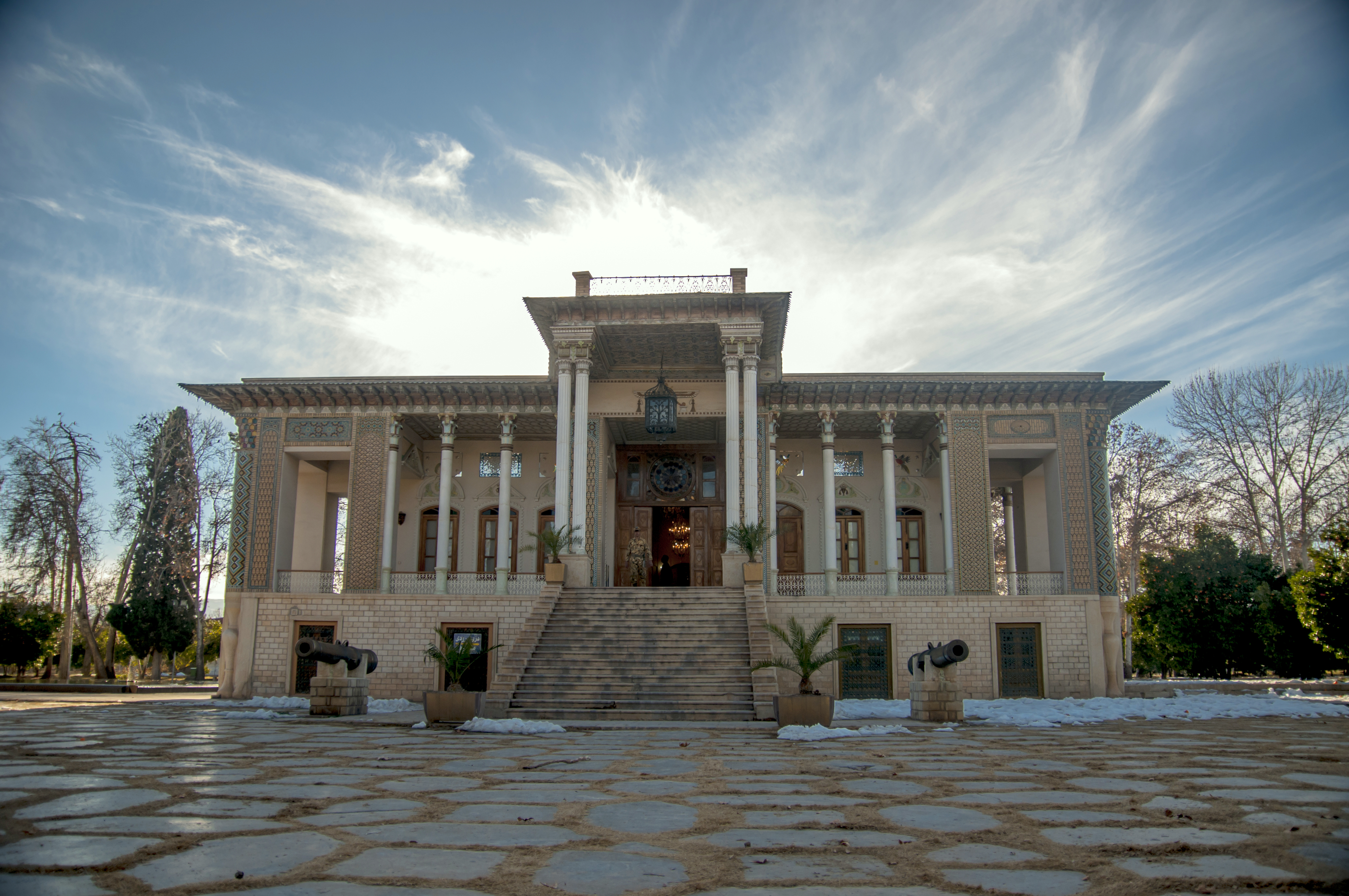
- Royal Palace of the Golshan Garden
- Established: 1863
- Location: Shiraz, Iran
- Type: Persian Garden
- Owner: Iranian Army

Afif-Abad Garden (Persian: باغ عفیف آباد, romanized: Bāq-e Afif-Ābād), originally the Gulshan Garden (Persian: باغ گلشن, romanized: Bāq-e Gulshan), is a museum complex in Shiraz, Iran.

== History ==
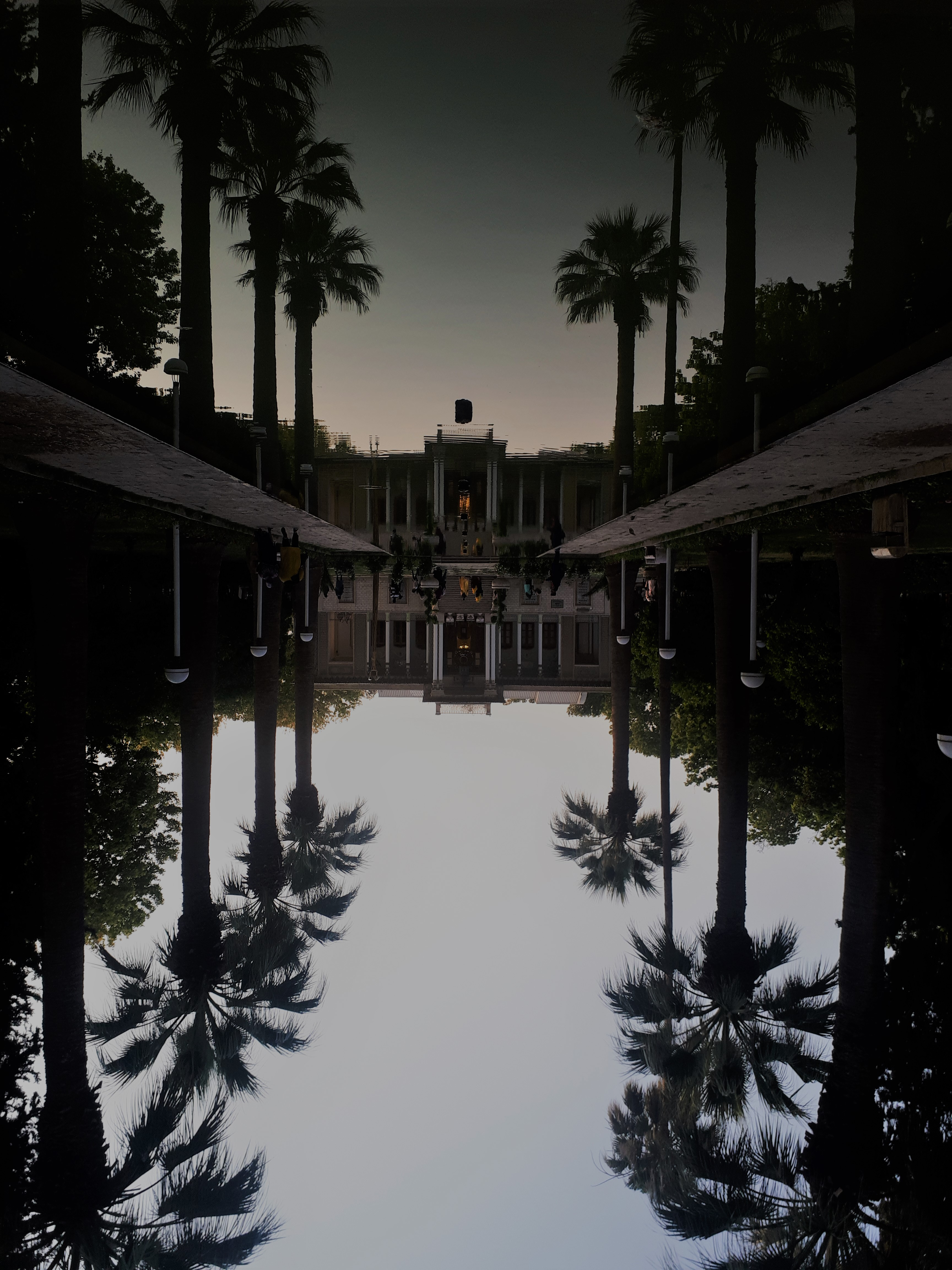
Reflection of Afif-Abad mansion in the central howz

In 1962, it was restored by the army. It now functions as a weapons museum.

== Gallery ==
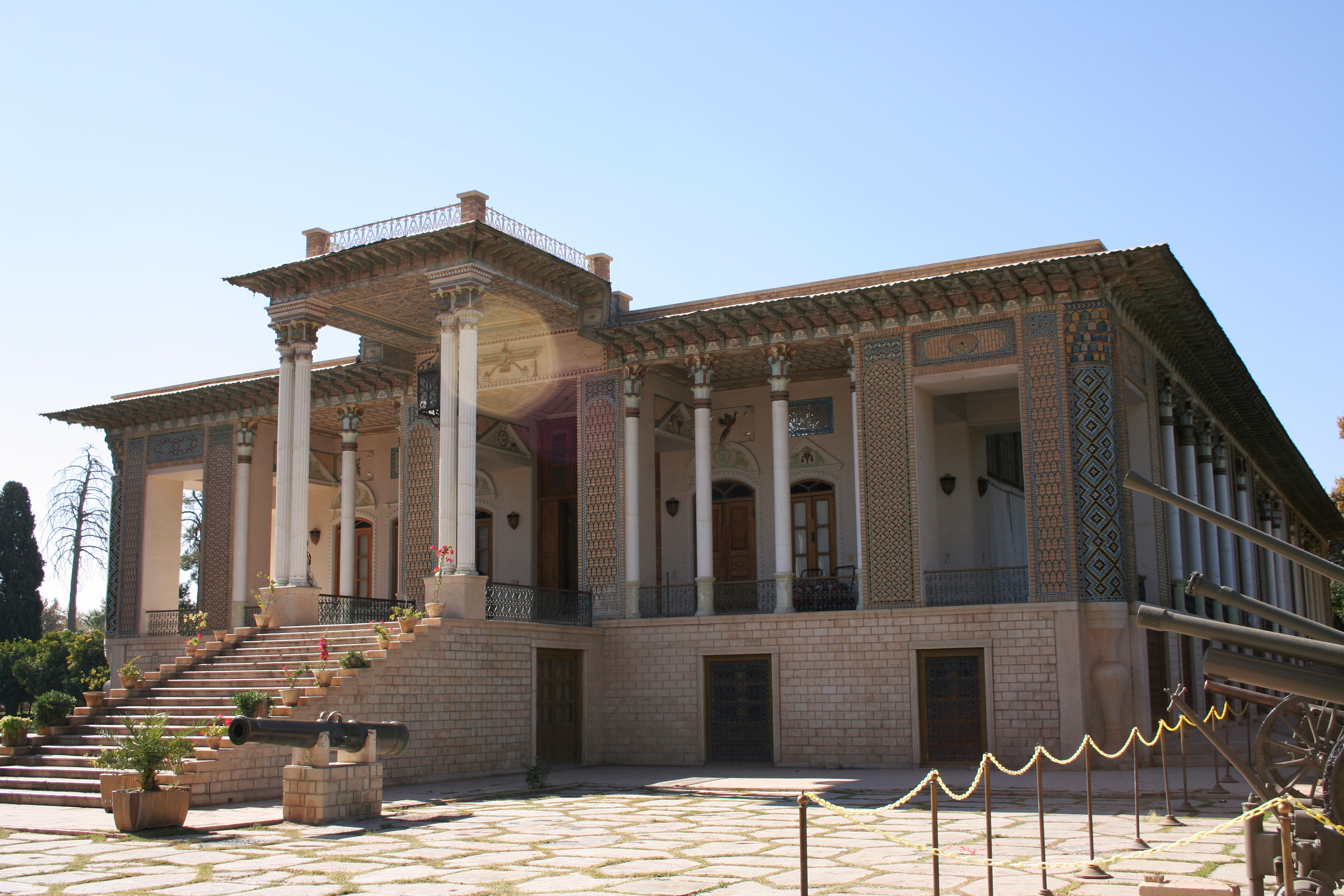
Exterior view of the mansion

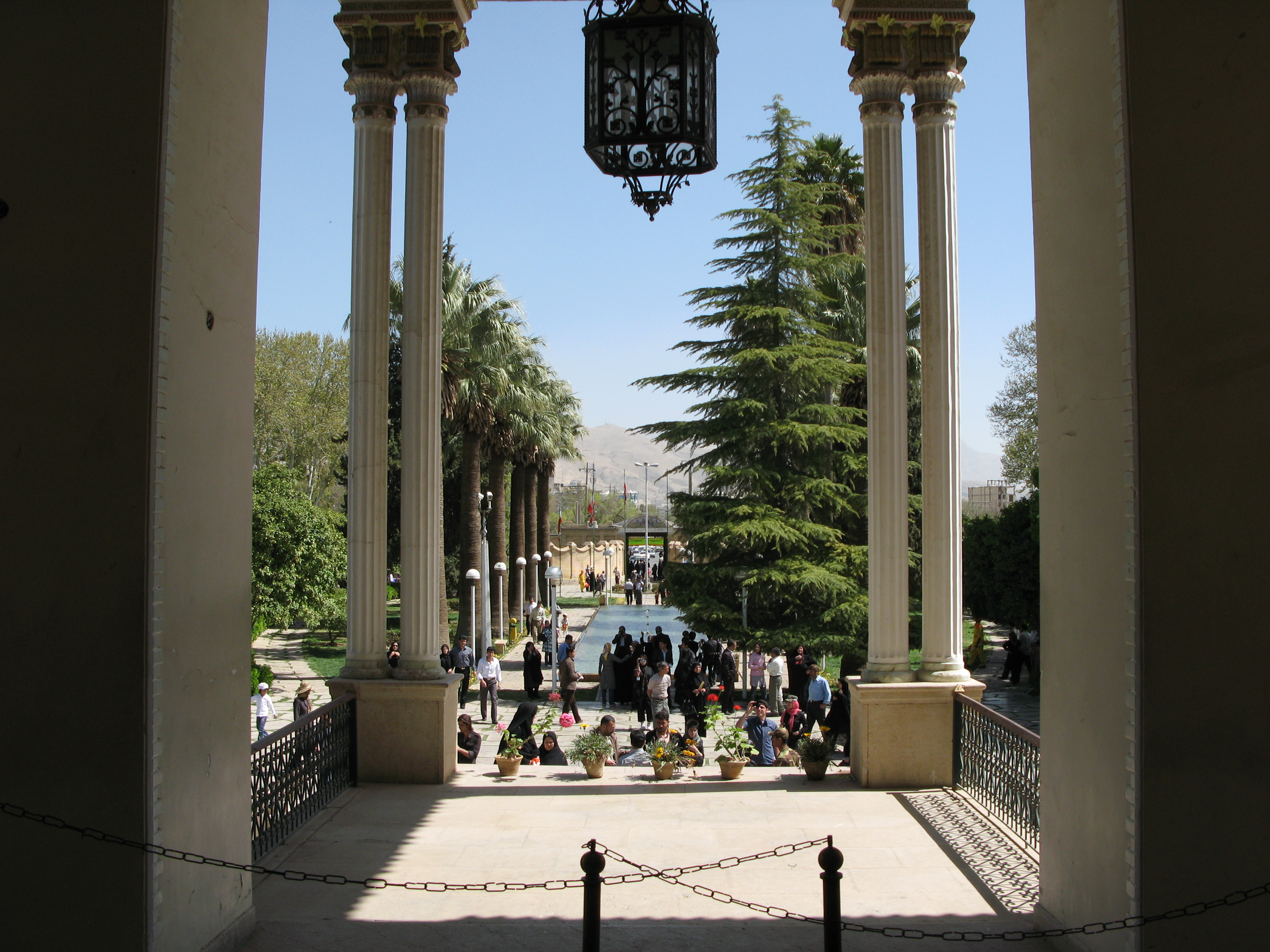
View from the entrance

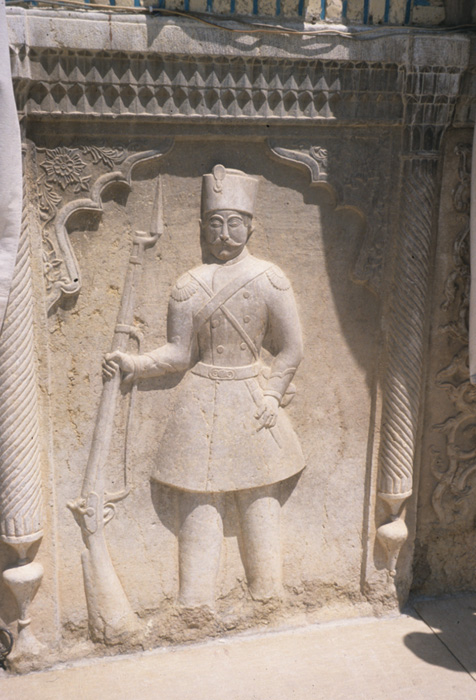
A relief of a Qajar soldier on one of the walls of the mansion

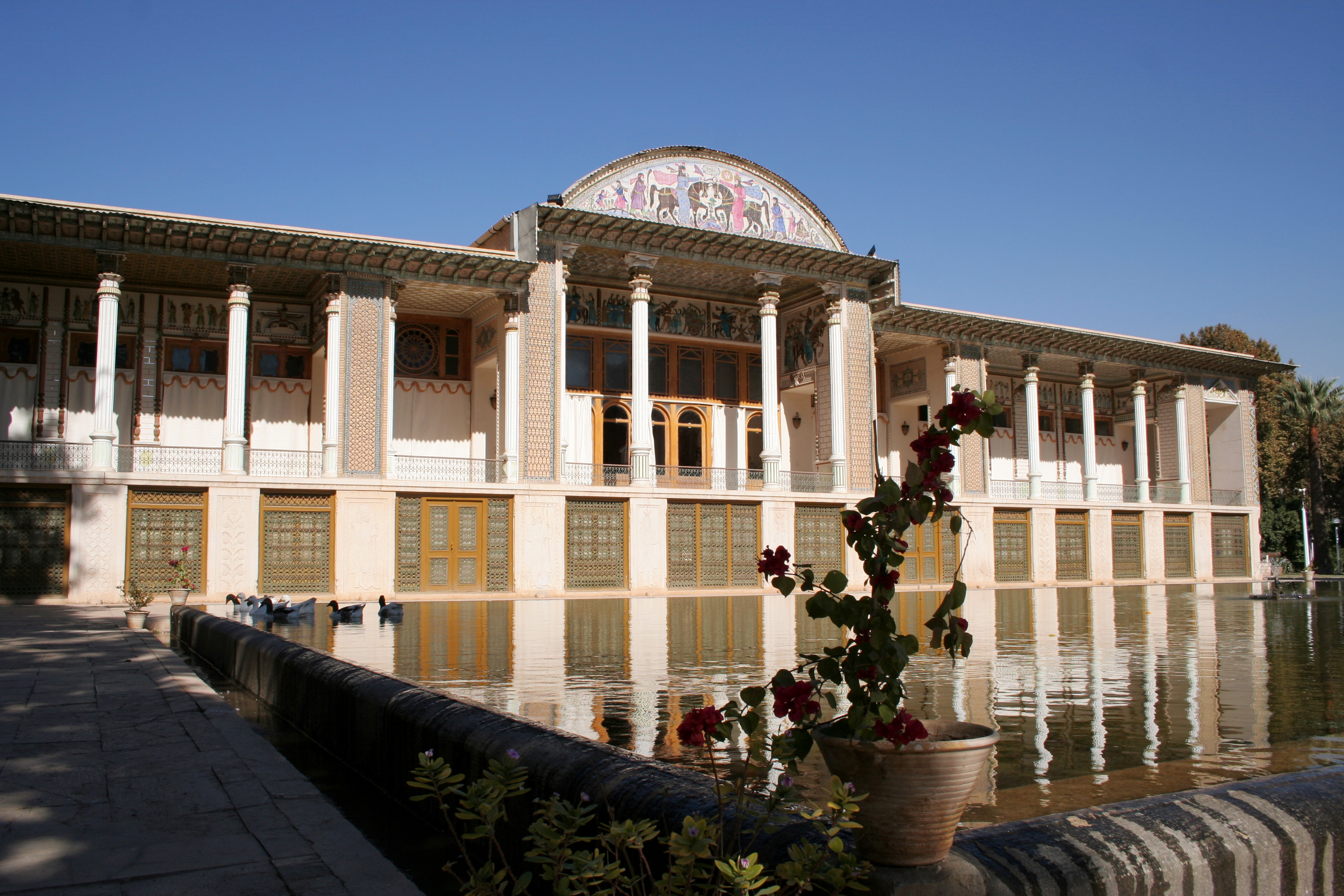
View of the garden and mansion

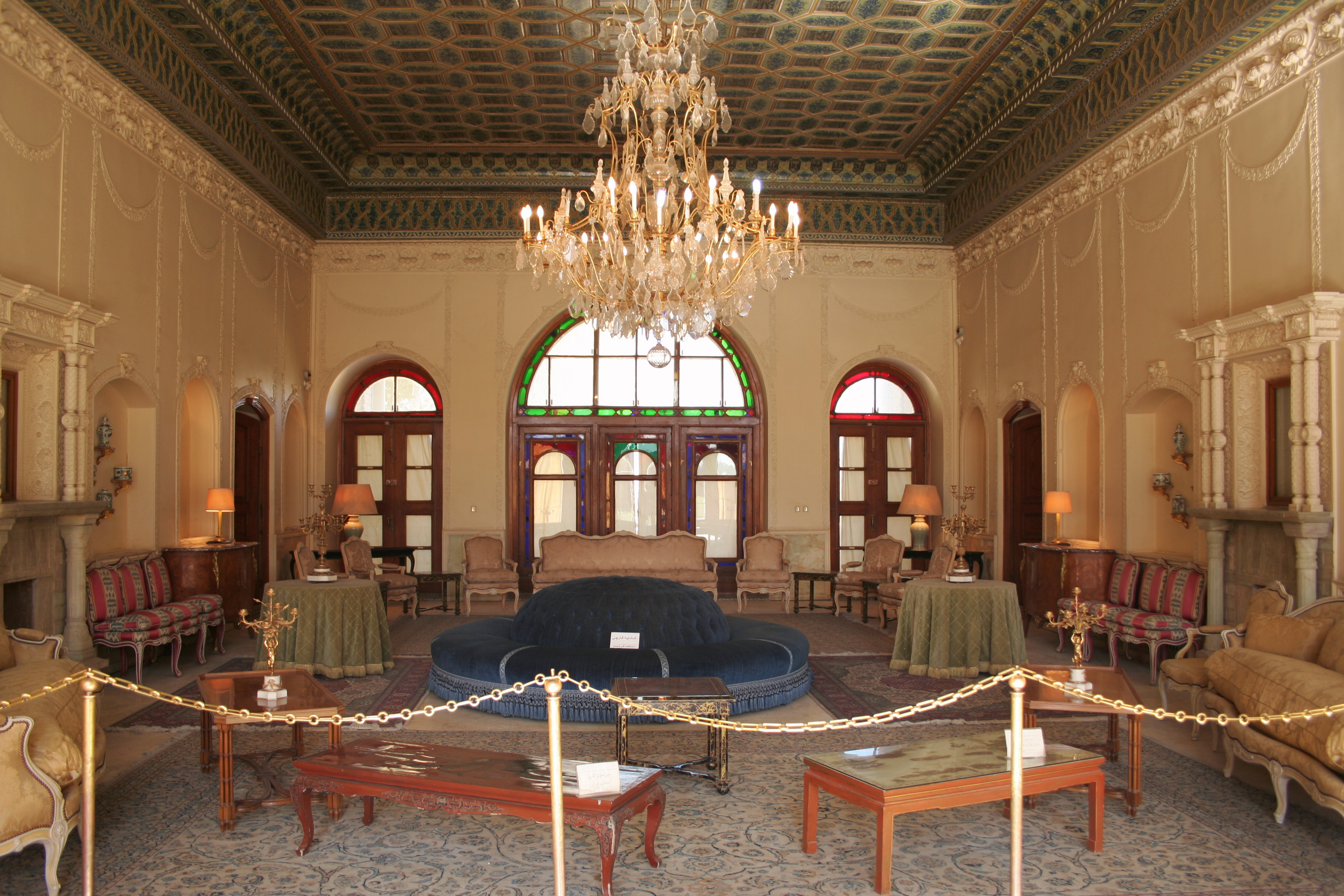
Interior of the mansion

== See also ==
- Persian garden
- Persian architecture
