= Palace of Darius in Susa =

Achaemenid-era palace complex in Susa, Iran

- کاخ داریوش در شوش (Persian)
- Susa Palace
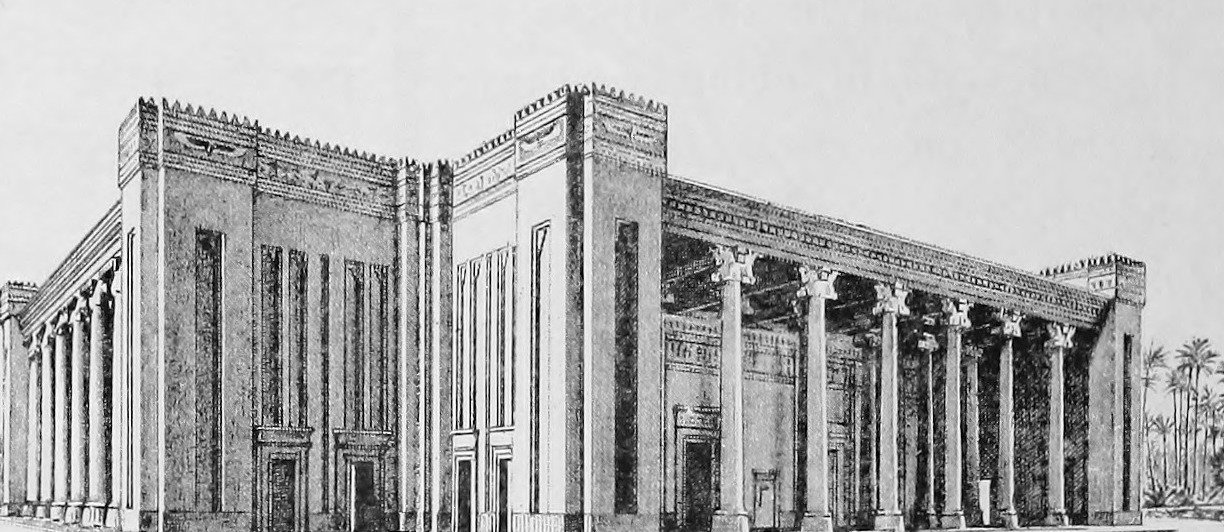
- Reconstruction drawing of the Apadana of Susa

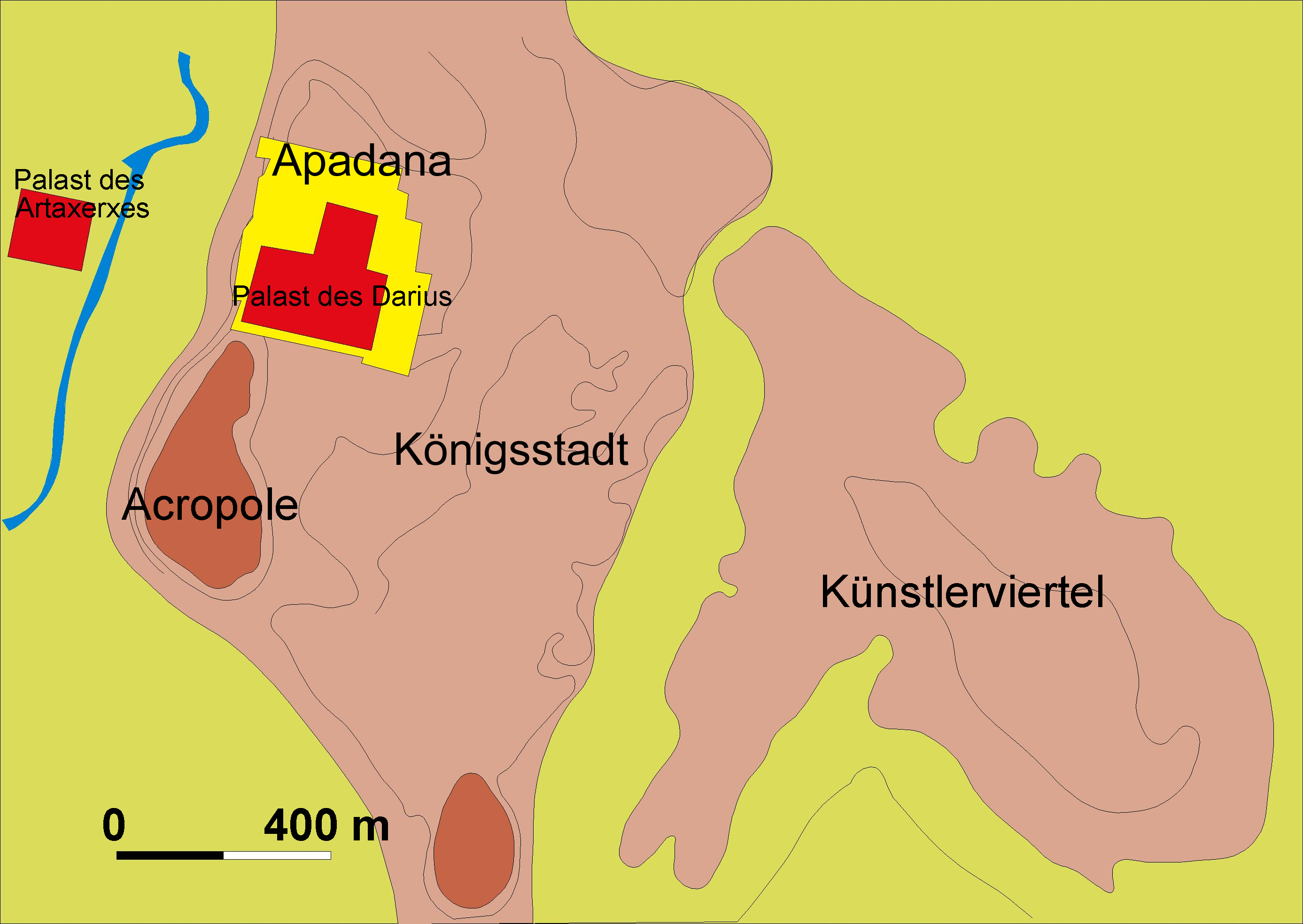

- Location of the ancient city of Susa within Iran
- 32.1921°N 48.2487°E
- Type: Palace
- Periods: Axial Age
- Cultures: Persian
- Location: Susa (near modern-day Shush), Khuzestan Province, Iran

History
- Built: 6th century BCE
- Built by: Darius I, Xerxes I, Artaxerxes I, Darius II, Artaxerxes II

Site notes
- Material: stone, mud-brick, wood
- Architectural style: Achaemenid
- Archaeologists: Jean Perrot, etc.
- Condition: Ruined
- Management: Cultural Heritage, Handicrafts and Tourism Organization of Iran

The Palace of Darius in Susa was a palace complex that was built at the site of Susa, Iran, during the reign of Darius I over the Achaemenid Empire. The construction was conducted parallel to that of Persepolis. Manpower and raw materials from various parts of the Achaemenid Empire contributed to its construction. It was once destroyed by fire and was partially restored later; little has remained from the complex, which is today part of an archaeological site.

== History ==
The palace complex was constructed by the Achaemenid king Darius I in Susa, his favorite capital. Construction works continued under Darius I's son, Xerxes, and to a lesser extent, Artaxerxes I (465–424 BC) and Darius II (423–404 BC). Artaxerxes II (404–358 BC) partially restored the palace as it was destroyed by a fire during the reign of Artaxerxes I fifty years earlier. The palace was captured and plundered by the invading Macedonians under Alexander the Great in December 330 BC.

The site of the palace has been greatly damaged since the 1930s, including by urban development, erosion of the walls, illegal excavations, and Iraqi bombardment during the 1974–75 Shatt al-Arab conflict.

== Construction ==
Construction was carried out at Susa parallel to those at Persepolis. Built on an artificially raised platform 15 metres (49 ft) high, covering 100 hectares (250 acres), the complex at Susa consists of a residential palace, an apadana (audience hall), and a monumental gate. A covered passage ("Propylaeum") faces these structures. The apadana at Susa is similar to that of Persepolis, using the distinctive Persian column, topped by two bulls, which was probably developed here.

Sources describing Achaemenid-era Susa are rare. The Achaemenid constructions at Susa are mostly known through the royal inscriptions, which are mostly trilingual—in Old Persian, Elamite, and Babylonian. Unlike the massive number of clay tablets found in Persepolis, only few clay tablets have been found in Susa, despite its important political and economic situation.

According to Gene R. Garthwaite, the Susa Palace served as Darius' model for Persepolis. Comparing the palace to that of Pasargadae, the former Achaemenid capital, he argues that Susa even more represented Achaemenid simultaneous rulership, and "what was symbolic was actualized", such that Darius's rule "could command craftsmen and material from the breadth of the empire" to build the monument, as is described in Darius' "charter of foundation" of the palace (or the DSf inscription), which enumerates the workers and the material used:

This palace which I built at Susa, from afar its ornamentation was brought. Downward the earth was dug, until I reached rock in the earth. When the excavation had been made, then rubble was packed down, some 40 cubits in depth, another (part) 20 cubits in depth. On that rubble the palace was constructed.

And that the earth was dug downward, and that the rubble was packed down, and that the sun-dried brick was molded, the Babylonian people -- it did (these tasks).

The cedar timber, this -- a mountain named Lebanon -- from there was brought. The Assyrian people, it brought it to Babylon; from Babylon the Carians and the Ionians brought it to Susa. The yakâ-timber was brought from Gandara and from Carmania.

The gold was brought from Sardis and from Bactria, which here was wrought. The precious stone lapis lazuli and carnelian which was wrought here, this was brought from Sogdiana. The precious stone turquoise, this was brought from Chorasmia, which was wrought here.

The silver and the ebony were brought from Egypt. The ornamentation with which the wall was adorned, that from Ionia was brought. The ivory which was wrought here, was brought from Ethiopia [Nubia] and from Sind and from Arachosia.

The stone columns which were here wrought, a village named Abiradu, in Elam -- from there were brought. The stone-cutters who wrought the stone, those were Ionians and Sardians.

The goldsmiths who wrought the gold, those were Medes and Egyptians. The men who wrought the wood, those were Sardians and Egyptians. The men who wrought the baked brick, those were Babylonians. The men who adorned the wall, those were Medes and Egyptians.

Darius the King says: At Susa a very excellent (work) was ordered, a very excellent (work) was (brought to completion). Me may Ahuramazda protect, and Hystaspes my father, and my country.

— Darius I, DSf inscription

== Gallery ==
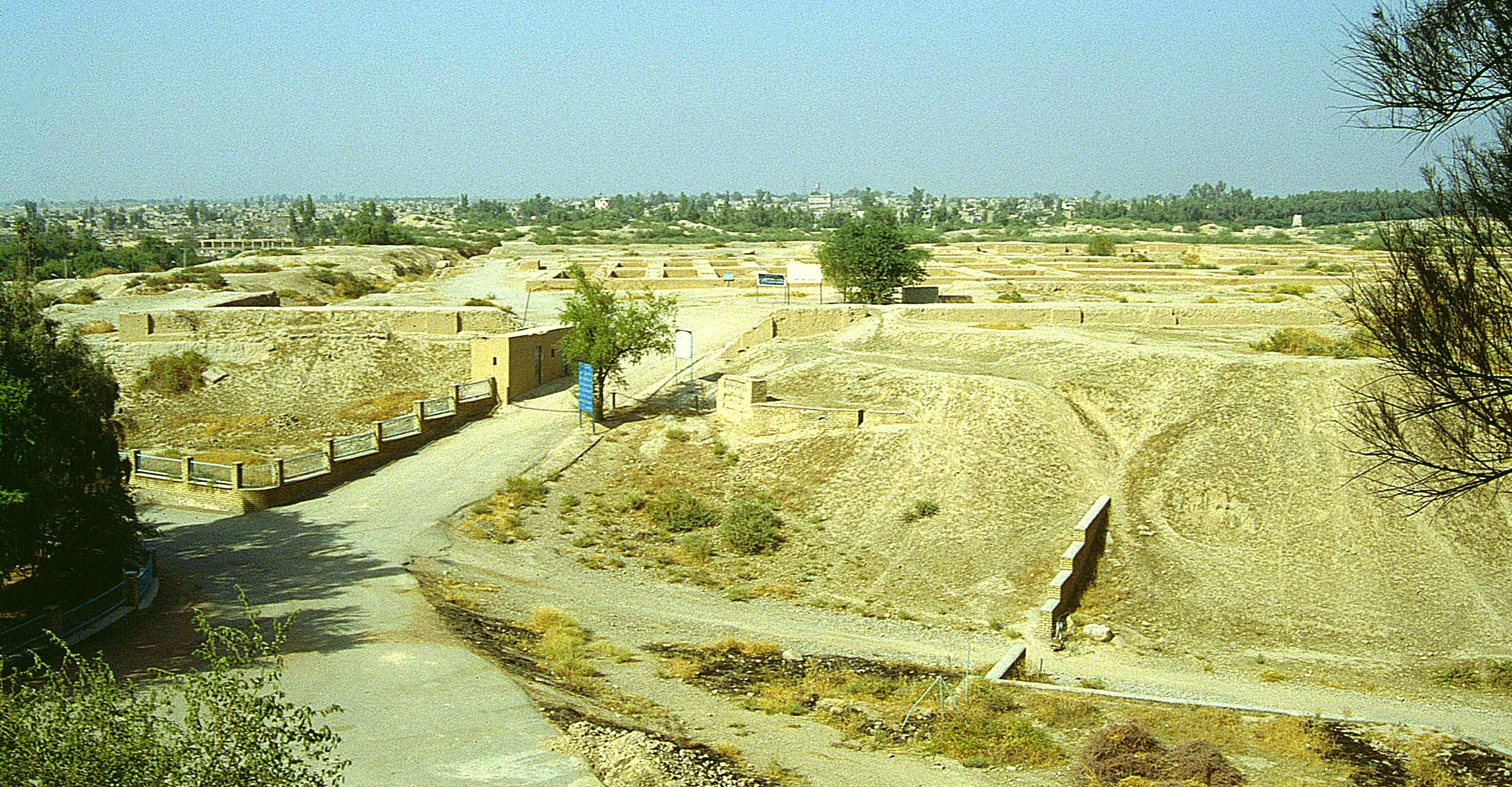
Site of the palace

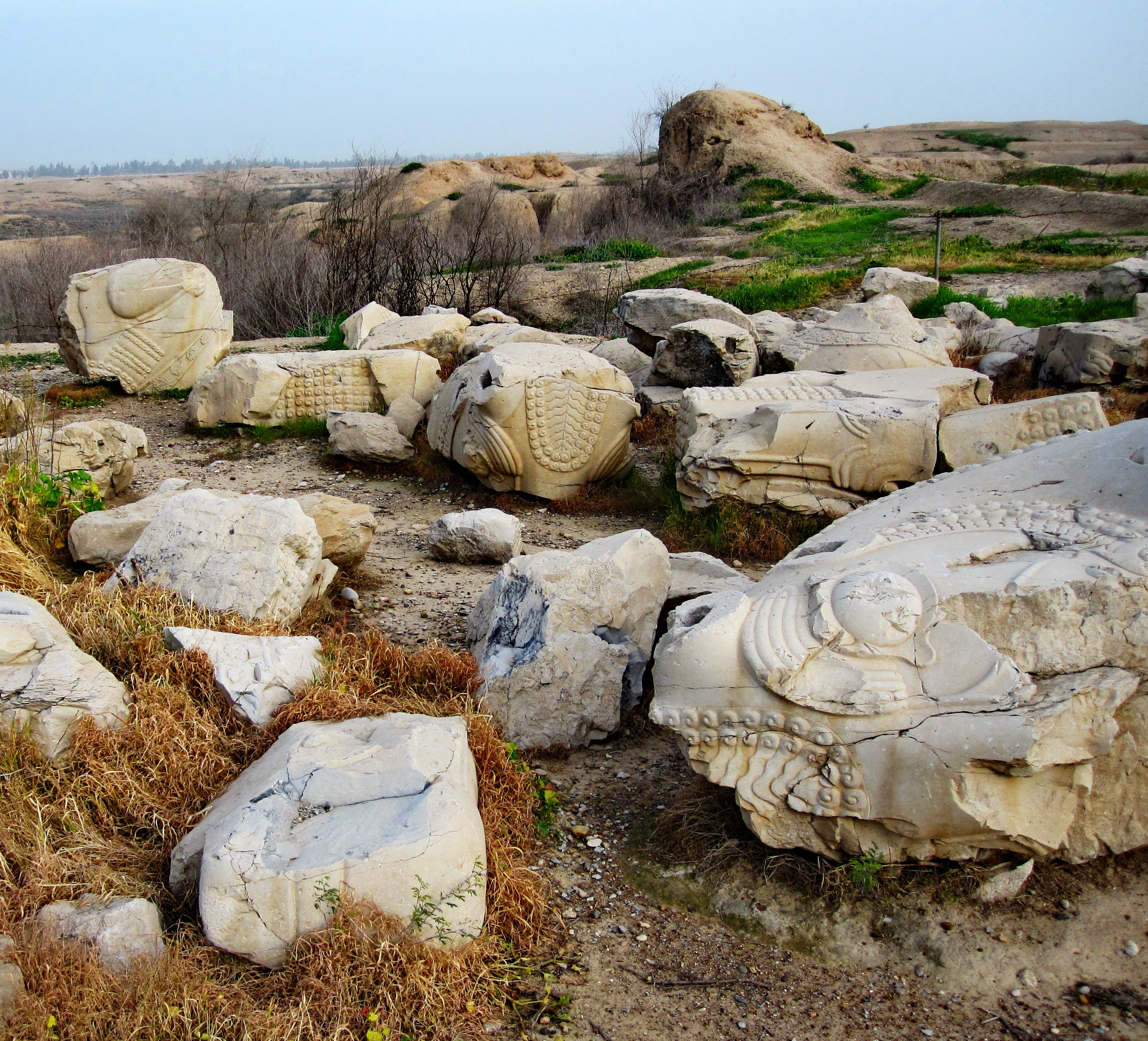
Ruins of the Apadana of Susa

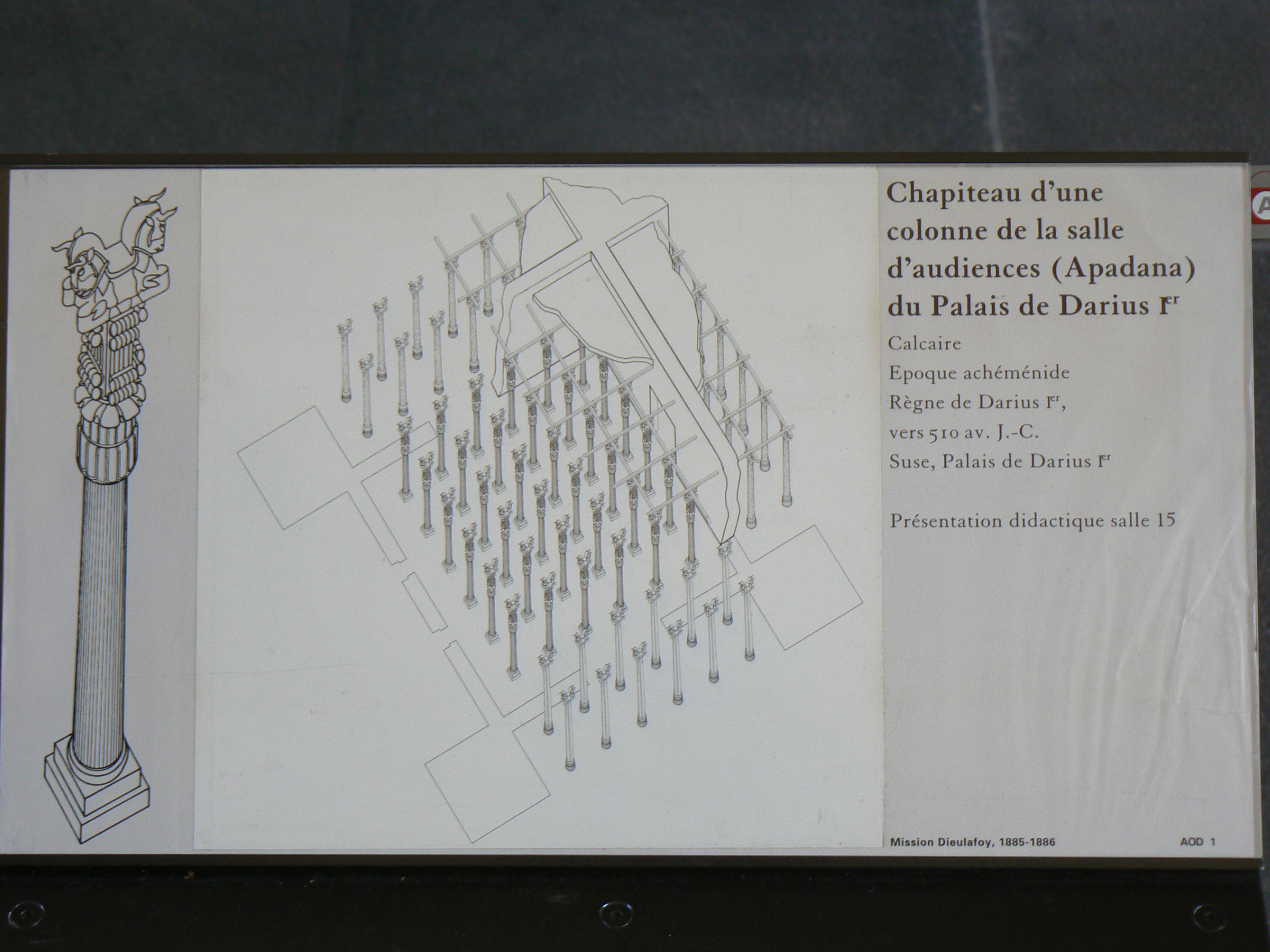
Reconstruction drawing of the Apadana of the Susa Palace

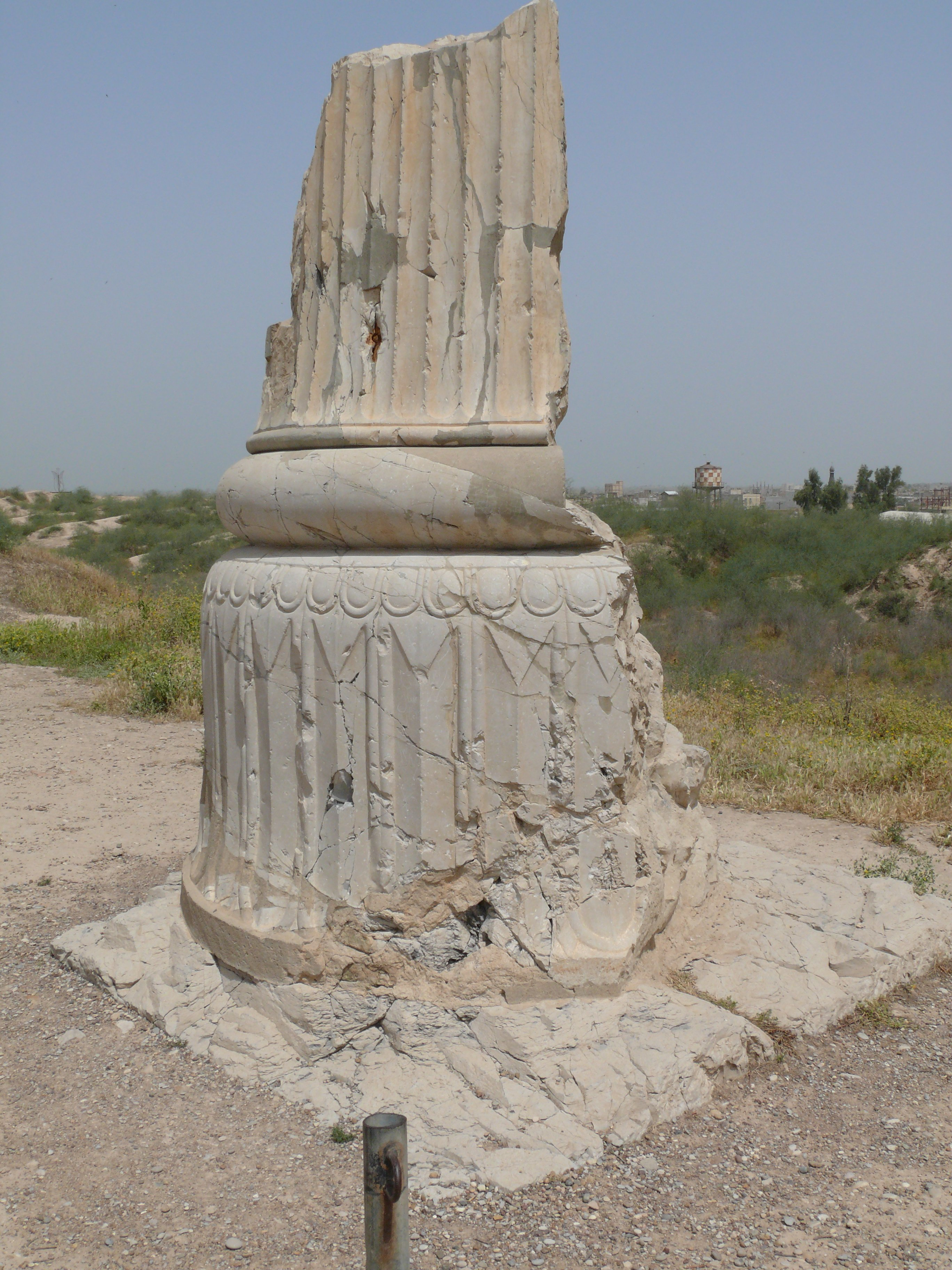
Remains of a Persian column

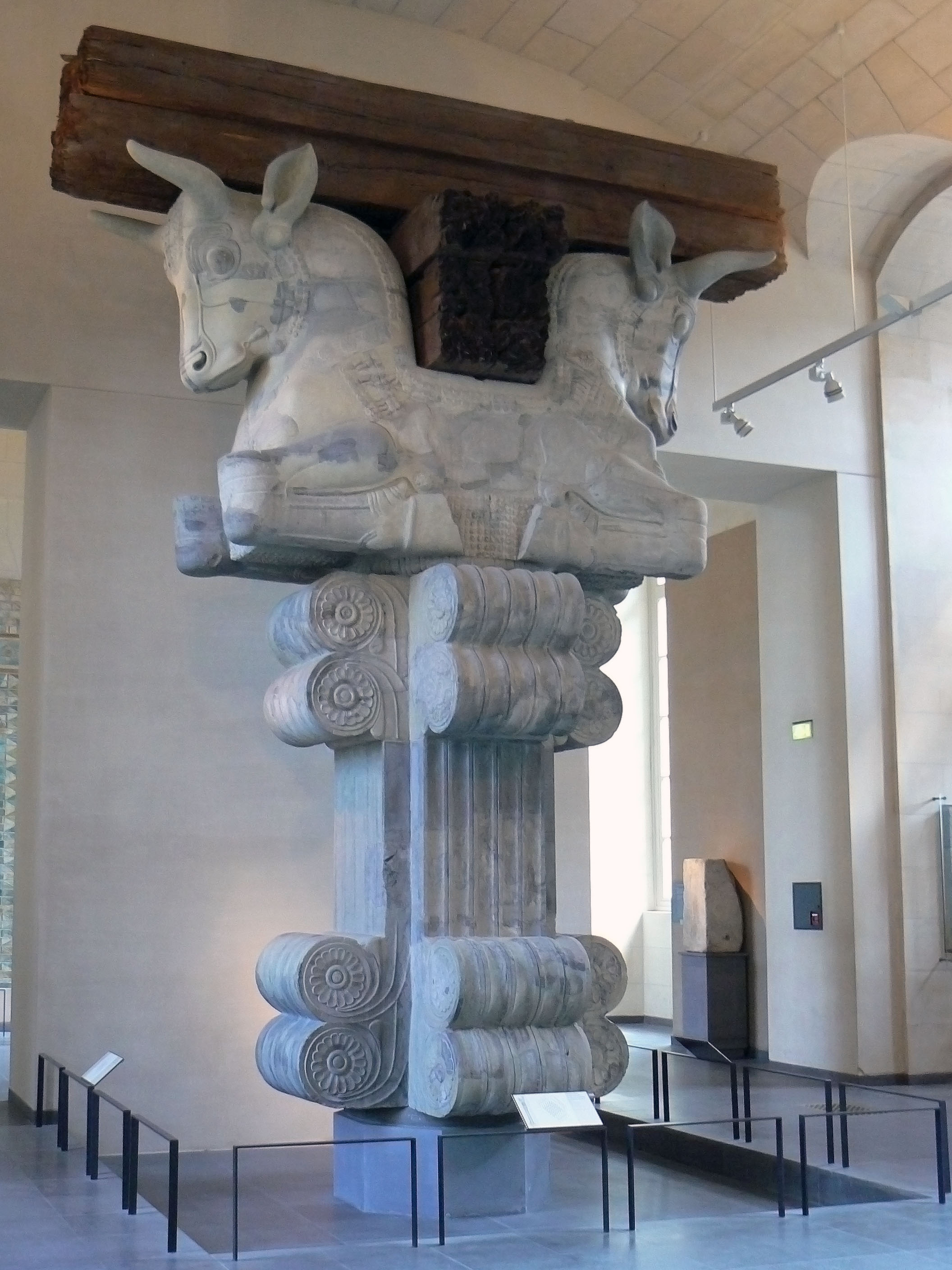
Bull capital from the Apadana of the Susa Palace, Louvre

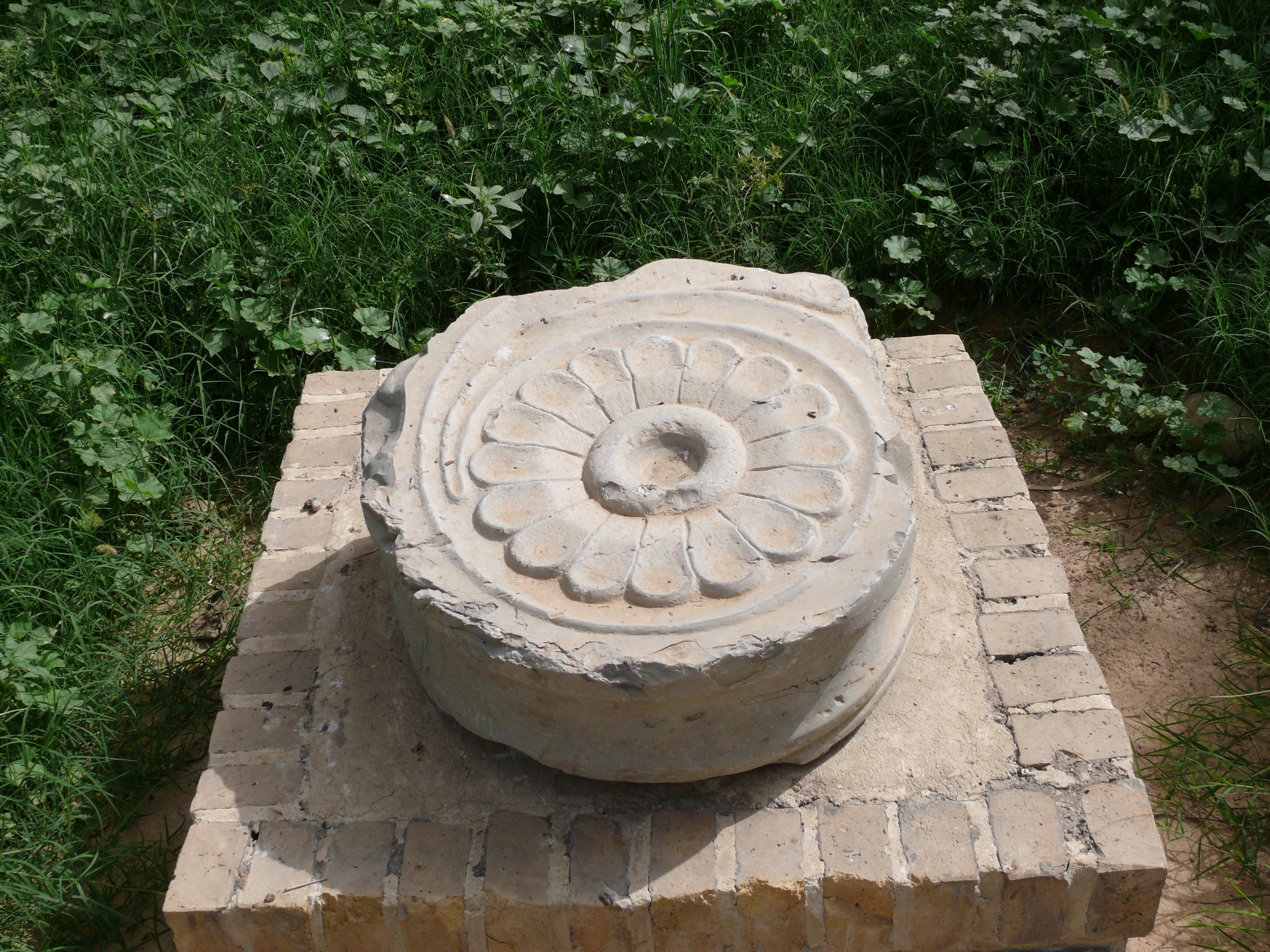
Relief of rosace

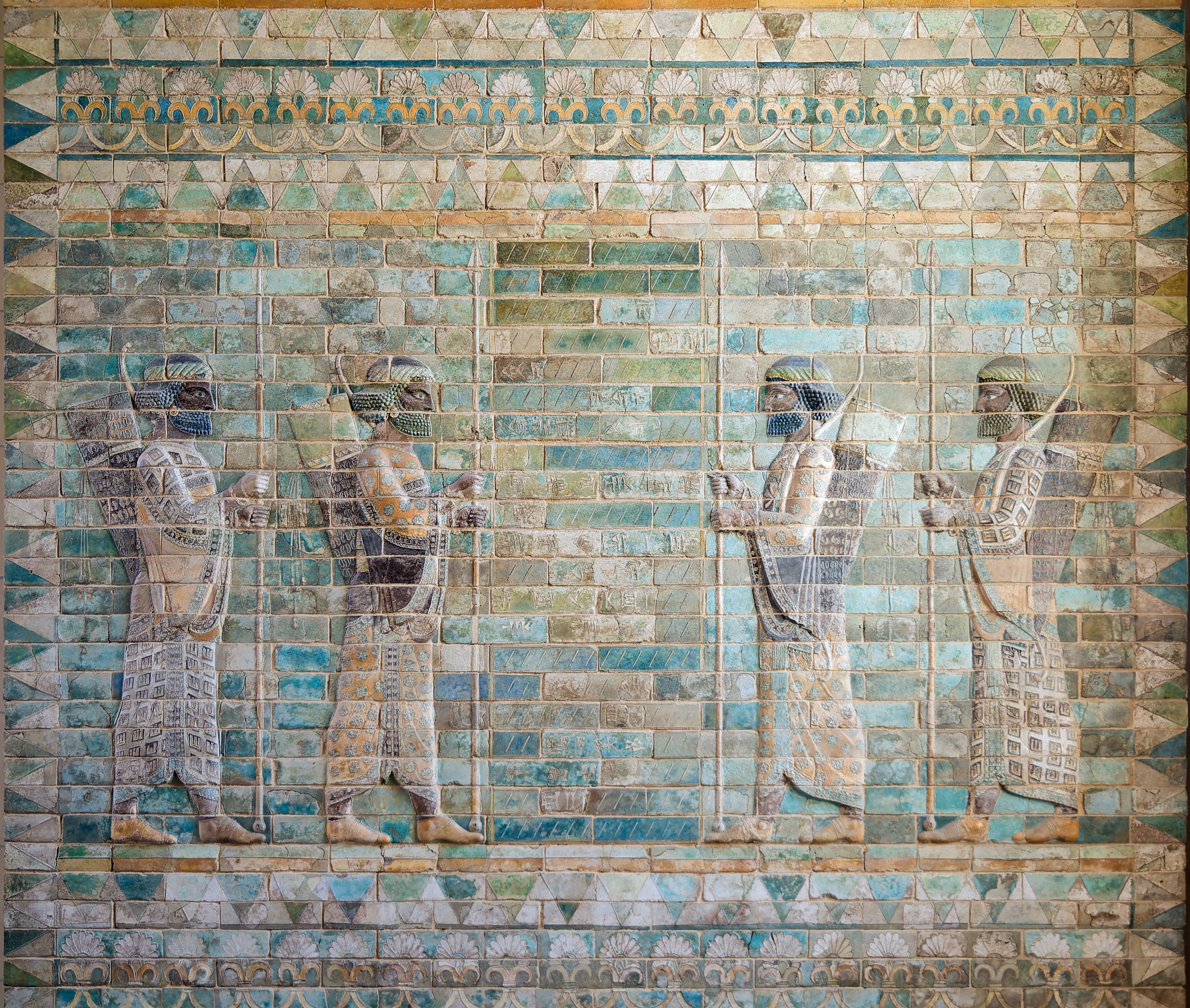
The Frieze of Archers, glazed siliceous bricks, Louvre

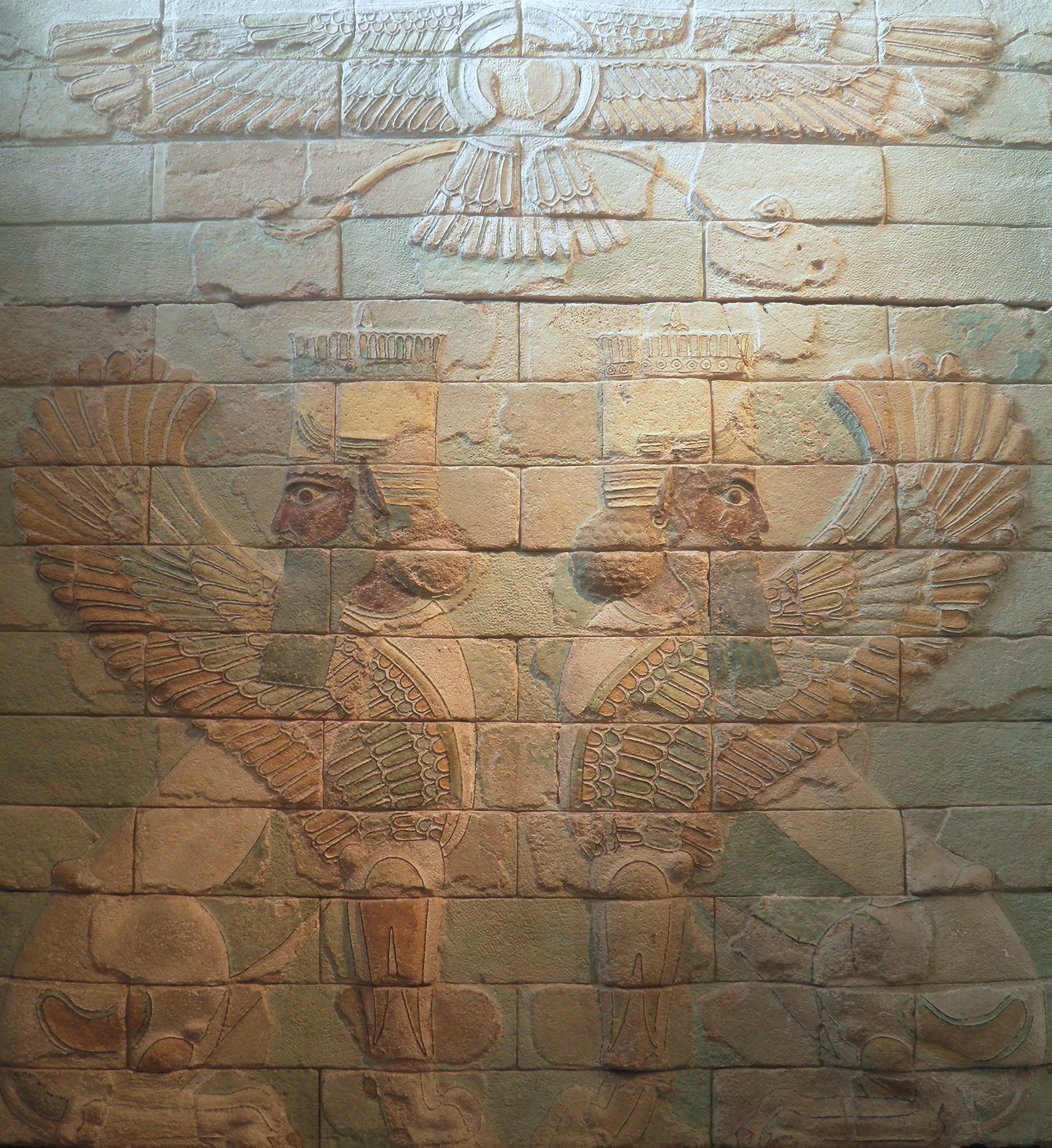
Decorative panel with sphinxes

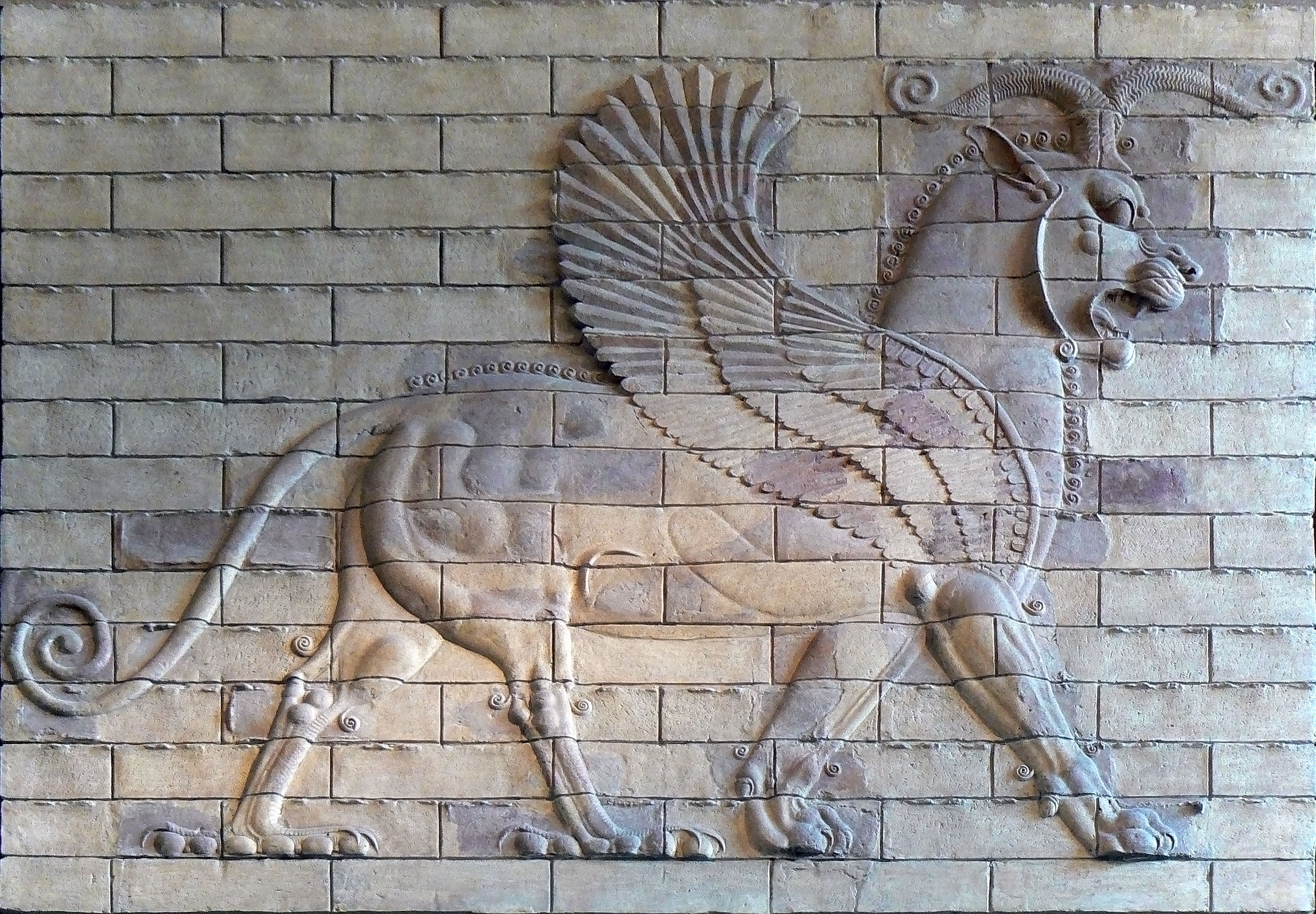
Relief of winged lion

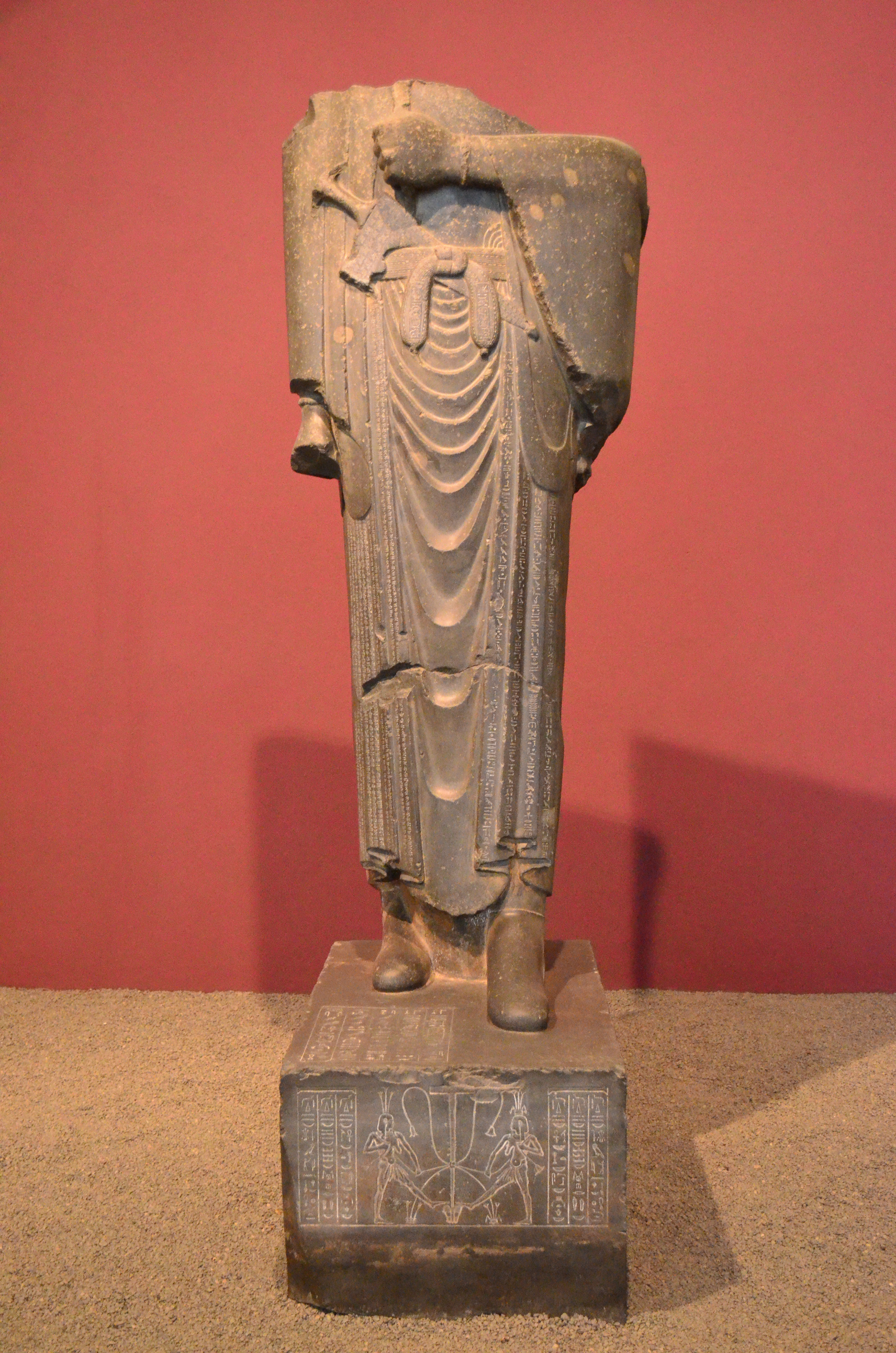
Statue of Darius, with a quadrilingual inscription at its base

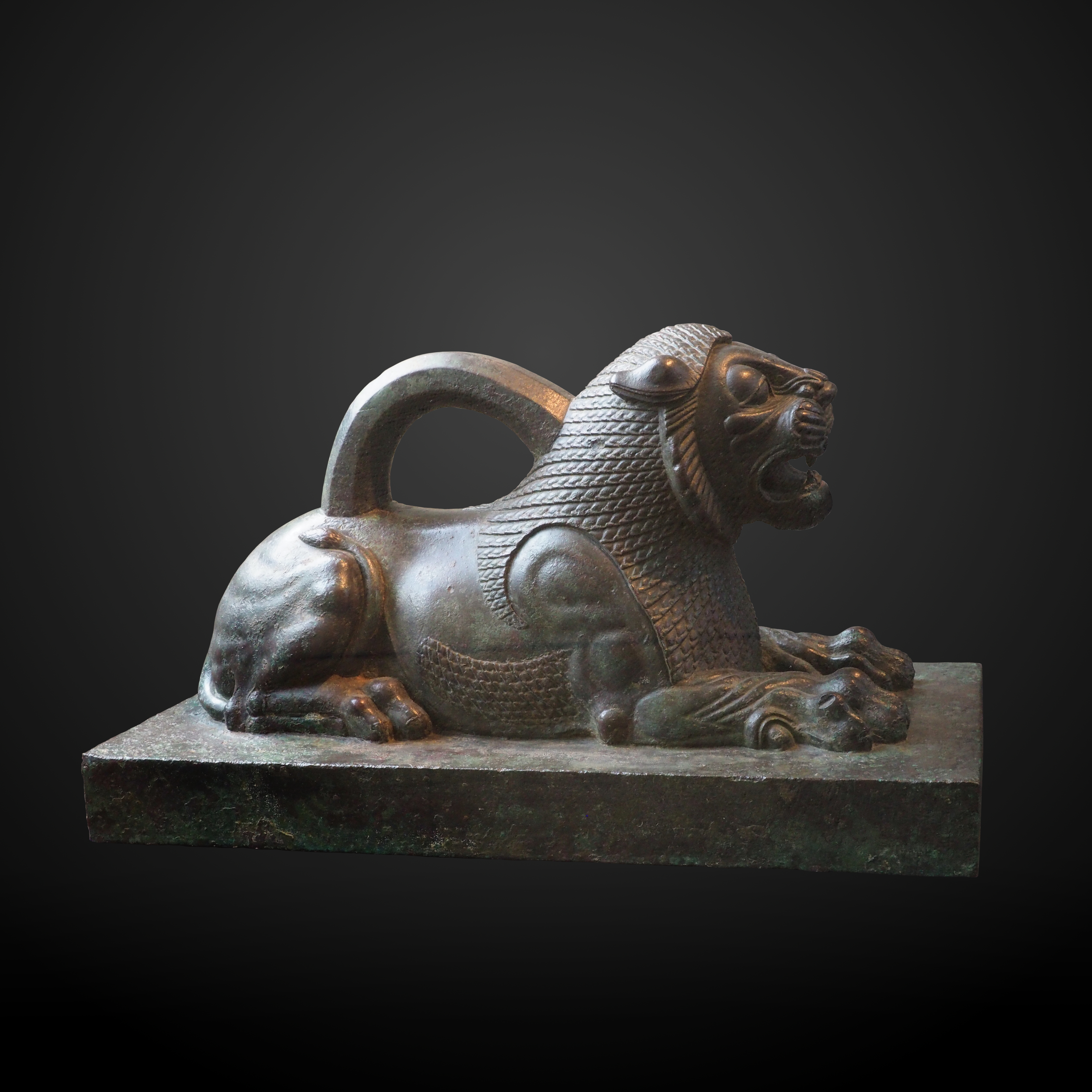
Lion-shaped weight

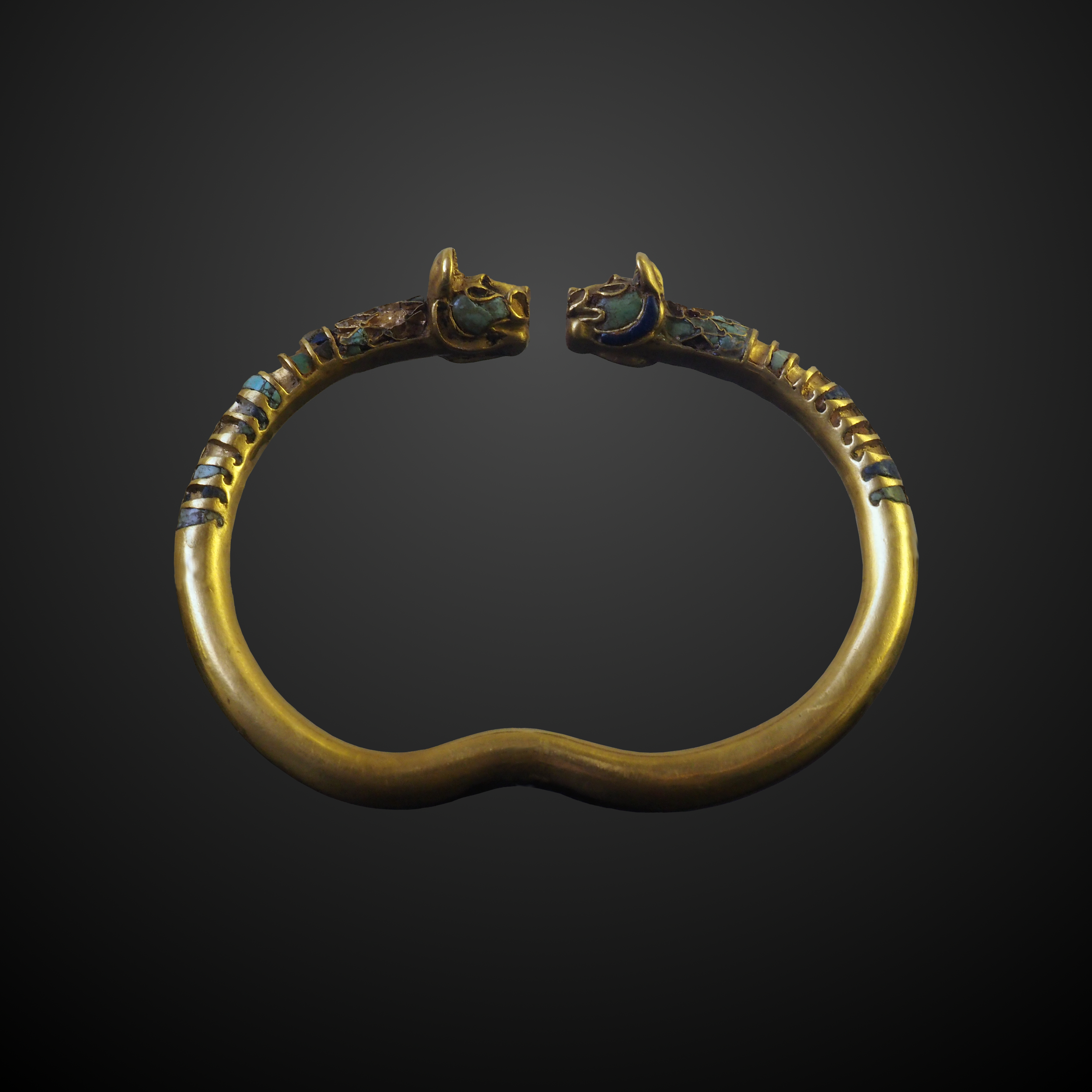
Bracelet ornated with a pair of lion heads

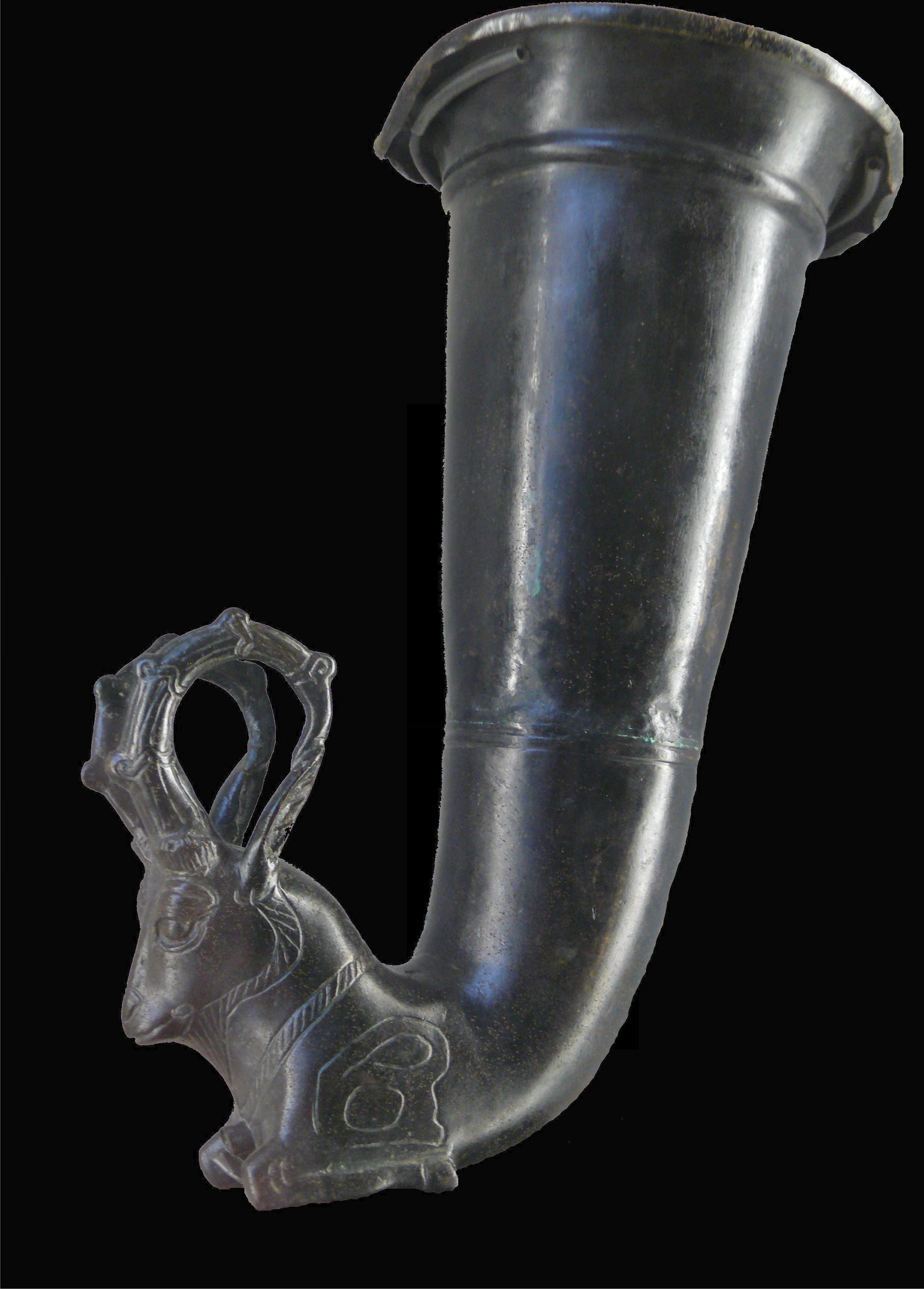
Rhyton

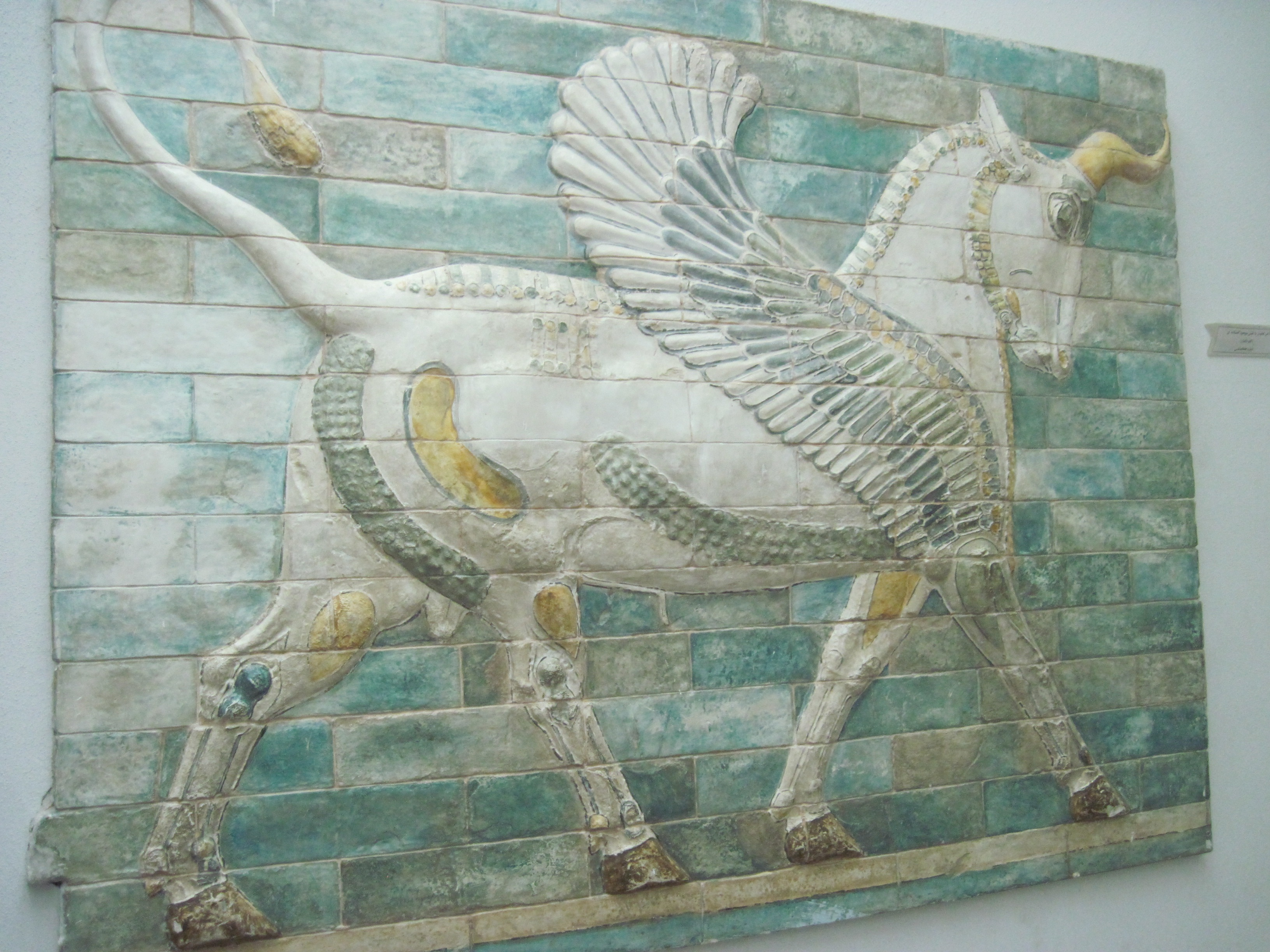
Winged Aurochs

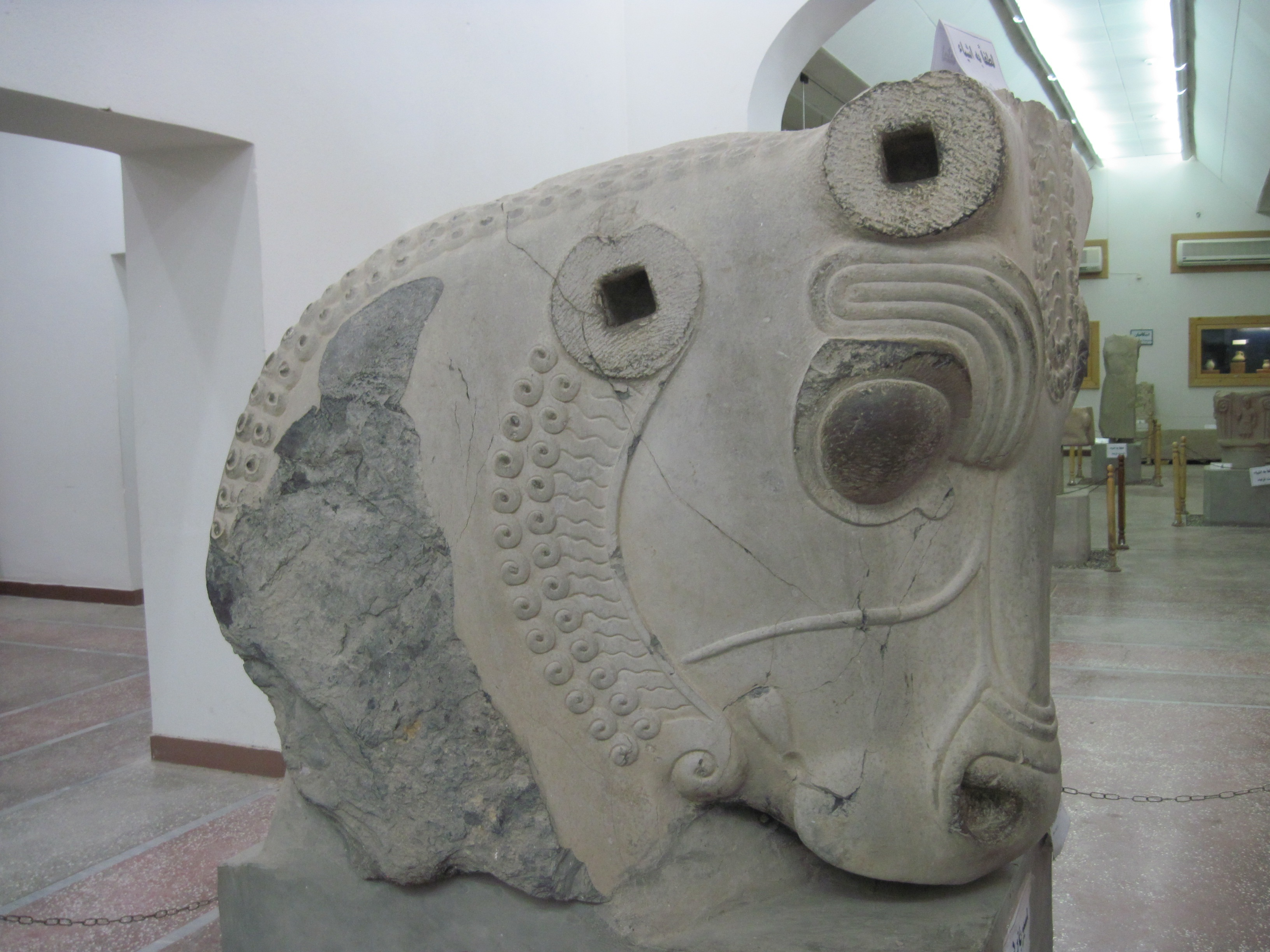
Capital remains of the Apadana palace of Susa located in the museum of Susa

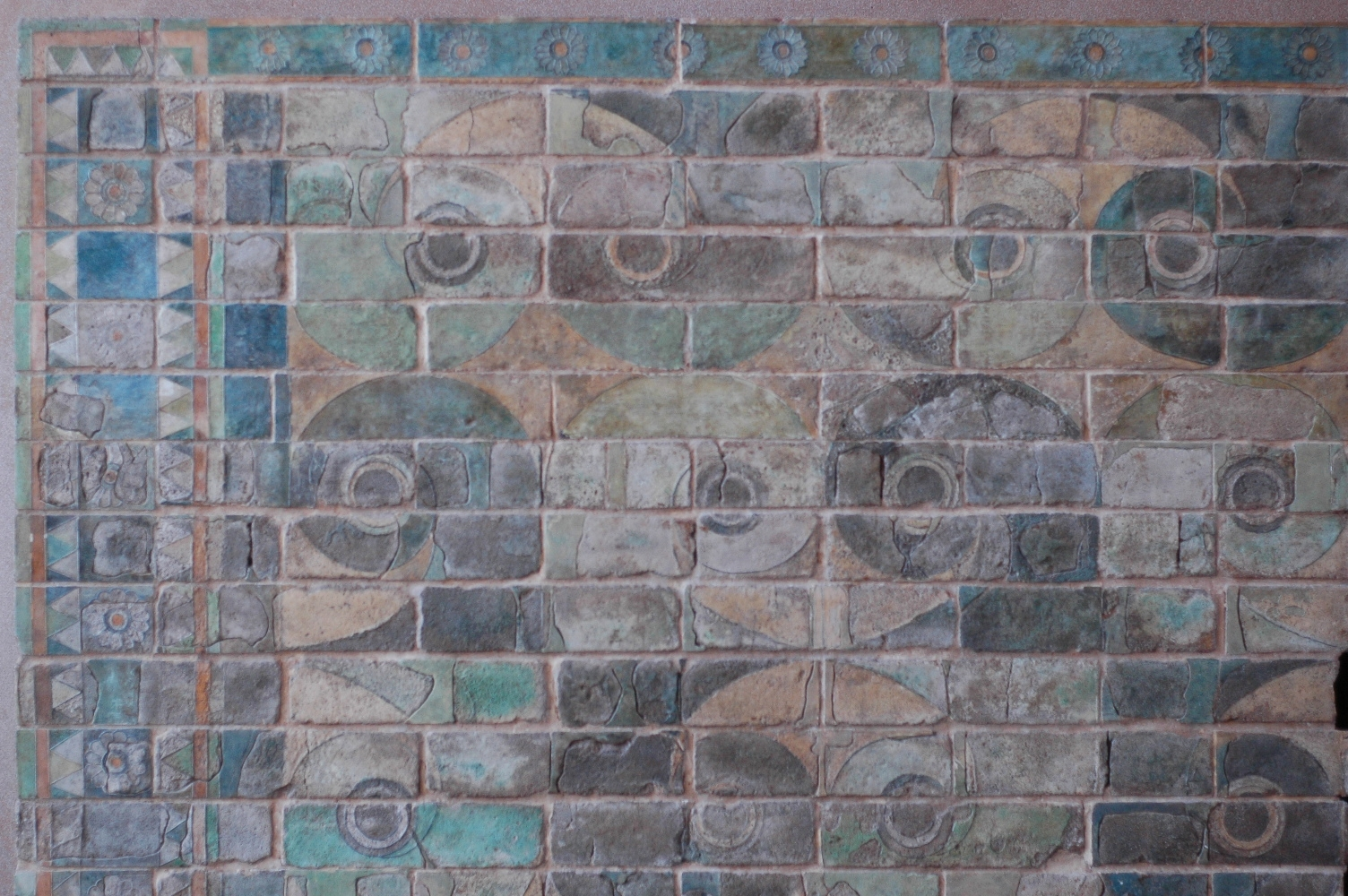
Glazed siliceous bricks with a decorative spirals pattern, from palace of Darius the Great at Susa, currently in the Louvre, France.

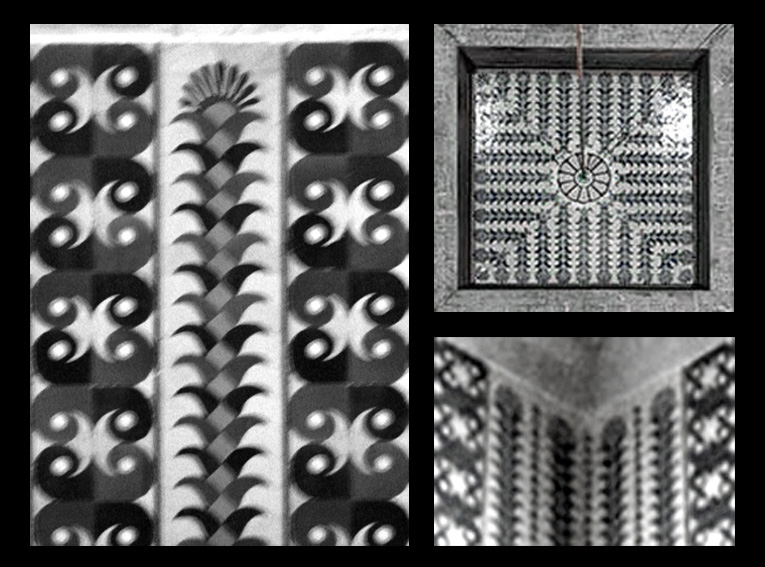
Similar patterns of Ferdowsi tomb, modeling from palace of Darius, Susa.
