= Stobrum =

Tree of unknown species mentioned by Pliny

Stobrum is a tree native to Carmania, with scented wood, which was an object of exchange in ancient times in the Roman Empire.

The tree was mentioned by Pliny the Elder in his Natural History:

The Arabians import from Carmania also the wood of a tree called stobrum, which they employ in fumigations, by steeping it in palm wine, and then setting fire to it. The odour first ascends to the ceiling, and then descends in volumes to the floor; It is very agreeable, but is apt to cause an oppression of the head, though unattended with pain; it is used for promoting sleep in persons when ill.

Pliny's editors John Bostock and Henry Thomas Riley note regarding stobrum:

It is not known what wood is meant under this name. Aloe, and some other woods, when ignited are slightly narcotic.

(Nevertheless, the plants such as Aloe vera are not otherwise cited as being or having been used by burning the wood.)

== See also ==
- Thyine wood
