= Carmania (region) =

Iranian/Karmanian Region of Iran

Coordinates: 30.2907°N 57.0679°E

Kārmanā (Old Persian) 𐎣𐎼𐎶𐎴𐎠
- Province of the Median Achaemenid, Seleucid, Arsacid, and Sasanian Empire
- c. 6th century BC–c. 650 AD
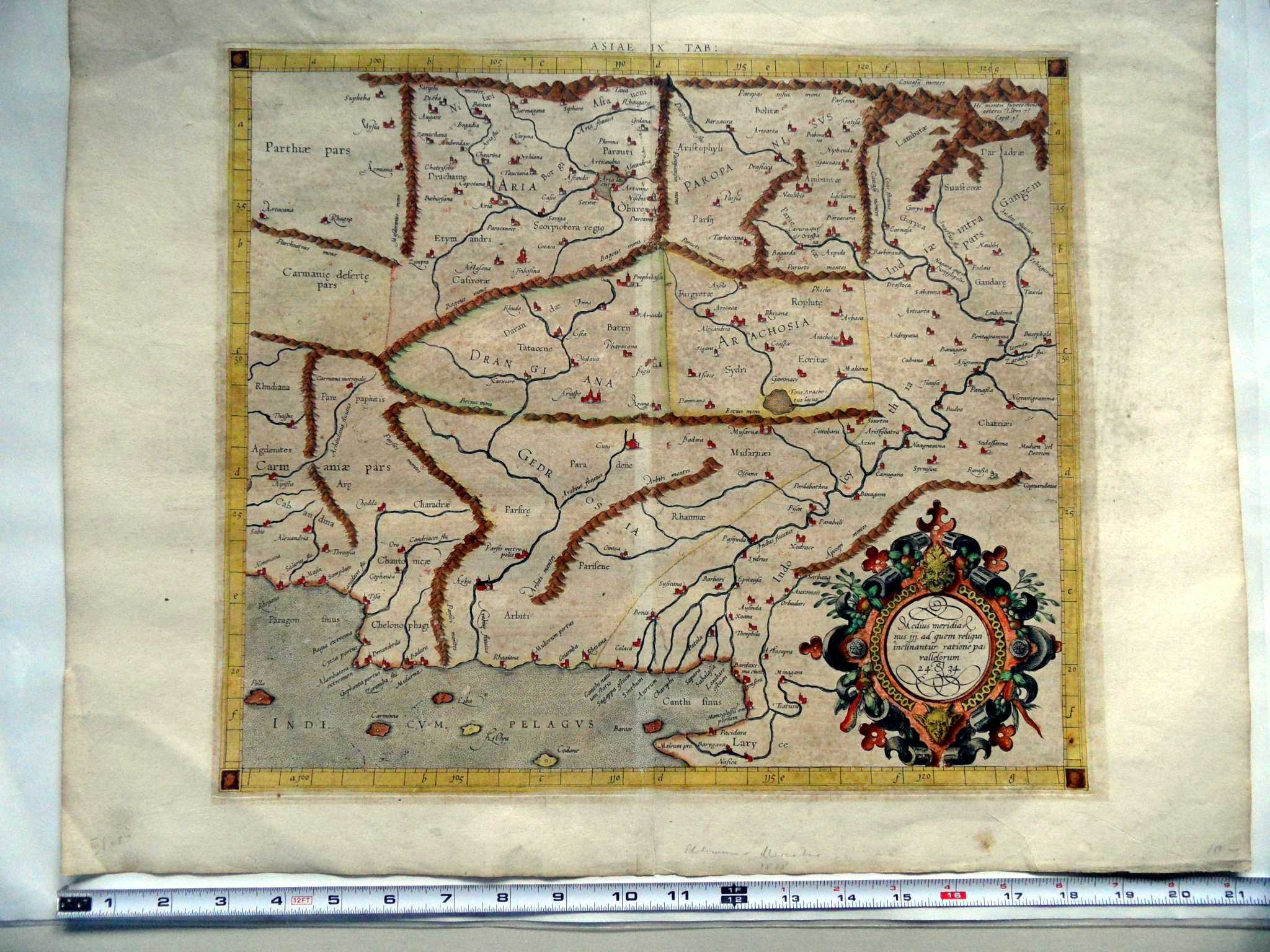
- Capital: Arta/Jiroft; Sirgan/Sirkan
- Historical era: Antiquity
  - Established: c. 6th century BC
  - Conquest by Arabs: c. 650 AD
Succeeded by
Rashidun Caliphate
- Today part of: Iran

Carmania (Ancient Greek: Καρμανία, romanized: Karmanía, Old Persian: 𐎣𐎼𐎶𐎴𐎠, romanized: Karmanā, Middle Persian: Kirmān) is a historical region that approximately corresponds to the current province of Kerman, Iran, and was a province of many Iranic empires such as Medes, Achaemenid, Seleucid, Parthian, and Sasanian Empire. The region bordered Persia proper & the Persian Gulf in the west, Makran & the Makran Sea in the south-east, Parthia in the north (also known as Abarshahr), and Aria to the northeast.

== History ==
=== Pre-Hellenistic Period ===
In the Early Bronze Age, late third millennium BC, it is postulated that the Jiroft culture developed and flourished in the region of Carmania. However, little is known of the history of the region during the Late Bronze Age and Early Iron Age. The region was settled by Iranian tribes in the first half of the first millennium BC.

Carmania was conquered by Cyrus the Great, founder of the Achaemenid Empire, in the sixth century BC. The 3rd century BC Babylonian writer Berossus detailed that Cyrus the Great granted Nabonidus, the last King of Babylon, Carmania as a vassal kingdom after the Achaemenid conquest of Babylonia in 539 BC. According to the 5th century BC Greek historian Ctesias, Cyrus, on his deathbed, appointed his son Bardiya as governor of the Bactrians, Chorasmians, Parthians, and Carmanians. Darius the Great later confiscated part of Nabonidus' land in Carmania. During the reign of Darius I, the Royal Road was built in Carmania, and the region was administered as a sub-province of the province of Persia. At a later date, Carmania came under the administration of a certain Karkiš, satrap (governor) of Gedrosia. It has been suggested that, due to an anachronism on behalf of Ctesias, Carmania may have become a separate province by the time of Artaxerxes II, in the late 5th century BC.

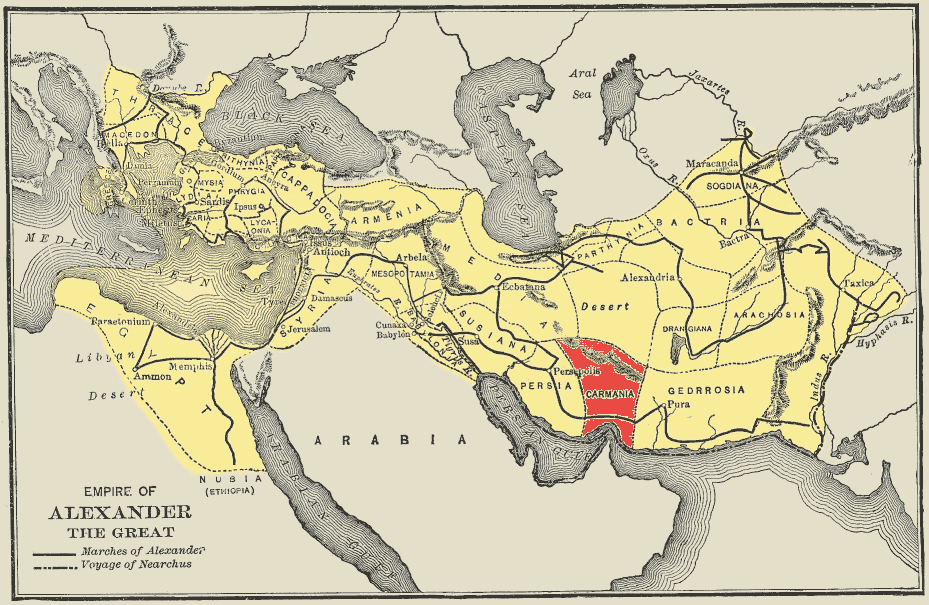
The area of Carmania within the empire of Alexander the Great after acquiring the Persian Empire

By the time of Alexander's conquest of Persia in 334 BC, Carmania was administered by a certain Aspastes, Satrap of Carmania, and the southern part of the province had its own governor. Aspastes acknowledged Alexander as king and was permitted to remain in office as satrap upon Alexander's conquest of the neighbouring province of Persia in 330 BC, however, Aspastes later plotted to rebel against Alexander whilst campaigning in the Indus Valley. Upon Alexander's return from India, Aspastes met with Alexander in the province of Gedrosia in 326 BC, where he was executed. To replace Aspastes, Alexander appointed Sibyrtius as satrap of Carmania, who was followed by the general Tlepolemus in the winter of 325/324 BC. Whilst in Carmania, Alexander established the city of Alexandria Carmania in early 324 BC where he settled his veterans, and also erected a pillar on the coastline. Alexander also consolidated his empire during his stay in Carmania as he summoned a number of governors and generals accused of conspiring and misbehaving and executed them, such as Cleander, accused of extortion, in 324 BC.

=== Hellenistic Period ===
The partition of Alexander's empire amongst the diadochi upon his death took place in the Partition of Babylon of 323 BC, and the Partition of Triparadisus in 321 BC, both of which confirmed Tlepolemus' control of Carmania. During the Second War of the Diadochi, Tlepolemus rallied his soldiers to join with Eumenes in the war against Cassander and Antigonus. Antigonus' victory in the war against Eumenes in 315 BC allowed him to gain undisputed control of the Asian territories of the empire, but allowed Tlepolemus continued in his office as satrap of Carmania. The eruption of the Third War of the Diadochi in 314 BC and the subsequent Babylonian War in 311 BC, however, led Antigonus to be deprived of the western and eastern halves of the Asian territories of the empire, respectively, and Carmania came under the control of Seleucus I Nicator in 309 BC, thus forming part of the Seleucid Empire. During the Fourth Syrian War, in the spring of 217 BC, Antiochus III the Great rallied soldiers from Carmania who were put under the command of Aspasianus the Mede and Byttacus the Macedonian and took part in the Battle of Raphia against Ptolemaic Egypt, which resulted in Antiochus' defeat. In 205 BC, Antiochus III, returning from India by way of Gedrosia, wintered in Carmania before continuing his march west. Carmania remained a province within the Seleucid Empire until the mid 2nd century BC in which it was conquered by the Arsacid Empire.

=== Post-Hellenistic Period ===
Under the Arsacid Empire Carmania was a vassal kingdom. In 210 AD it was ruled by a certain Balash who was defeated and captured by Ardashir, king of Persia, and the region was annexed to his domain. Ardeshir rebelled in 212 AD and rallied soldiers from the region, using them in his campaigns against the Arsacid Empire. He later appointed his son, Ardeshir, as governor of Carmania with the title of Kirmanshah, who continued to rule during the reign of Ardeshir's successor, Shapur I. Ardeshir I also undertook military campaigns in Carmania after his victory over the Arsacid Empire and founded the city of Weh-Ardeshir as an outpost on the trade route to India. Other settlements such as the oasis town of Bam and city of Mahan, which was founded by Adar Mahan, marzban (governor) of Carmania, were founded during the Sasanian period as part of the settlement of Carmania. The region surrounding Bam suffered from banditry and repeated nomadic incursions. Carmania was ruled by the future Bahram I in 270 AD.

Early in his reign, Shapur II forcibly deported Arab tribes to Carmania and settled several Tagleb tribes in the vicinity of Bam, several Abd-al-Qays and Tamim clans southeast of Weh-Ardeshir and a number of Bakr bin Wa’el clans at Weh-Ardeshir. During the reign of Shapur III, the region was governed by Bahram who held the title of Kirmanshah, later ascending to the throne. Bahram founded the town of Shiragan which served as the capital of the province for the remainder of the Sasanian period. The province of Carmania had a single amargar (chief fiscal officer) assigned to the whole province during Sasanian rule. During the Muslim invasion of Iran, a Muslim army reached Jiroft in 640 AD. A Muslim army invaded the island of Abarkawan and defeated and killed the marzban of Carmania in 643 AD. In 644 AD, upon the fall of Spahan, a number of notables fled to Carmania and Muslim forces raided the towns of Shiragan and Bam. Yazdegerd III fled to Carmania after the fall of Persia in 650 AD but alienated the marzban and retreated to Sakastan ahead of a Muslim army that defeated and killed the marzban. Mujashi ibn Mas'ud al-Sulami led the conquest of Carmania and some towns were taken by force whilst others surrendered. Many people fled into the mountains, to Sakastan, Khorosan, Makran and overseas.

== Economy ==
Carmania was noted in Antiquity for its abundance of a number of mineral resources such as copper, salt, sulphur, ochre, orpiment and agate. The mines surrounding Carmana are also attested for the production of silver necessary for the minting of coinage. A mine near Carmana is known to have produced turquoise gems, but of lesser quality and number than the mines of Parthia. Sissoo wood was also exported and was notably used in the construction of the palace of Darius I at Susa.

Wines produced in Carmania proper, a cultivated and fertile area, were famous and, alongside other goods, were exported through Hormuz, the principal port within the region. Effective road communications with the other provinces of the empire also facilitated trade and exportation of goods from within Carmania. The region had economic relations with Mesopotamia during the reign of Khosrow I in the 6th century AD.

== Population ==
Carmanians (Ancient Greek: Καρμάνιοι Karmánioi, Καρμανιτοι Karmanitoi, or Γερμάνιοι Germanioi, Latin: Carmanii) were the inhabitants of the region of Carmania during Antiquity, who were a warlike people who practised cannibalism, according to Strabo. Under the Achaemenid Empire, the Carmanians had become Persianised and Strabo noted the cultural and linguistic similarities the Carmanians shared with the neighbouring Persians. Despite Persianisation, the Carmanians retained a number of unique traditions and social structure, as attested by the requirement of the presentation of the head of a slain enemy to the king in order to marry, as well as strict rites of passage distinct from Persian traditions. Persians and Elamites mixed in the region during the Achaemenid period and Elamites inhabited the Zagros Mountains.

Herodotus listed Carmanians amongst other Iranian tribes that had settled and abandoned nomadic life to take part in agriculture, as opposed to other tribes that had continued to practise nomadic pastoralism. One such nomadic tribe was that of the Sagartians who also inhabited Carmania. The Sagartians and Isatichae inhabited desert Carmania. According to Ptolemy, Carmania was also home to the Pasargadai tribe. Non-Iranians, known simply as the Turtle-eaters, inhabited the coast of Carmania at the time of Alexander the Great.

== See also ==
- Andanis River, Carmania
- Stobrum, a product of the region

== Bibliography ==
- Briant, Pierre (2001). "GERMANIOI". Encyclopaedia Iranica.
- Brunner, C. J. (2004). "IRAN v. PEOPLES OF IRAN (2) Pre-Islamic". Encyclopaedia Iranica.
- Burstein, Stanley M. (1989). "BEROSSUS". Encyclopaedia Iranica.
- Chaumont, M. L.; Schippmann, K. (1988). "BALĀŠ". Encyclopaedia Iranica.
- Dandamayev, M. A. (1988). "BARDIYA". Encyclopaedia Iranica.
- Eilers, W. (1987). "ASAGARTA". Archived copy. Encyclopaedia Iranica. Archived from the original on 2016-12-18.
- Frye, Richard Nelson (2004). "IRAN v. PEOPLES OF IRAN (1) A General Survey". Encyclopaedia Iranica.
- Harper, Prudence Oliver; Meyers, Pieter (1981). Silver Vessels of the Sasanian Period: Royal Imagery. Metropolitan Museum of Art. p. 29. "kerman ."
- Jacobs, Bruno (2006). "ACHAEMENID SATRAPIES". Encyclopaedia Iranica.
- Kasheff, M. (1982). "ABARKĀVĀN". Encyclopaedia Iranica.
- Klíma, O. (1988). "Bahrām IV". Encyclopaedia Iranica.
- Lendering, Jona (1997). "Carmania". Livius.
- MacKenzie, D. N.; Chaumont, M. L. (1989). "ĀMĀRGAR". Encyclopaedia Iranica.
- Mahaffy, John Pentland (1895). The Empire of the Ptolemies. Cambridge University Press. ISBN 9781108078658.
- Morony, Michael (1986). "ARAB ii. Arab conquest of Iran". Encyclopaedia Iranica.
- Morony, Michael (2006). "IRAQ i. IN THE LATE SASANID AND EARLY ISLAMIC ERAS". Encyclopaedia Iranica.
- Morony, Michael (2011). "Iran in the Early Islamic Period". The Oxford Handbook of Iranian History. Oxford University Press. ISBN 9780199875757.
- Oberling, P.; Hourcade, Bernard (1986). "ARAB iv. Arab tribes of Iran". Encyclopaedia Iranica.
- Planhol, Xavier de; Pārīzī, M.-E. Bāstānī (1988). "BAM (2)". Encyclopaedia Iranica.
- Planhol, Xavier de; Hourcade, Bernard (2014). "KERMAN ii. Historical Geography". Archived copy. Encyclopaedia Iranica. Archived from the original on 2016-11-17.
- Polybius (1889). Evelyn S. Shuckburgh, ed. Histories.
- Rawlinson, George (1875). The Seven Great Monarchies Of The Ancient Eastern World, Vol 5: Persia.
- Roaf, M. (2012). "Karmana". Pleiades.
- Schmitt, Rüdiger (1990). "CARMANIA". Encyclopaedia Iranica.
- Shahbazi, A. Sh. (1986). "ARMY i. Pre-Islamic Iran". Encyclopaedia Iranica.
- Shahbazi, A. Sh. (1987). "ASPASTES". Encyclopaedia Iranica.
- Stronach, David; Gopnik, Hilary (2009). "PASARGADAE". Encyclopaedia Iranica.
- Walbank, Frank W. (2015). "Alexander the Great". Encyclopædia Britannica.
- Wiesehöfer, Josef (2006). "Carmania". Brill´s New Pauly.
