= Apadana =

Hall in Persepolis, Iran

Coordinates: 29.935°N 52.890°E

External videos
- Reconstruction of Apadana Palace. The audience hall in Persepolis (c. 6th-5th century BC), Iran on YouTube // Archaeology News — June 01, 2021

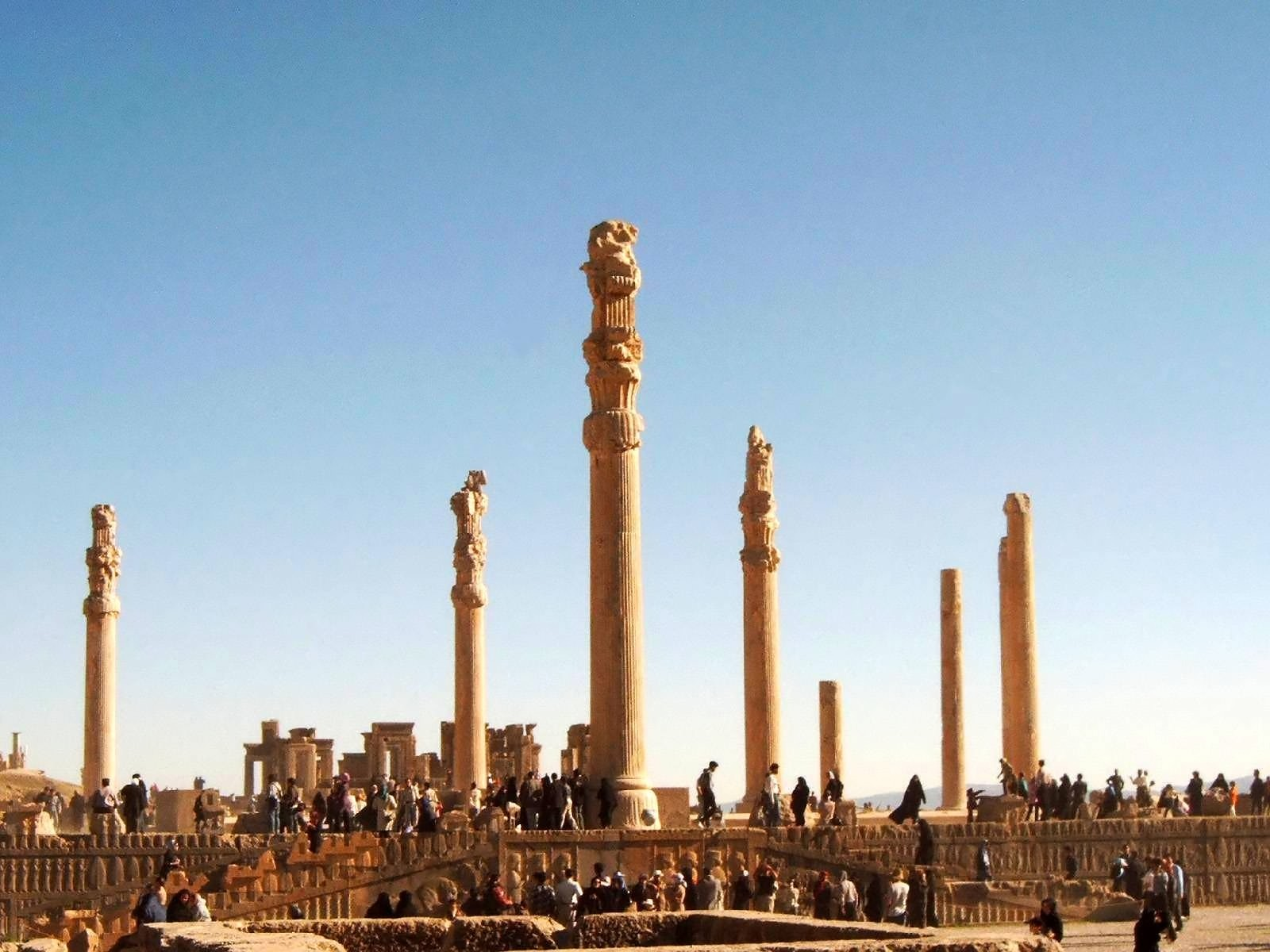
Ruins of the Apadana Palace

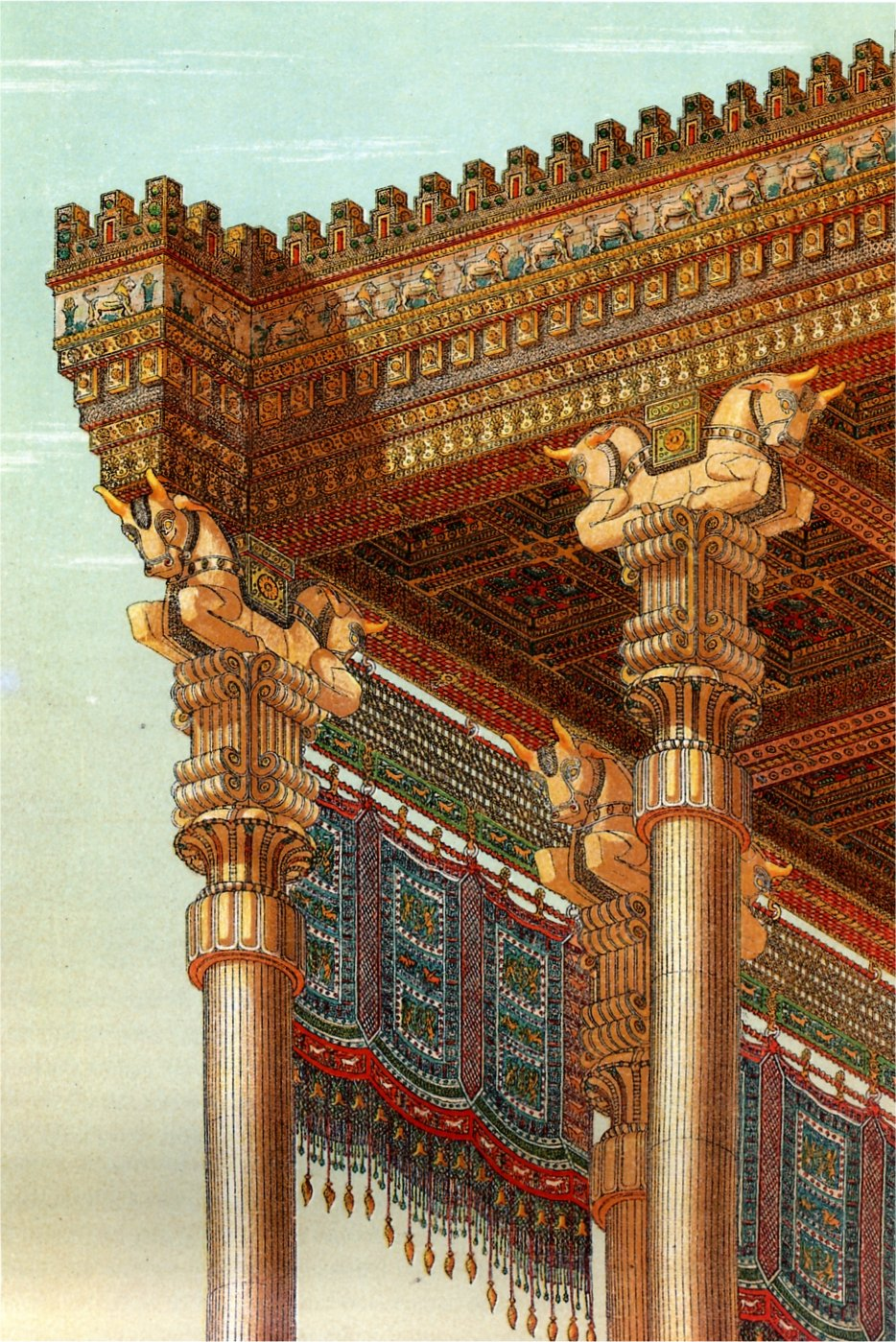
Reconstruction of the Apadana's roof by Chipiez

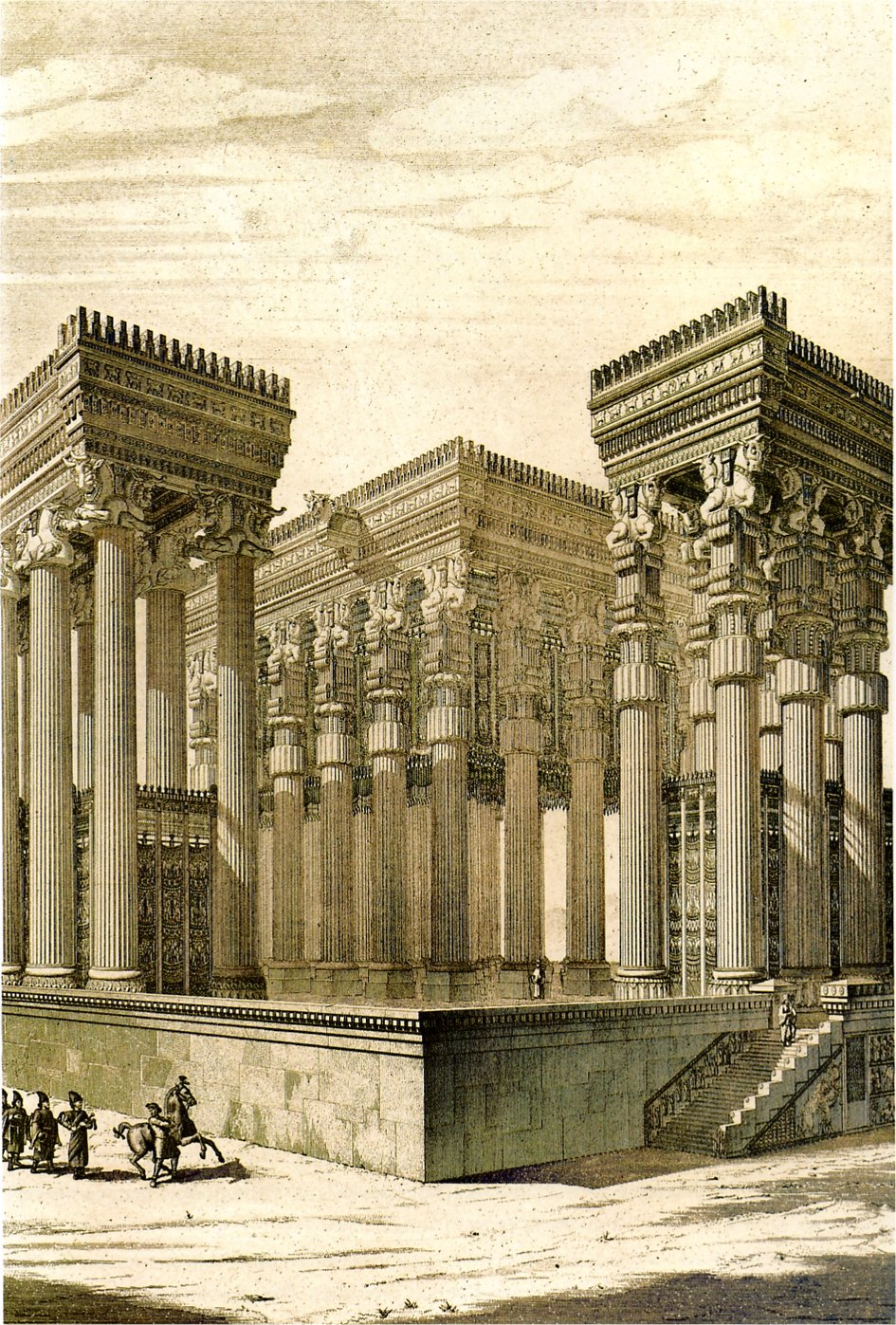
Reconstruction of the Apadana by Chipiez

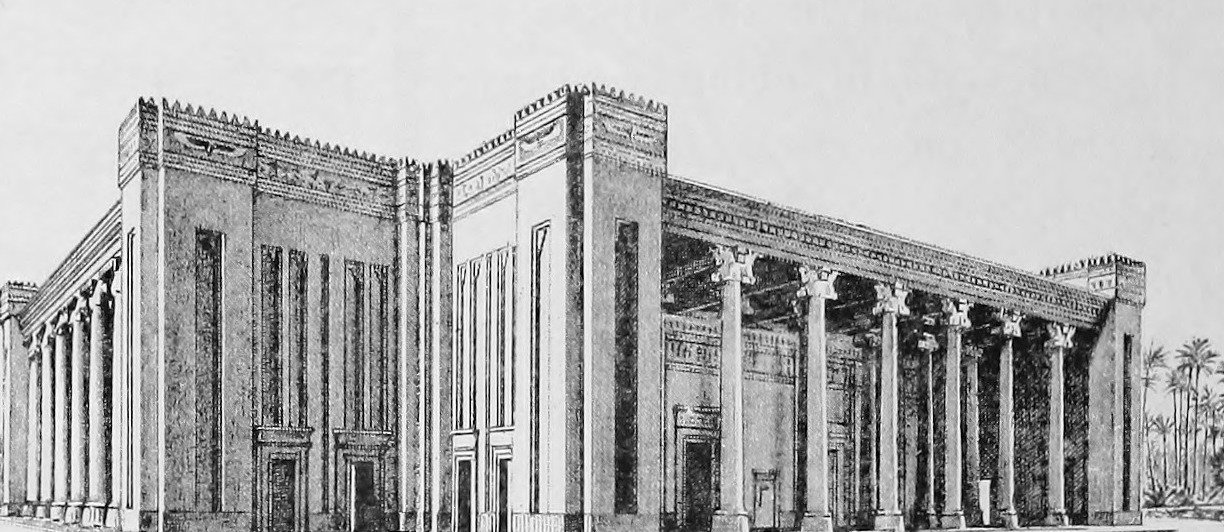
Apadana of Susa, reconstruction drawing, 1903

Apadana (Old Persian: 𐎠𐎱𐎠𐎭𐎴, [apəˈdänə] or [äpəˈdänə]) is a large hypostyle hall in Persepolis, Iran. It belongs to the oldest building phase of the city of Persepolis, in the first half of the 5th century BC, as part of the original design by Darius the Great. Its construction was completed by Xerxes I. Modern scholarship "demonstrates the metaphorical nature of the Apadana reliefs as idealised social orders".

== Etymology ==
As a word, apadāna (Old Persian 𐎠𐎱𐎭𐎠𐎴, masc.) is used to designate a hypostyle hall, i.e., a palace or audience hall of stone construction with columns. The word is rendered in Elamite as ha-ha-da-na and in Babylonian ap-pa-da-an is etymologically ambiguous. It has been compared to the Sanskrit āpādana (आपादन) which means 'to arrive at', and also to the Sanskrit apa-dhā (अपधा) which means "a hide-out or concealment", and the Greek apo-thēkē (αποθήκη), meaning "storehouse". The word survived into later periods in Iran, as the Parthian 'pdn(y) or 'pdnk(y) "palace", and outside Iran it still survives in several languages as loan-words (including the Arabic فَدَن (transliteration: fadan) for "palace" and the Armenian aparan-kʿ for "palace".)

As a modern architectural and archaeological term, the word apadana is also used to refer to Urartian hypostyle halls, such as those excavated at Altintepe and Erebuni. These halls predate those from Persia, and it has been proposed that Urartu could be the stylistic origin of the later Persian hypostyle audience halls.

== Apadana Palace in Susa ==
The Apadana Palace in Susa started construction during the reign of Darius after the overall plan was chosen in 515 BC but it was finished during the reign of Xerxes I. The walls of this palace are made of clay with a brick facade and its columns are made of stone. Its inner walls were covered with glazed brick reliefs and featured soldiers of the Eternal Guard, a winged lion, and a lotus flower. Important parts of the Apadana Palace caught fire during the reign of Artaxerxes I (461 BC) and were rebuilt during the reign of Artaxerxes II (359 BC).

== Description ==
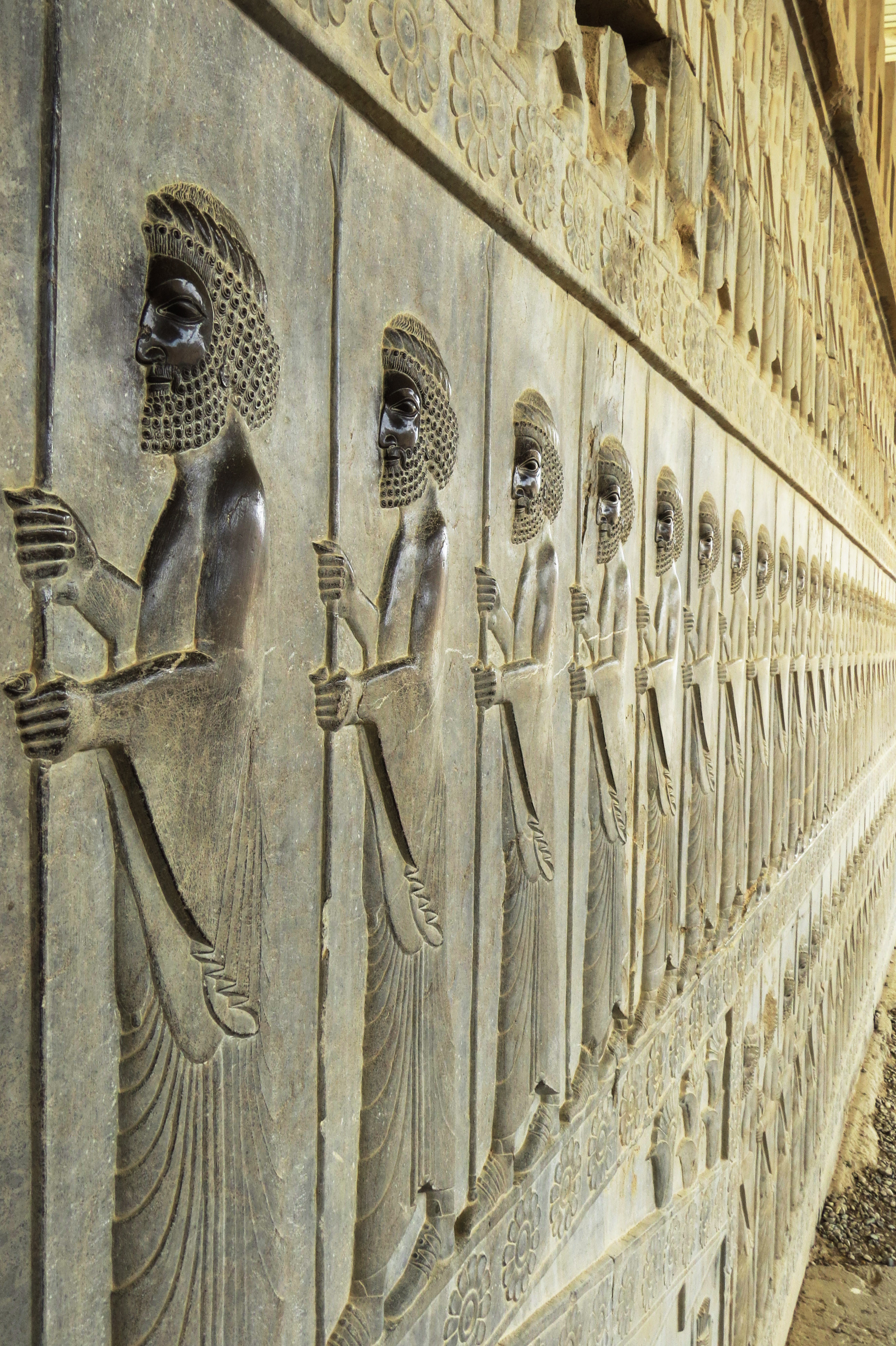
Apadana Palace (East Side), Persepolis

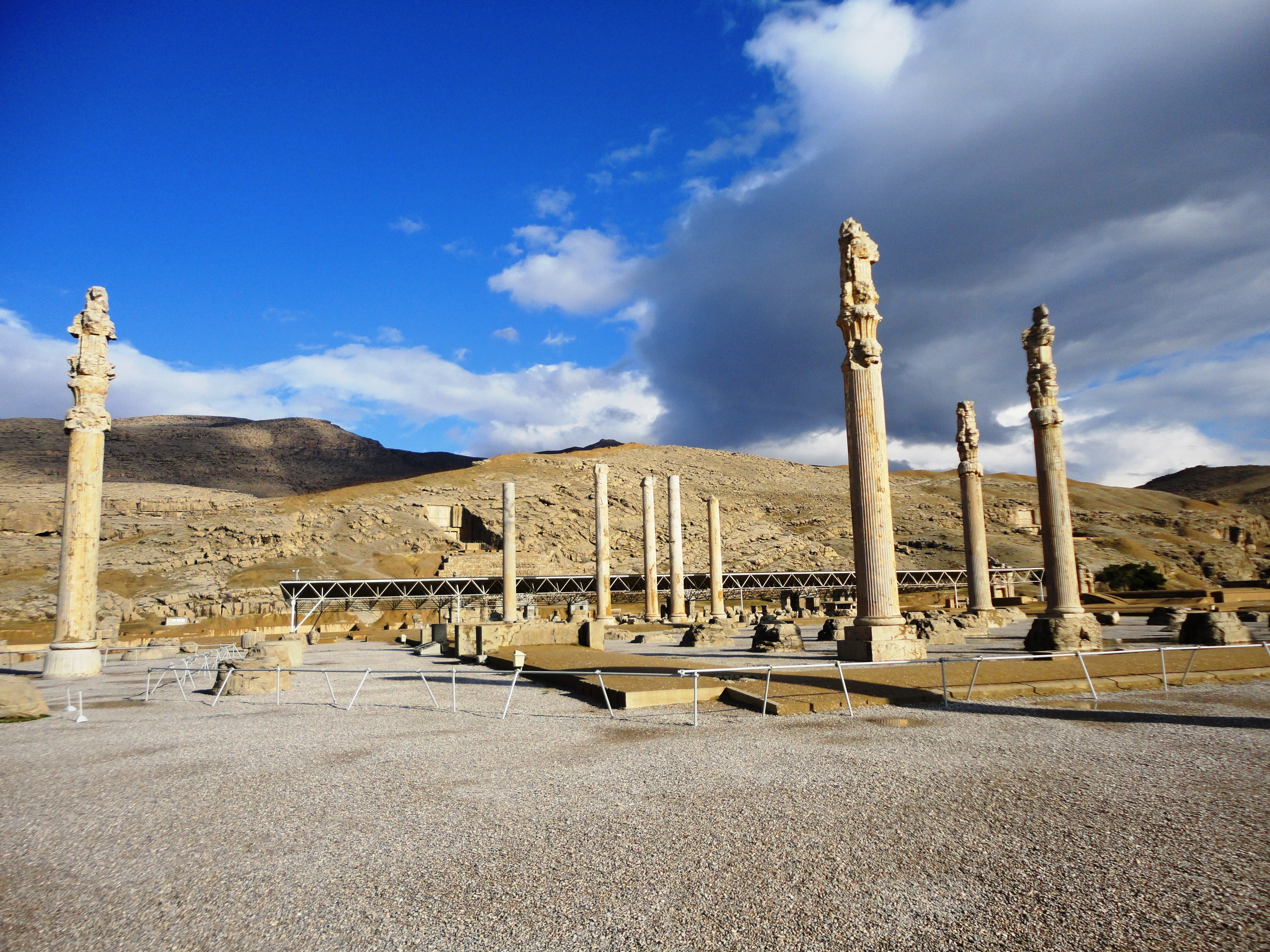
Apadana Palace, Persepolis

The Apadana was the largest building on the Terrace at Persepolis and was excavated by the German archaeologist Ernst Herzfeld and his assistant Friedrich Krefter, and Erich Schmidt, between 1931 and 1939. Important material relevant to the excavations are today housed in the archives of the Freer Gallery of Art in Washington, DC.

== Measurements ==
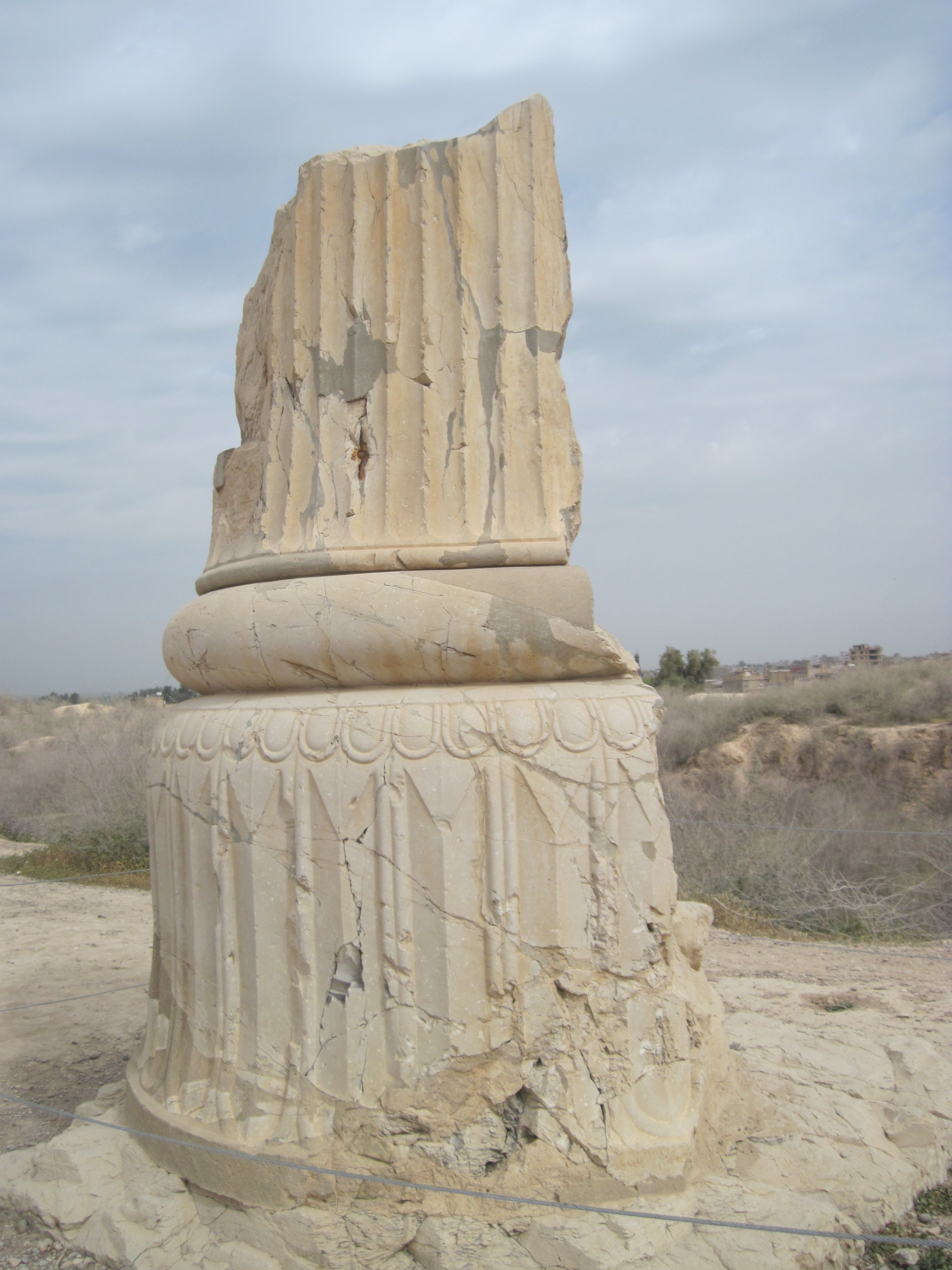
Pillar of the Apadana Palace of Susa

The Apadana at Persepolis has a surface of 1000 square metres; its roof was supported by 72 columns, each 24 metres tall. The entire hall was destroyed in 331 BC by the army of Alexander the Great. Stones from the columns were used as building material for nearby settlements. By the start of the 20th century, only 13 of these giant columns were still standing. The re-erecting of a complete, but fallen column in the 1970s, is now the 14th standing column of the Apadana.

The Apadana in Susa was—like the city itself—largely abandoned, and pillaged for building material.

== Legacy ==
The apadana hall influenced the Umayyad architecture. Early mosques built in Persia and Iraq imitate this structure.

== Bibliography ==
- Cool Root, Margaret (1985). "The Parthenon Frieze and the Apadana Reliefs at Persepolis: Reassessing a Programmatic Relationship". American Journal of Archaeology. 89 (1): 103–122. doi:10.2307/504773. JSTOR 504773. S2CID 192986359.
- Schmitt, R; Stronach, D. "Apadana". Encyclopædia Iranica. 2. Routledge.
