= Andanis =

River in Iran

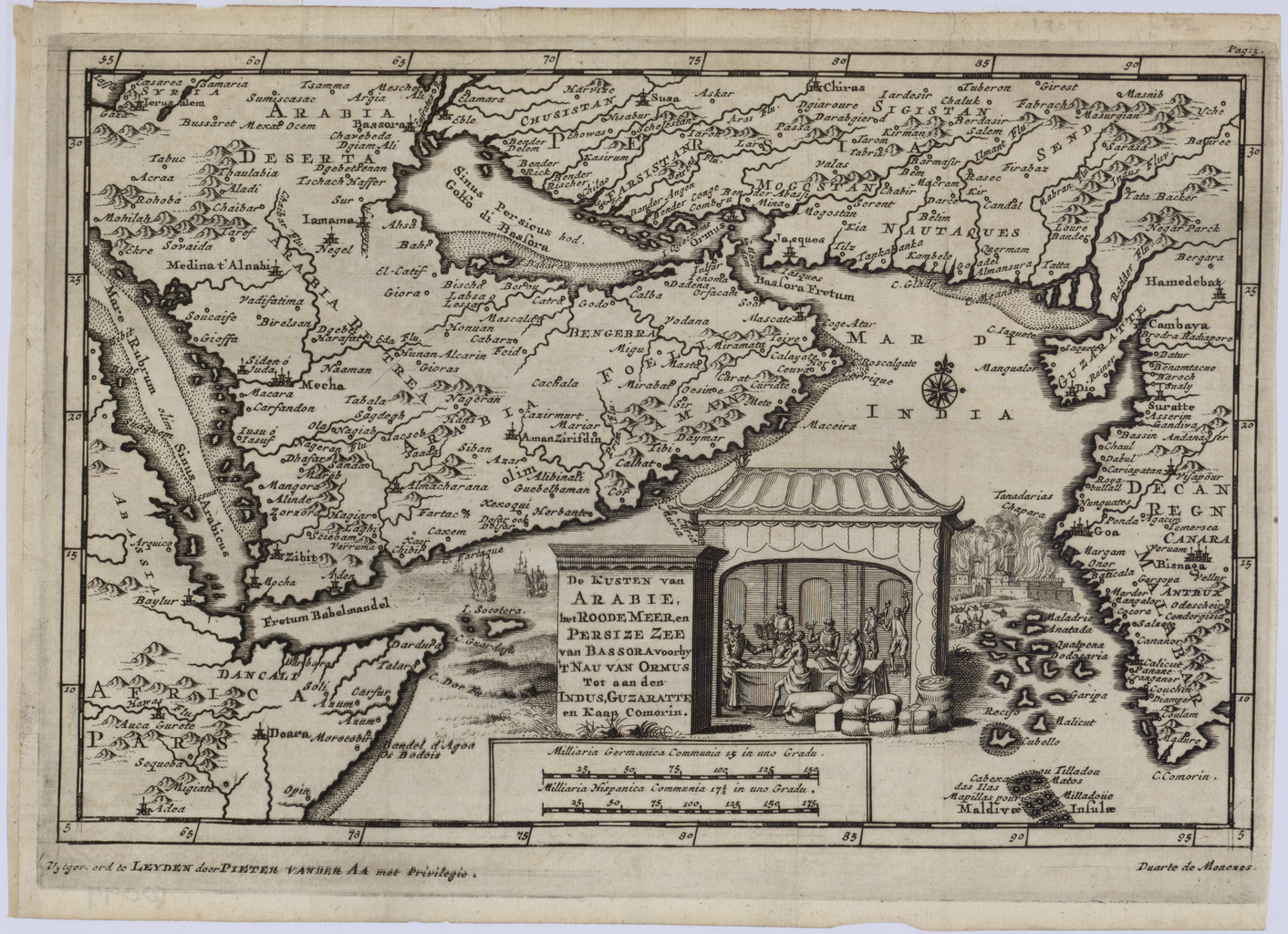
Straits of Hormouz

The Andanis River, also known as the Ananis and Anamis, was a river known to Ancient Greece.

== Location ==
It was a river of Carmania mentioned by Ptolemy and Pliny, who called it the Ananis, and Arrian, who called it the Anamis. It was located along the coast of Hormouz around latitude 27.5N and longitude 57.5E and has been tentatively identified with the Mināb river.

== History ==
The river was mentioned by Ptolemy, and Nearchus, being visited by the army of Alexander the Great. It was located near the Island of Ormuz.
