= Chorasmia (satrapy) =

Huvārazmiya (Old Persian) 𐎢𐎺𐎠𐎼𐏀𐎷𐎡𐎹 𐎢𐎺𐎠𐎼𐏀𐎷𐎡𐏁 hUvārazmiya hUvārazmiš
- Satrapy of Achaemenid Empire
- Before 522 BC–4th century BE
- Standard of Cyrus the Great

- Location of the Huvārazmiya satrapy within the Achaemenid realm
- Government
  - Type: monarchy
- King of Kings
  - 522–486 BC: Darius the Great
  - 336–330 BC: Darius III
- Historical era: Achaemenid Empire
  - Established: Before 522 BC
  - Dissolution: 4th century BE
Succeeded by
Ancient Macedonia

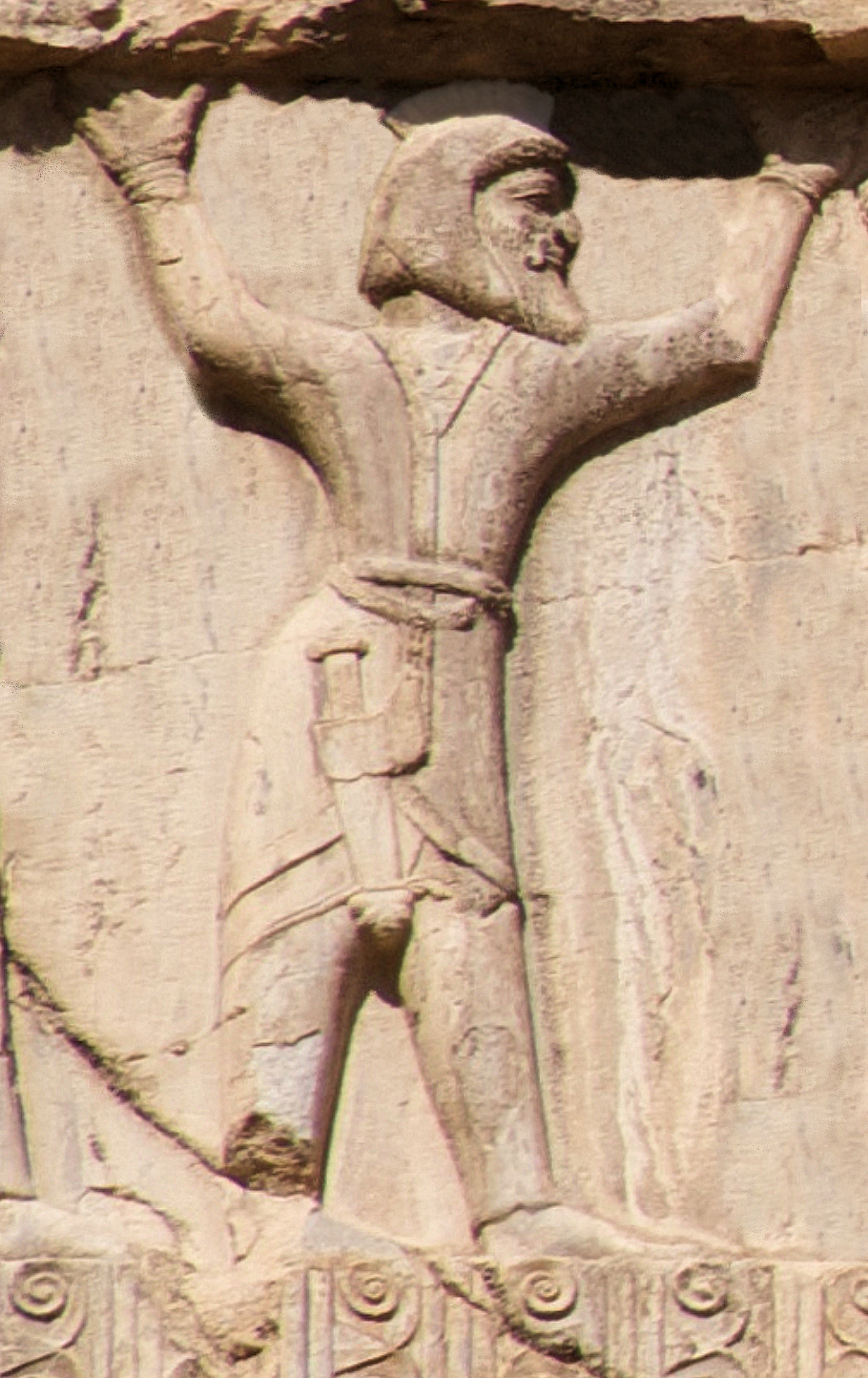
Xerxes I tomb, Choresmian soldier of the Achaemenid army, circa 470 BCE

Chorasmia (Old Persian: 𐎢𐎺𐎠𐎼𐏀𐎷𐎡𐎹 ^{h}Uvārazmiya, 𐎢𐎺𐎠𐎼𐏀𐎷𐎡𐏁 ^{h}Uvārazmiš) was a satrapy of the Achaemenid Empire in Persia. Chorasmia had become part of the Achaemenid Empire in 522 BCE, and it seems to have been ruled by the satrap of Parthia.

There exists an archaeological site in Kalaly-gyr, modern Turkmenistan, in a rectangular area 1,000 x 600 m surrounded by a defensive wall 15 m thick, and an Achaemenid-style palace at its center, all of which were unfinished, suggesting the Persians' departure from Chorasmia shortly after the beginning of the 4th century BC. By the time of the Persian king Darius III, it had already become an independent kingdom. Its king, Pharasmanes, concluded a peace treaty with Alexander the Great in the winter of 327/328 A.D/C.E. Chorasmia approximately corresponds to the modern-day region of Khwarezm.
