= Society for the National Heritage of Iran =

Iranian cultural and archeological preservation organization

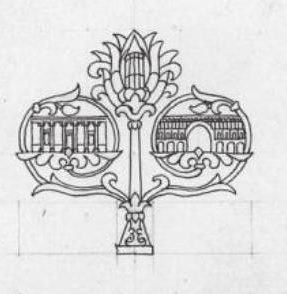
Emblem of the Society for the National Heritage of Iran

The Society for the National Heritage of Iran (SNH; Persian: انجمن آثار ملی ایران, romanized: Anjoman-e Asar-e Meli-ye Iran) was a grassroots political and archeological group created by a group of educated, and nationalistic Iranians in 1922, toward the end of the Qajar era. The society was composed of influential Iranian figures of the time with the overall goal of preservation of Iranian artifacts, archeological sites, and protection of the Iranian culture. In 1922, Iran was influenced by internal and external forces, and the SNH reflects this tug of war between what was the external forces, mainly from Europe, and the internal and social factors.

== Background ==
The early 20th century was a time of discovery and archeological exploration in Iran, while also being the time of social and political change. The Persian Constitutional Revolution of 1906 had reshaped the perception of absolute control held by the Shah during the Qajar era. The outcome was an Iranian Parliament that reduced the power of the monarchy. The Constitutional Revolution was the first political expression of the public sphere that the poets and the literati, now completely out of the Qajar court, had drafted with diligence and steadfast determination.

Foreign interest in archeology and Iranian history had also peaked with several well known scholars from France, England and Russia vying for monopoly and visits. France in particular was very influential in the preservation of Iranian artifacts: the involved French parties exhibited interest in both Persian history and archeology. However, at the same time, they feared that these artifacts would be dispersed and sold. France would play a critical role in the protection of Iranian artifacts but ironically it also wanted an absolute monopoly of all Persian artifacts in Iran. Renowned French archeologist Jacques de Morgan wanted to preserve Persian art and his efforts led to an 1897 proposal to Naser al-Din Shah Qajar to create a National Archeological museum in Tehran.

De Morgan would later change his opinion and advocate for absolute French monopoly on all artifacts found, in spite of genuine interest in Persian artifacts in Iran. This change in opinion occurred after the first few seasons of archeological excavations in Iran yielded numerous rare finds. As a result, he proposed the transfer of all artifacts and excavations to be shipped to France. This attitude was not only unique to de Morgan but it was also shared by all the French emissaries to Iran. In spite of their great contribution to Iranian artifacts, especially in locations such as Susa, France's insistence on an absolute monopoly would lead to other foreign powers being involved in Iran. It would also lead to resentment by secular Iranian intellectuals who did not want Iran's history broken up and exported. France had a highly influential position in Iran, as seen through the influences on political figures such as the Prime minister Mirza Ali Asghar Khan Amin al-Soltan under Naser al-Din Shah. This meant that France could indirectly convince Naser al-Din Shah to abandon the project. Naser al-Din Shah complied and abandoned the project; it was not until years later when the National Museum's construction took place in 1917 under the supervision of Morteza Khan Momtas al-Molk (Morteza Gholi).

It was in this context that after the 1921 Persian coup d'etat led by Reza Shah Pahlavi and Zia'eddin Tabatabaee and unification of Iran, a group of patriotic, educated Iranian figures namely Mohammad Ali Foroughi (Zoka al-Molk), Ebrahim Hakimi (Hakim al-Molk), and Hassan Pirnia (Moshir al-Dowleh) created a cultural group that would later be known as the SNH with the aim of protecting and advocating Iran's patrimony.

== Goals and achievements ==
The goal of the SNH was to preserve, protect, and promote Iranian patrimony. More specifically, it focused on three aspects: 1) Establishing a museum and library in Tehran while ending the prestigious but monopolized French archeology in Iran; 2) proper identification, registration of all artifacts and monuments that were in need of repair or catalog; and 3) preparing and recording a list of all antiques in possession of the government or other groups pertaining to Iran's ancient history. The group would be instrumental in eliciting the proper funds from the Iranian Parliament in order to achieve the aforementioned goals.

=== Architectural Projects ===
The group was able to secure enough funds from the Iranian parliament to remodel and build the Tomb of Ferdowsi as well as being critical in its design and its use of the Achaemenid architectural styling. The project was started in 1928 and ended in 1934 to coincide with Ferdowsi Millenary Celebration. The group also expanded and had close connection to other secular figures at the times including Abdolhossein Teymourtash, and Keikhosrow Shahrokh. The official group members and the ancillary associates were critical in the decision making process and in fact often influenced each other. Perhaps as impressive as the group's involvement was in creation of the Tomb of Ferdowsi in Tus, Iran, it was an equally critical player in creation of the Tomb of Avicenna (Mausoleum of Avicenna) in Hamedan, Iran in 1944. The group was also involved in creation of Saadi Shirazi's mausoleum in Shiraz, creation of the Nader Shah mausoleum and museum in Mashhad, the creation of the mausoleum of Baba Tahir in Hamedan, and creation of tomb of Omar Khayyam in Nishapur. The group was involved in countless culturally themed architectural endeavors.

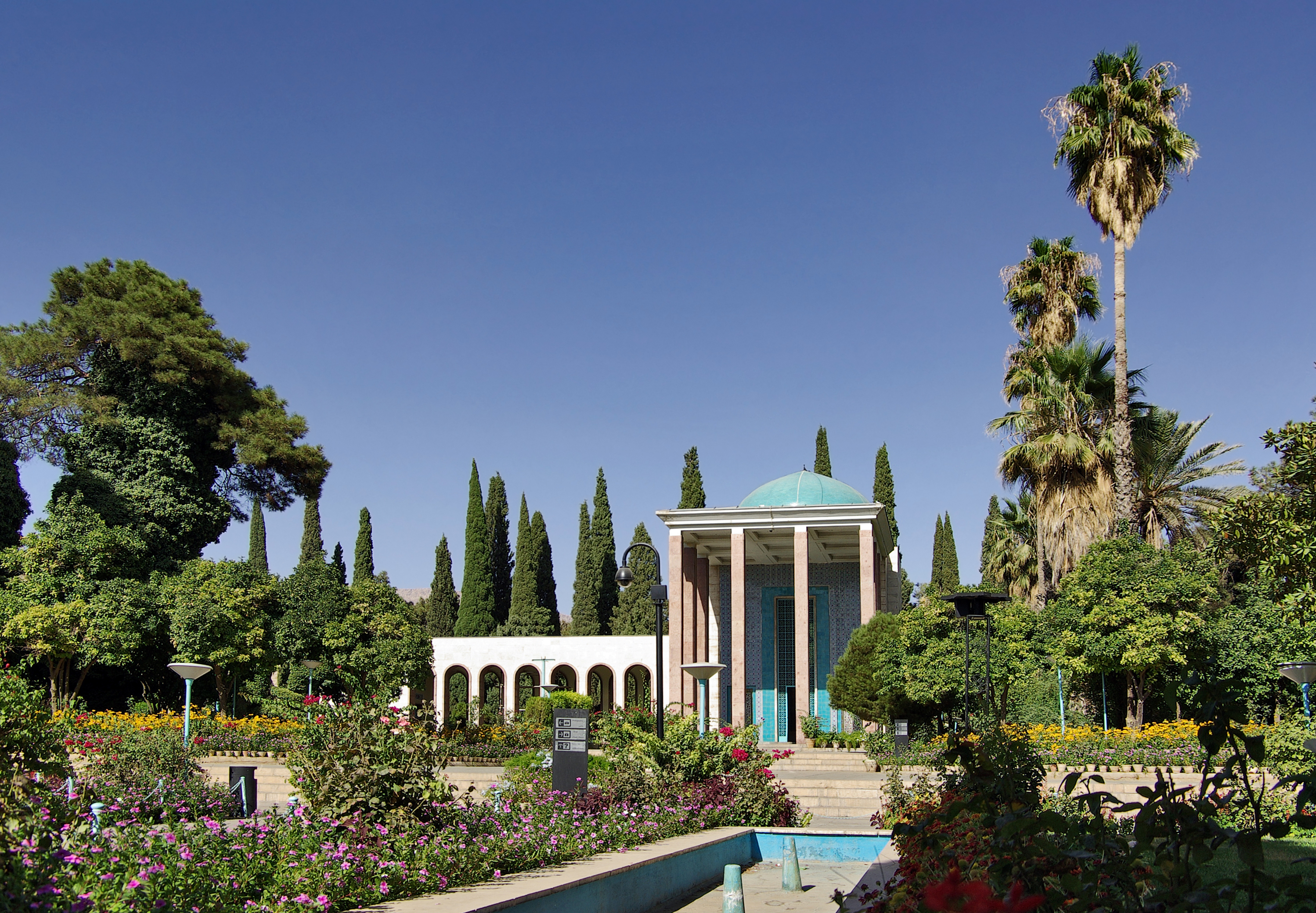
Tomb of Saadi Shirazi in Shiraz, Iran

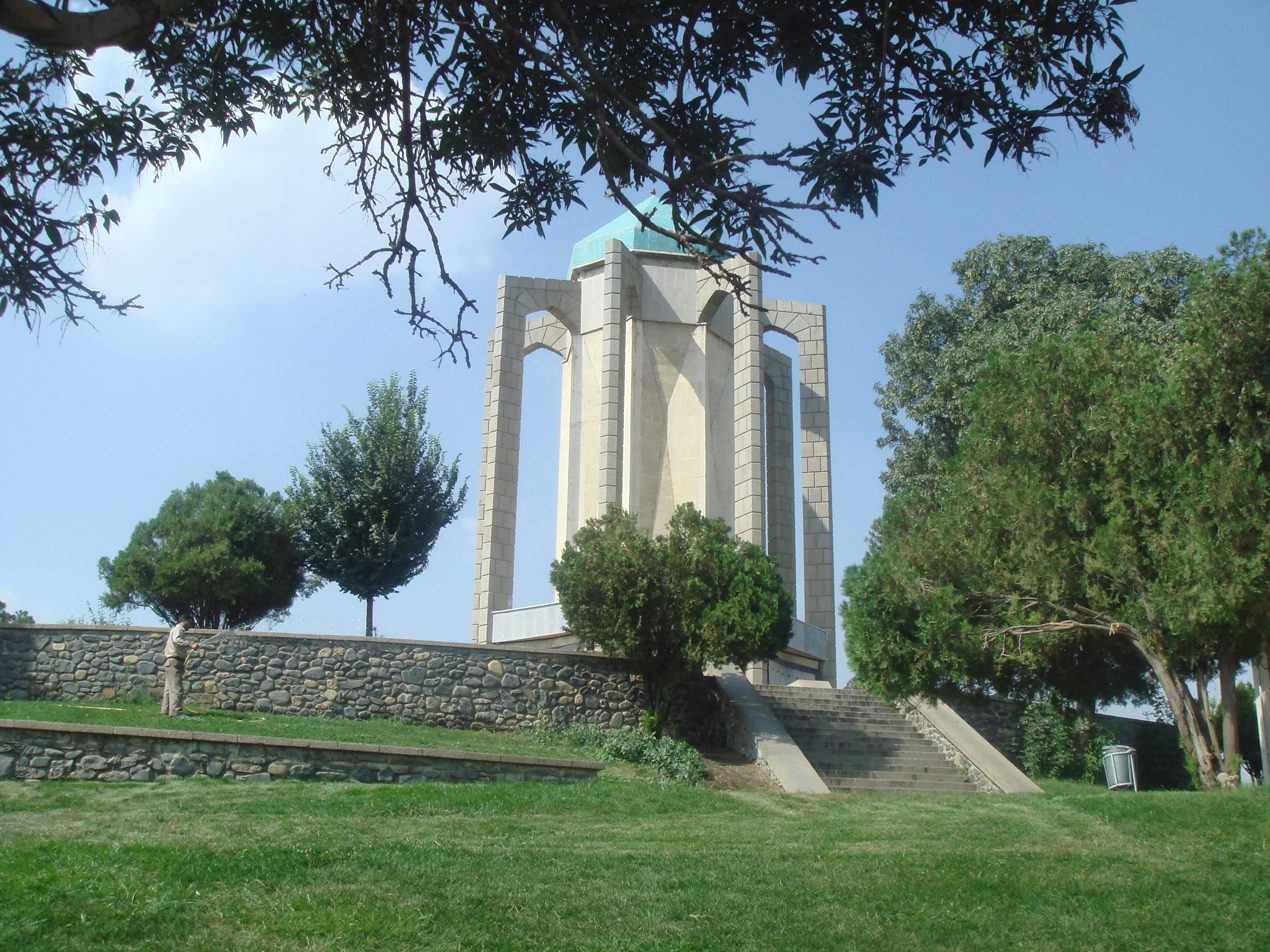
Baba Tahir's mausoleum in Hamedan, Iran

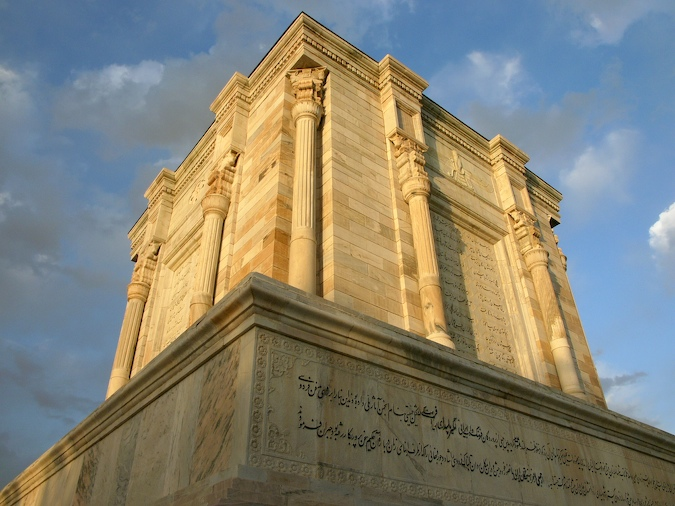
Ferdowsi's mausoleum in Tus, Iran

=== Archeological Monopoly ===
Although not directly involved in ending the French monopoly, the SNH was part of a broader national movement to end French monopoly in Iran and to nationalize the ownership of Iranian artifacts. The group invited speeches by well-known archeological figures at the time such as Ernst Herzfeld, the head of German Archaeological Institute, and the well-known American archeologist Arthur Upham Pope in form of conferences. The first publication of the group was made with help of Herzfeld and was a list of all historical archeological sites in Iran. Reza Shah did not interfere with the works of Ernst Herzfeld or the French archeologists, but he did not show preference of one over the other. However, he did ensure that their excavations went smoothly and that Persian monuments were recovered with the best portion of them being under Iranian ownership. The combined efforts of the SNH and other cultural and historical groups at the time led to Iran having majority monopoly over the recovery of its own artifacts and archeological discoveries.

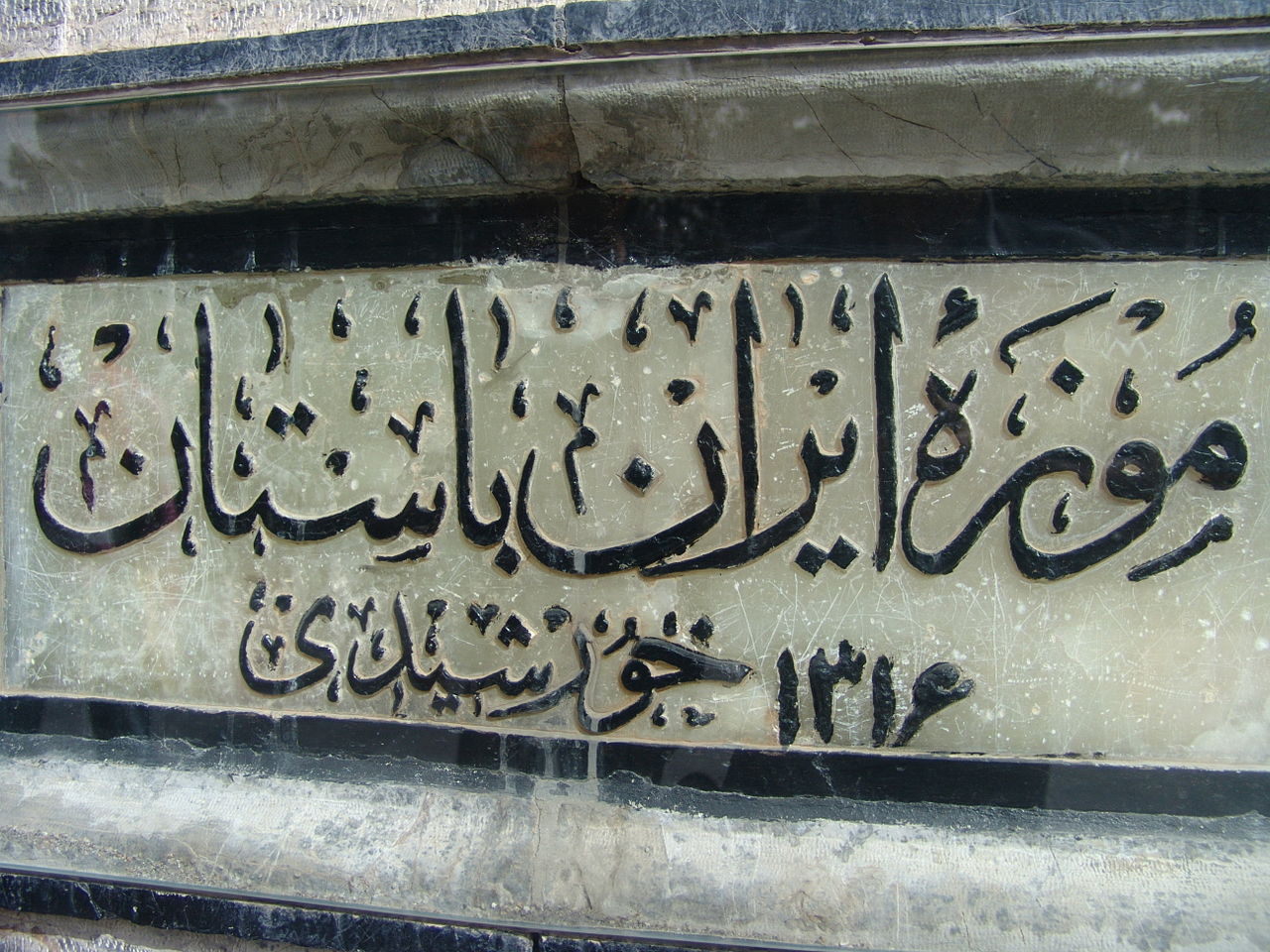
A Persian script decorating the entrance of National Museum of Iran in Tehran, Iran

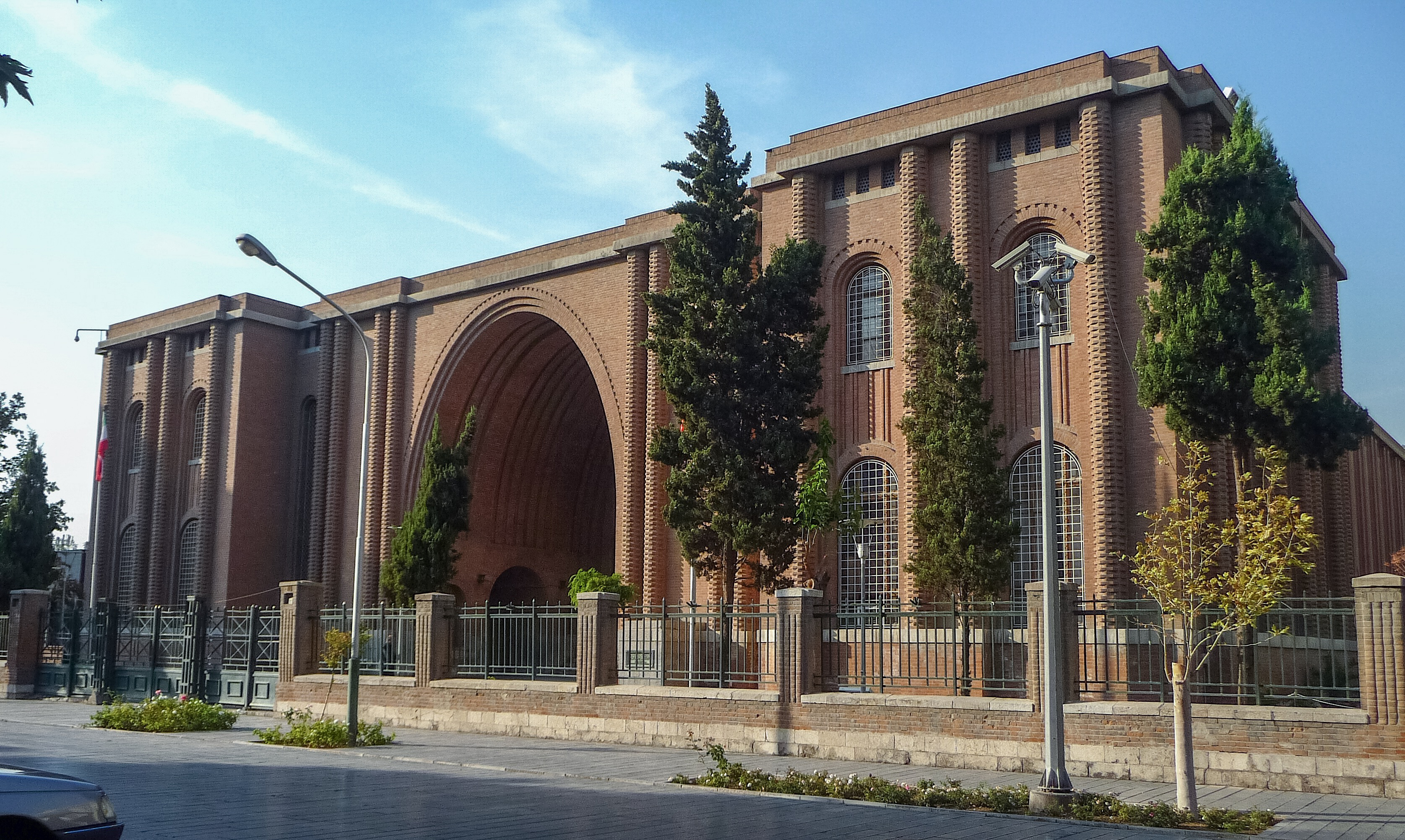
Outer facade of the National Museum of Iran. Sassanian architecture is used.

=== Linguistic Influence ===
Although primarily an architectural and political entity, the SNH also advocated or assisted individuals who had hoped for a revitalization of the Persian language. One major move at the time of SNH was de-listing Arabic loan words and replacing them with old or new Persian words. Even though SNH was involved in publications and advocacy of a more cohesive Persian language, it was intellectuals such as Sadiq Kiya and Ibrahim Purdavus who through their publications, and their focus on Ferdowsi's Shahnameh created a Persian vocabulary that was mainly New, Middle, or Old Persian in origin. Nonetheless through its publications SNH was a force behind removing of foreign words from Persian.

=== Legacy ===
Nearly every significant Persian poet whose mausoleum is in Iran has benefited from the SNH's involvement. The SNH has been critical in the protection and identification of Iranian artifacts and language as well. Iran, having a significant Pre-Islamic history, and an equally significant history after Islam, has always suffered from a dichotomy in its loyalties between a desire for ancient heritage and a desire for religion. The political systems in Iran seem not to be immune to this dichotomy as well. The SNH and the Pahlavi dynasty itself seemingly embraced the Iranian identity but ignored the Islamic identity of Iran, whilst the Islamic Republic of Iran, headed by clerics, seems to ignore or downplay Iranian identity in favor of an Islamic identity.

=== Archeological works ===
The following table denotes the list of mausoleums erected or repaired/updated by the SNH in Iran:

Architecture designed by SNH
Individual	Location of Mausoleum	Current state	Date of construction	Details of changes/improvements
Ferdowsi	Tus		1934	The old tomb was fixed, specifically regarding the dome-shaped structure. The tomb's foundation problems were also fixed. A new cubical tomb was also erected.
Saadi Shirazi	Shiraz		1952	The old tomb was in disarray and had foundation problems
Baba Tahir	Hamedan		1970	Fixing the structural issues of the small old edifice.
Omar Khayyam	Nishapur		1962–63	Construction of the new tomb complex with the surrounding Persian Garden.
Nader Shah	Mashhad		1940s	Extensive repairs and additions of new structures and sculptures under order of Reza Shah in the 1940s, mainly to restore the structure that had sustained damage from the Russian aerial bombings of 1912.
Avicenna	Hamedan		1952	Construction of a brand new mausoleum. The mausoleum placed in the center of the city in a roundabout now called "Abu Ali roundabout." (Persian: میدان ابو علی سینا "Meydaan-e Abu Ali Sina")
Kamal-ol-molk	Nishapur		1940	Construction of a new tomb.
Attar of Nishapur	Nishapur		1950s	Repair of the existing tomb built by Ali-Shir Nava'i in the 16th century.
Saeb Tabrizi	Isfahan		1950s	A new construction of existing tomb.
Ruzbihan Baqli	Shiraz	-	1940–50s	Extensive repairs and additions.
Molla Hossein Vaez Kashefi	Sabzevar		1940–50s	Repairs and additions.

== See also ==
- Ministry of Cultural Heritage, Handicrafts and Tourism
