= Tomb of Ferdowsi =

Iranian tomb complex erected in honor of the Persian poet Ferdowsi

- آرامگاه فردوسی
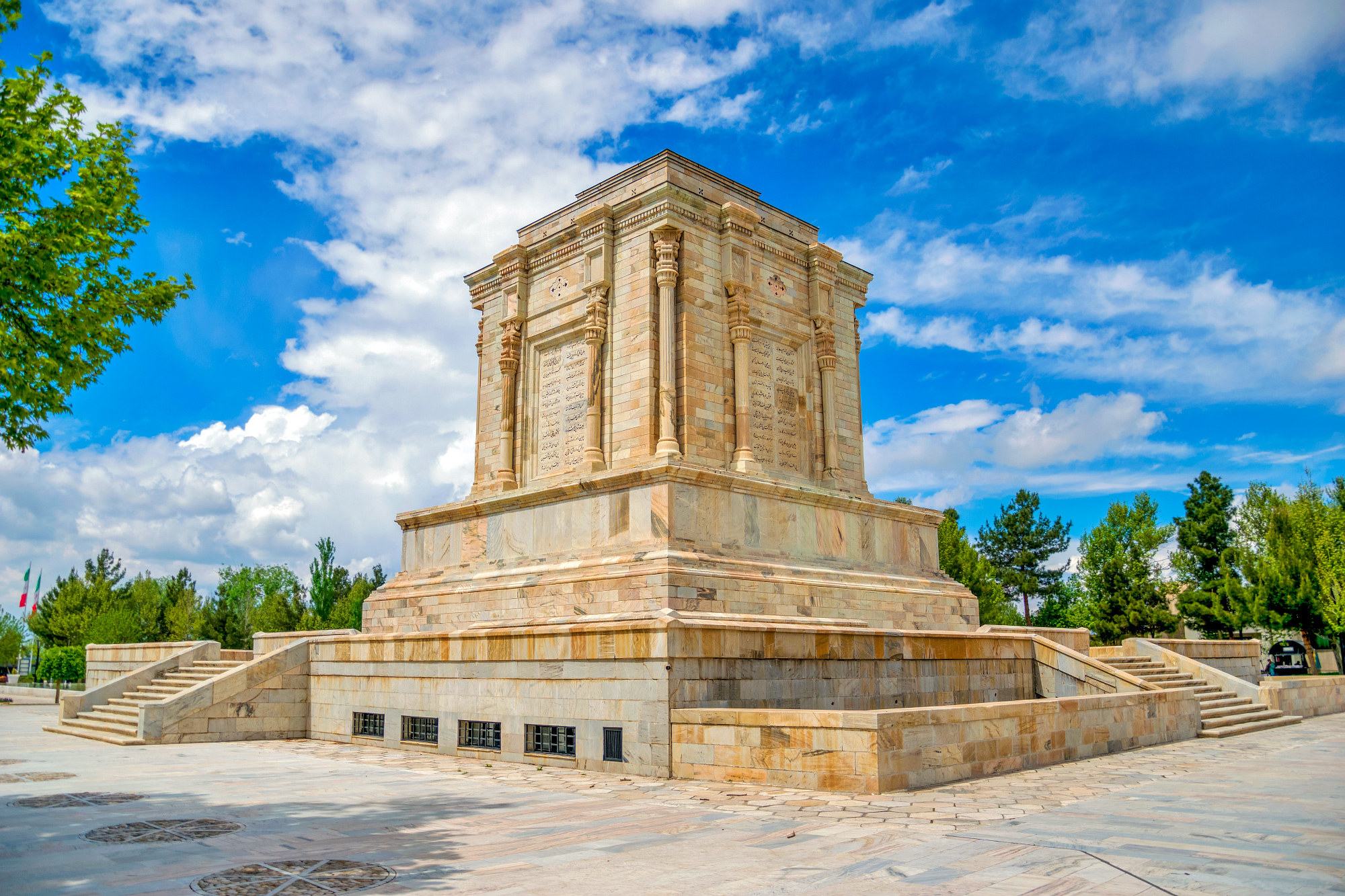
- Interactive map of the Tomb of Ferdowsi area

General information
- Architectural style: Iranian architecture
- Location: Tus, Mashhad, Iran
- Coordinates: 36°29′10″N 59°31′03″E
- Completed: 1934

Design and construction
- Architect: Hooshang Seyhoun

The Tomb of Ferdowsi (Persian: آرامگاه فردوسی, romanized: Ârâmgâh-e Ferdowsi) is a tomb complex composed of a white marble base, and a decorative edifice erected in honour of the Persian poet Ferdowsi located in Tus, Razavi Khorasan province, Iran. It was built in the early 1930s, and mainly uses elements of Achaemenid architecture to demonstrate Iran's rich culture and history. The construction of the mausoleum as well as its aesthetic design is a reflection of the cultural, and geo-political status of Iran at the time.

== Background ==
Ferdowsi, the influential Persian poet and author of the Persian epic, Shahnameh died in 1020 AD in Tus, Iran (Persia), in the same city in which he was born. During his life time, Ferdowsi was not recognised for all his literary contributions. It was only after his death that his poems won him admiration. For hundreds of years, his resting place was nothing more than a minor dome-shrine erected by a Ghaznavid ruler of Khorasan, without any permanent edifice in place in the garden of his house where Ferdowsi's daughter had originally buried him.

In the early 20th century, Iran began to realise his critical role in defining the identity of Iran. It was not until 1934 that the Iranian government, then under the control of Reza Shah, first Shah of the Pahlavi dynasty, recognized the cultural and literary value of Ferdowsi and erected a permanent tomb in his honour. A millennial celebration was also held for the poet, to which were invited scholars from several countries, including Soviet Tajikistan, India, Armenia, and Europe (Germany, France, England). Funds were collected, mainly donations from Parsi scholars, to enable the building of a statue for the poet at his tomb site. The Pahlavi dynasty used Ferdowsi to advance Iran's cultural prestige, but in doing so nearly cost Ferdowsi his tomb since, after the 1979 Iranian Revolution, frustrations with Mohammad Reza Pahlavi nearly led to the tomb's destruction by the revolutionaries.

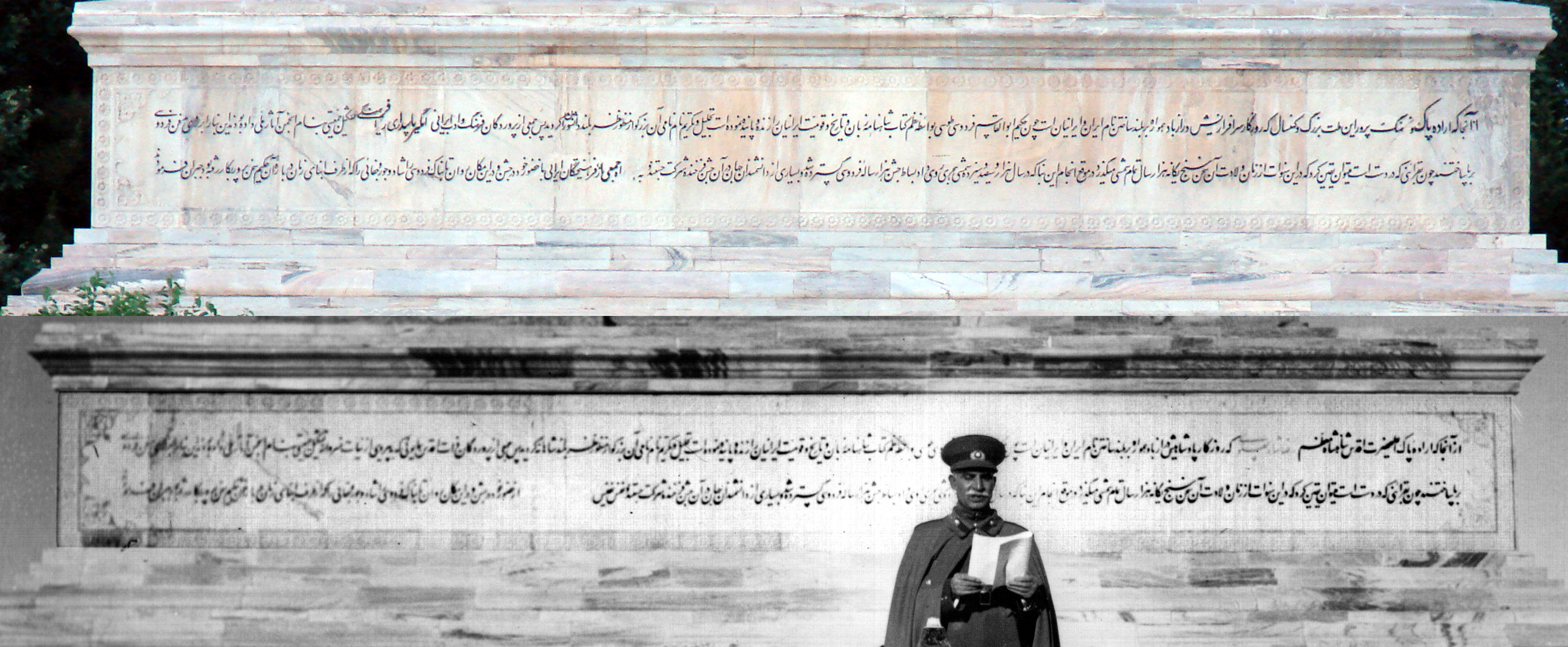
Ferdowsi tomb main inscription. Pahlavi (I) officially opening the mausoleum of Ferdowsi for public visiting upon conclusion of Ferdowsi Millenary conference.

The tomb was originally designed by the Iranian architect, Haj Hossein Lurzadeh who aside from Ferdowsi's tomb also created some 842 mosques, as well as the private palace of Ramsar, part of the decoration of the Marmar palace, the Imam Hossein Mosque in Tehran, the Motahari Mosque, and various parts of the Hazrat-i-Seyyed-o-Shouhada shrine in Karbala, Iraq. The present design of the structure is credited mainly to Karim Taherzadeh, who replaced the old dome-shaped design by Lurzadeh with a modern cubical design.

Ferdowsi's tomb, which resembles the tomb of Cyrus the Great, is built in style of Achaemenid architecture. There is a clear link between this choice of architectural style and the politics of Iran at the time. Four years before Reza Shah came to power in 1922, a group of secular Iranian reformists had created the "Society for National Heritage" (SNH, or in Persian anjoman-e asar-e meli). Composed mostly of western-educated, pro-reform intellectuals such as Abdolhossein Teymourtash, Hassan Pirnia, Mostowfi ol-Mamalek, Mohammad Ali Foroughi, Firuz Mirza Firus Nosrat al-Dowleh, and Keikhosrow Shahrokh, the SNH was critical in obtaining the funds from the Iranian parliament. Keikhosrow Shahrokh, Iran's Zoroastrian representative to the Iranian parliament, was particularly active in reviving Achaemenid and Sasanian architecture in Iran in the 1930s.

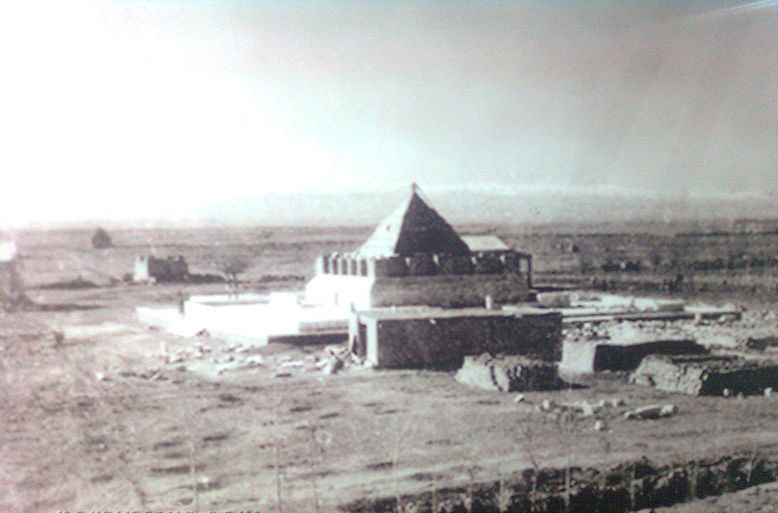
Tomb of Ferdowsi around 1930s, by André Godard and Teymoortash.

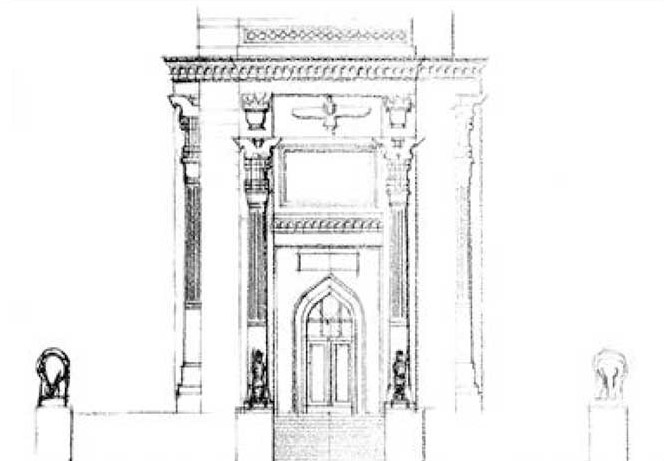
3rd architecture design of Ferdowsi mausoleum, by Taherzade Behzad

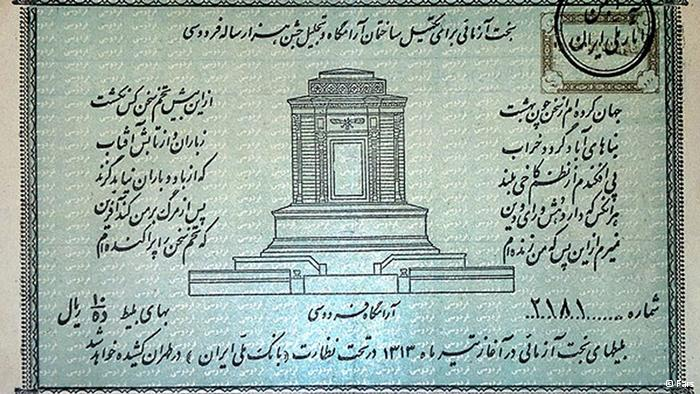
One of the first tickets sold for the Ferdowsi millenary clearly shows the layering structure of the tomb.

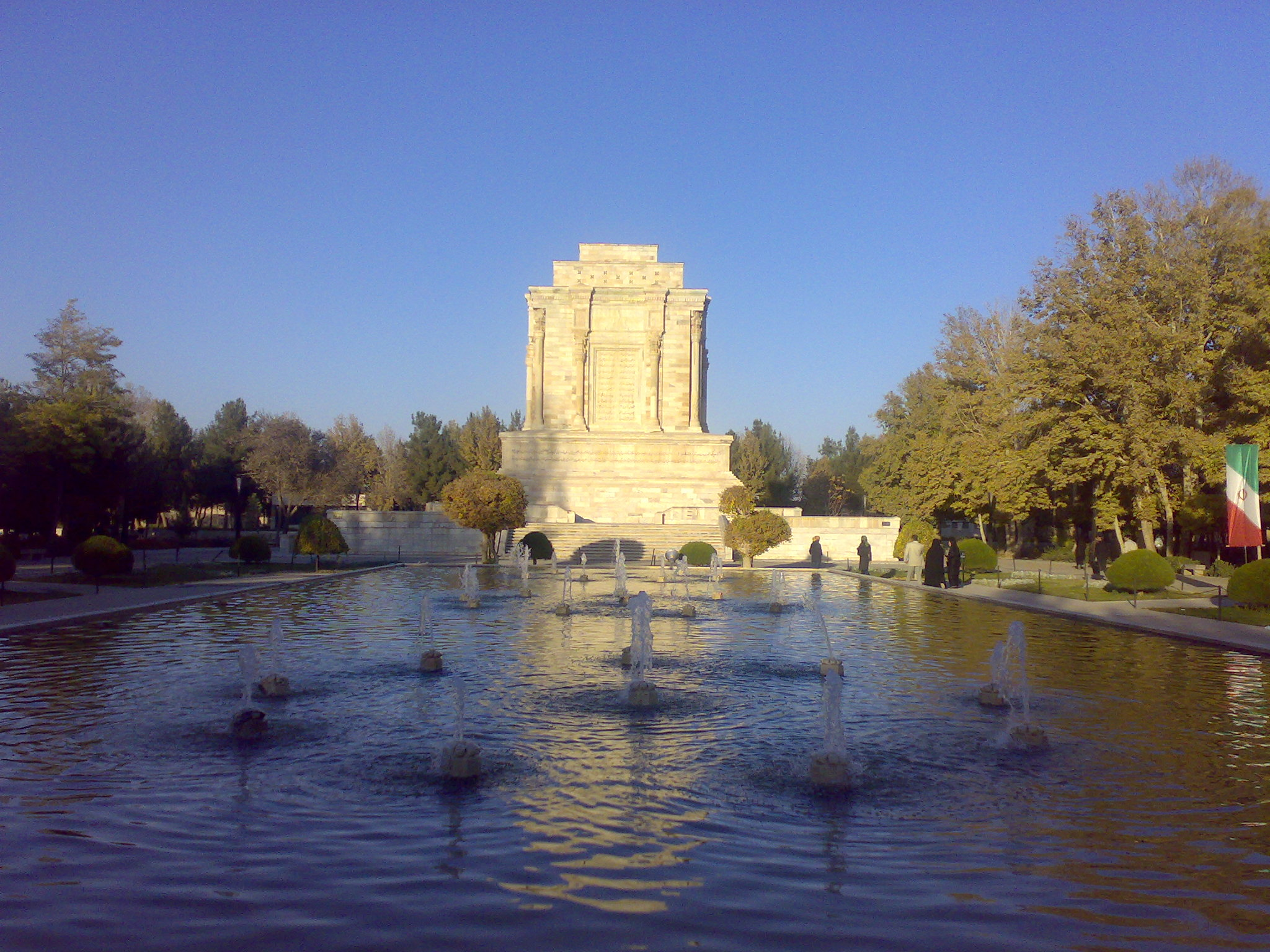
Ferdowsi's tomb, Tus, Iran
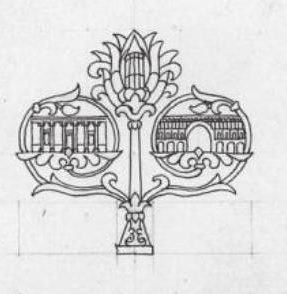
Society for National Heritage

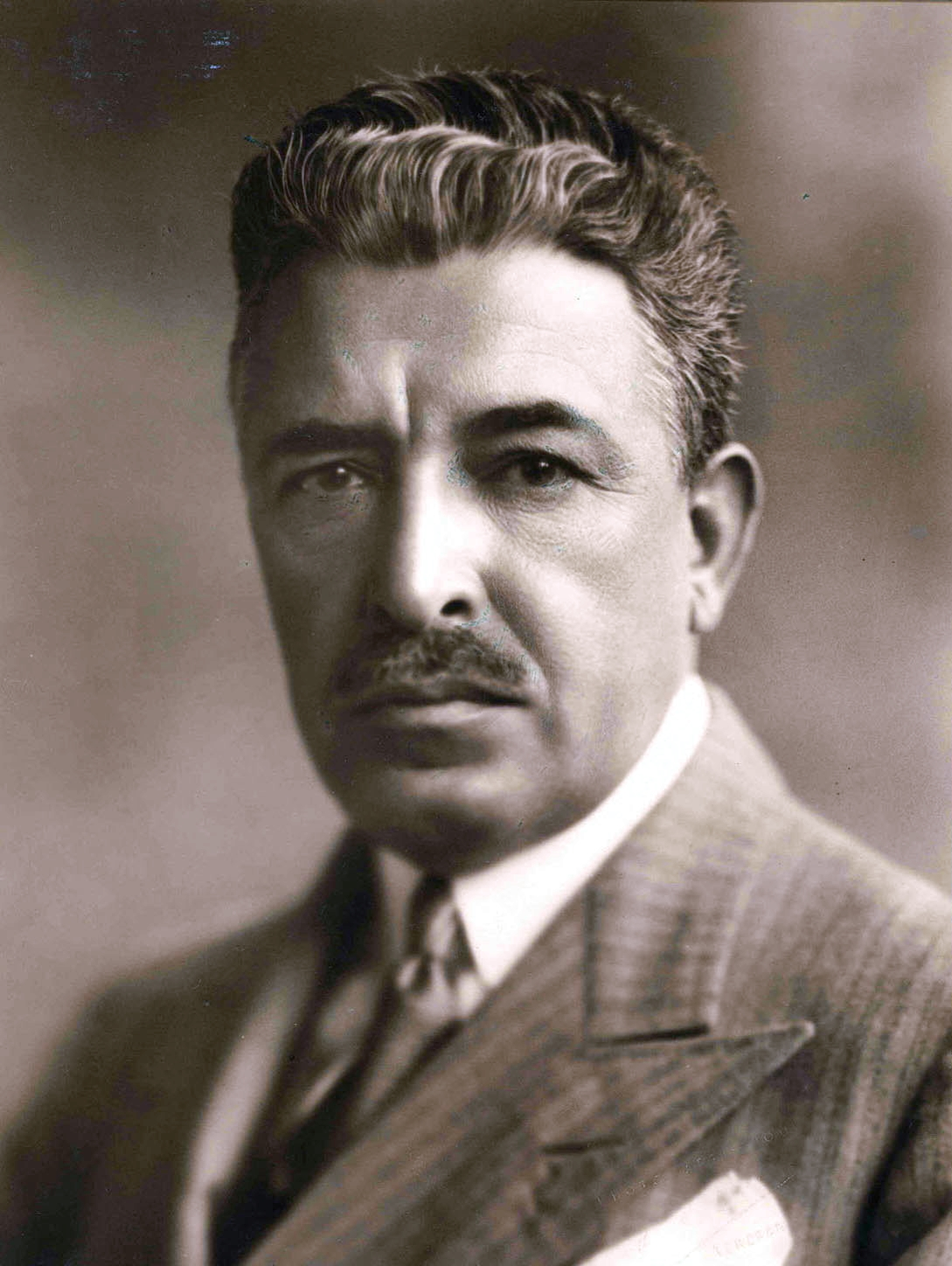
Abdolhossein Teymourtash

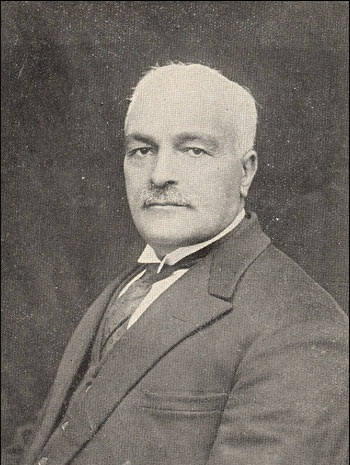
Keykhosrow Shahrokh

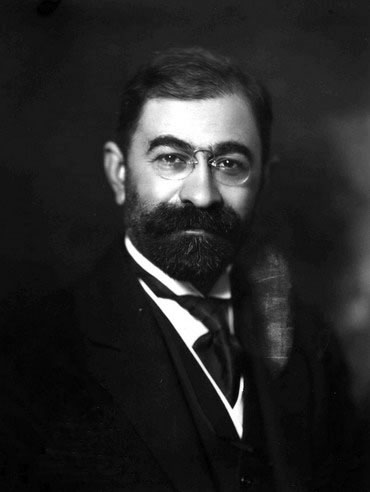
Mohammad Ali Foroughi

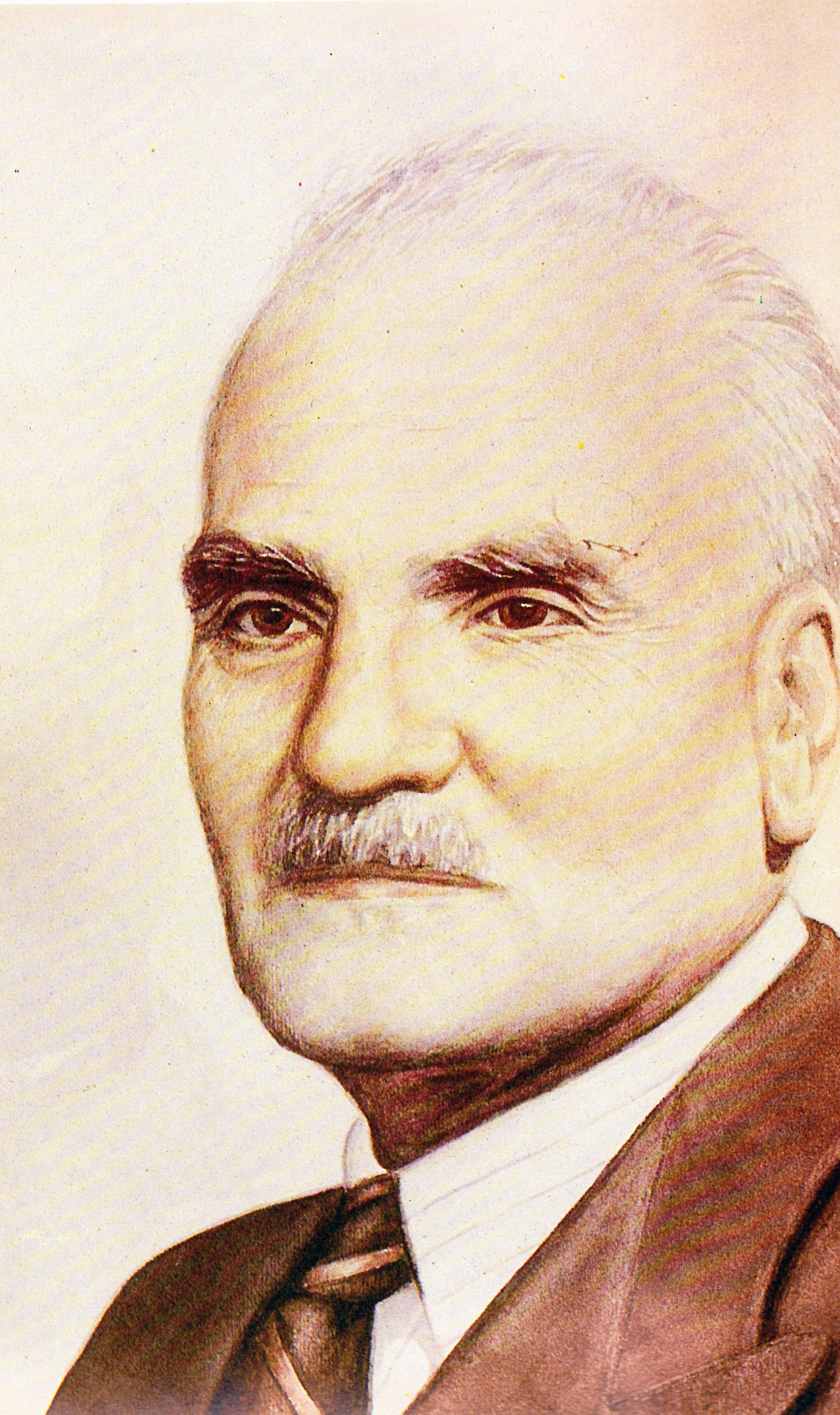
Hassan Taqizade

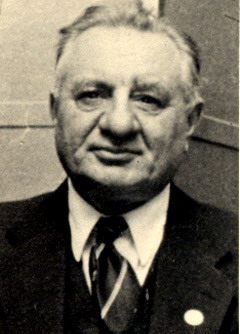
Ali-Asghar Hekmat

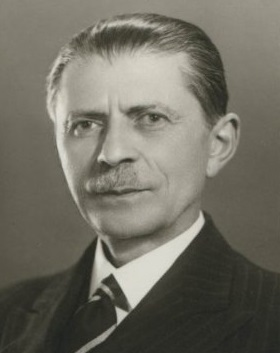
Hoseyn Alaa

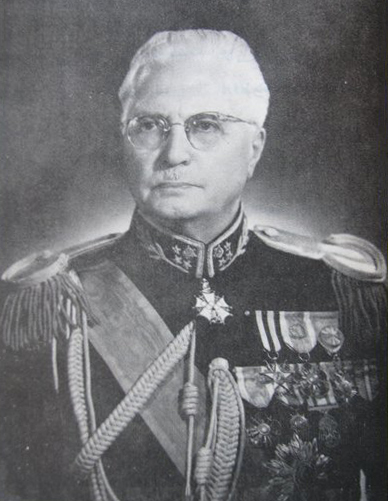
Amanollah Jahanbani

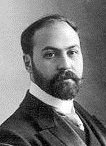
Hassan Pirniya

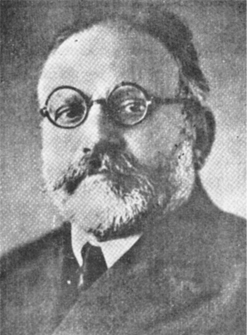
Hassan Esfandiyari

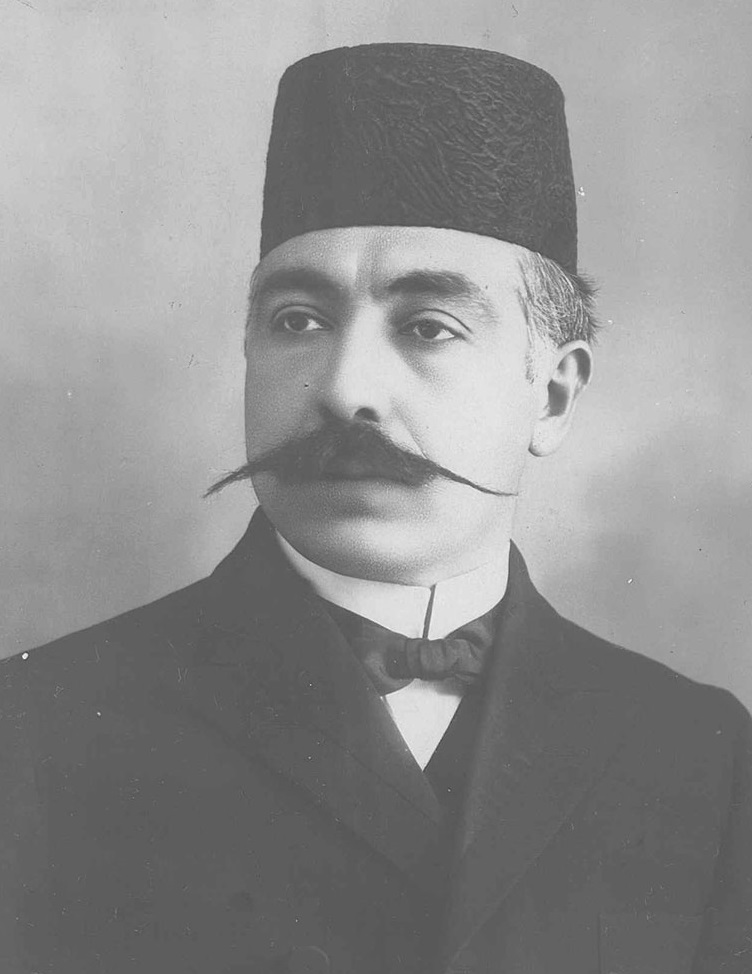
Hassan Mostowfiyol Mamaalek

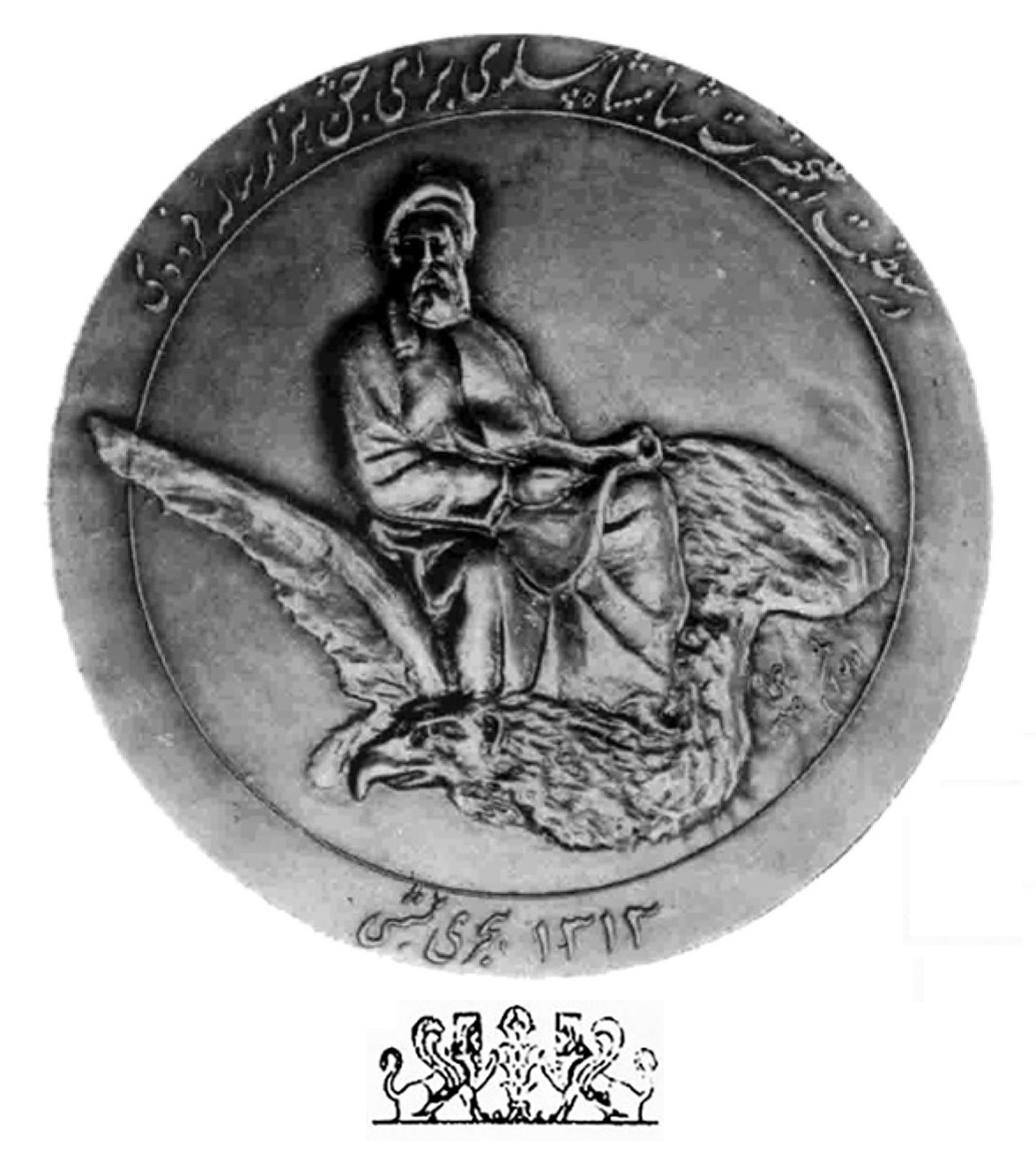
Ferdowsi millennial celebration commemorative medal

== Structural details ==
The basic structure of the tomb is rectangular with a large garden surrounding the structure and interacting with the structure in the Persian style of gardening known as Char-bagh (or Chaharbagh translating to four gardens in Persian). In the center of the cross created by the legs of the garden surrounding it, is an edifice made of primarily white marble. The edifice can be divided into a "wide chamber" that lies at the base and a cubical erection on top, with four pillars surrounding it and scenes from the epic of Shahnameh and text ornating it. The body of the poet is actually interred in the center of the rectangular wide chamber underneath the overlying four pillars cube. There are twelve (12) steps leading from the lowest point of the wide chamber all the way to the level of the cube. The wide base has a total height of 16 m. The edifice has equal dimensions of 30 m on each side.

The following are schematic diagrams of the aerial view of the tomb's wide base and edifice section and their topography:

A unique feature of the design of Ferdowsi's tomb has been its resemblance to that of Cyrus the Great in Pasargadae. Cyrus's tomb also has a rectangular structure seating atop a rectangular, gradually elevating base. This resemblance is intentional as the designer of this edifice intended to revoke the original Achaemenid style of architecture. In fact every other facet of the edifice has a Zoroastrian symbol known as Faravahar. This is not coincidental. There are multiple applications of this in the Achaemenid architecture mainly in Persepolis in Fars province today. The "Society for National Heritage of Iran" (SNH) heavily relied on the use of Faravahar as this was the symbolic representation of ancient Iran since Achaemenid times. Many construction in the 1930s, including the then National Bank of Iran use Faravahar which is not unexpected considering that the same architect that created Ferdowsi's tomb also created the National Bank of Iran.

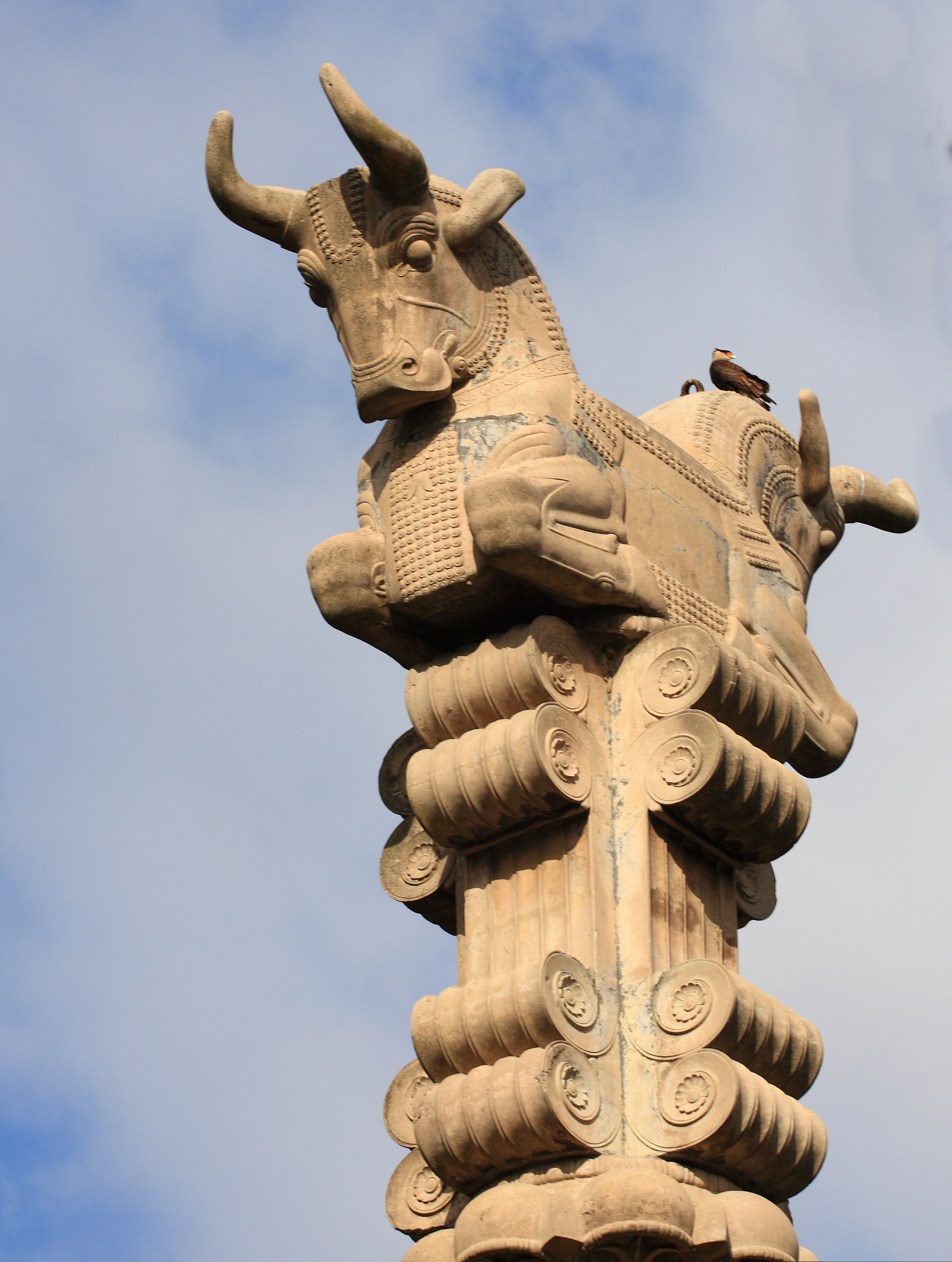
A well-preserved Persian column in Persepolis. Note the two bulls and the ornations.

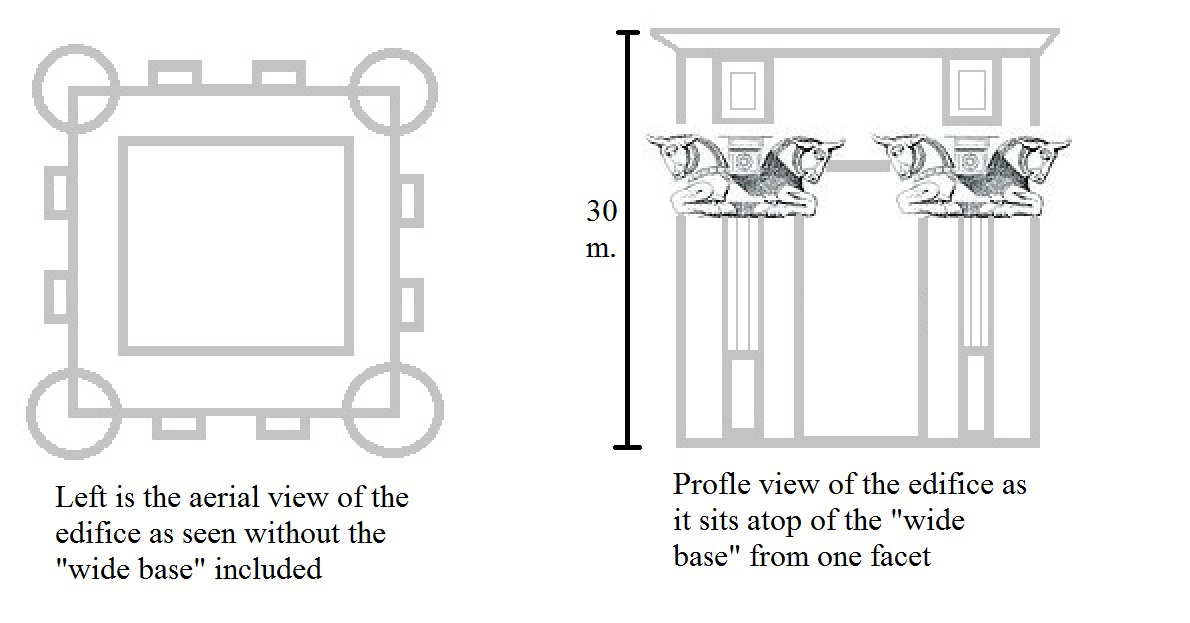
The aerial and the profile view of the edifice as it sits atop the wide base

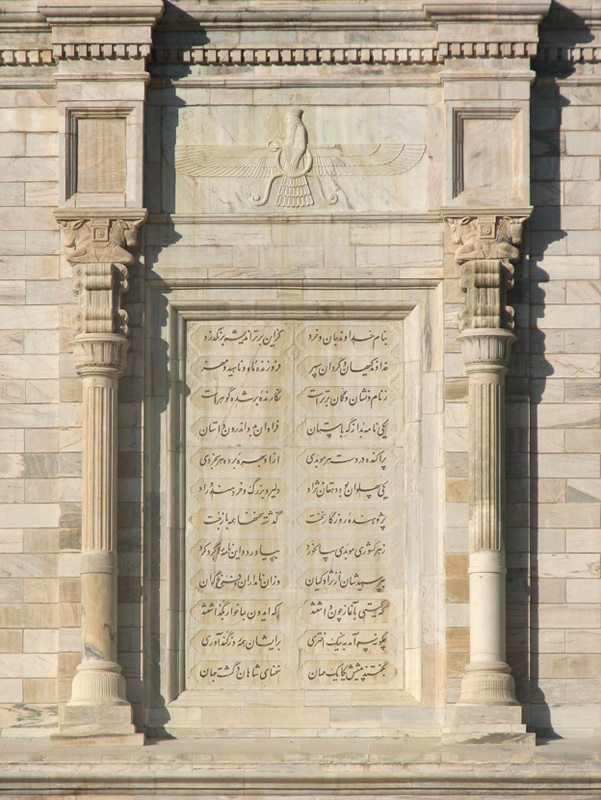
Front façade of the edifice of Ferdowsi's mausoleum; Note the columns and the two bulls.

Photo from Persepolis showing Faravahar and also note the flower decoration. Similar if not exact flower decoration is used in Ferdowsi's tomb.

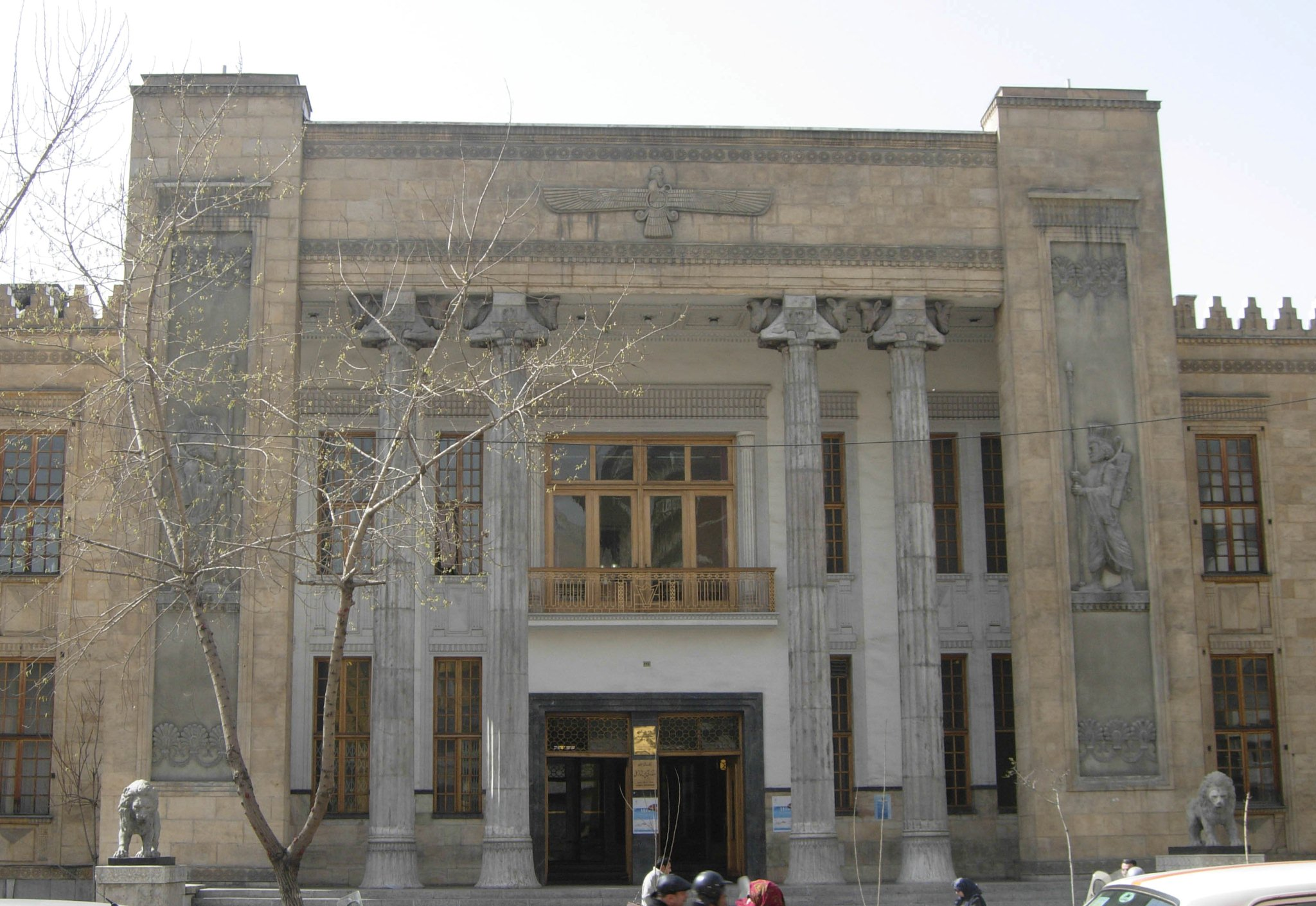
National Bank of Iran in 1946 with the Faravahar symbol on the top.

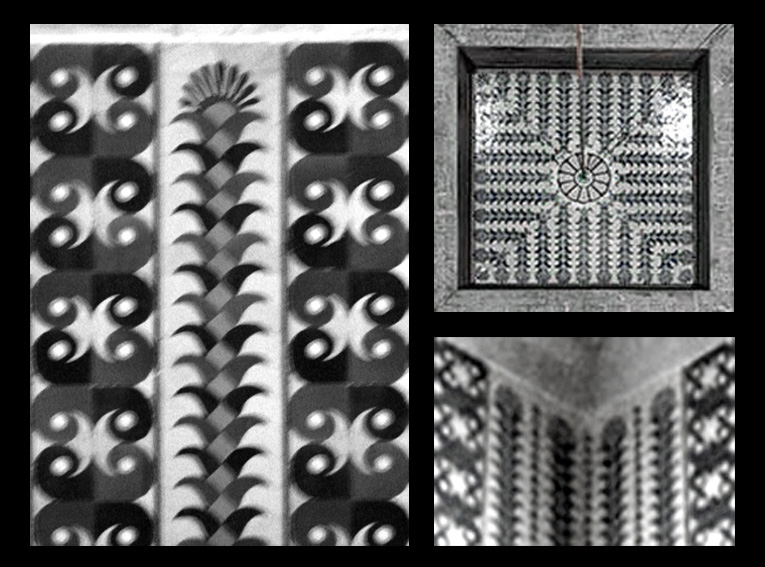
Perspolisic Abstract Patterns of Persian column - Ferdowsi tomb interior

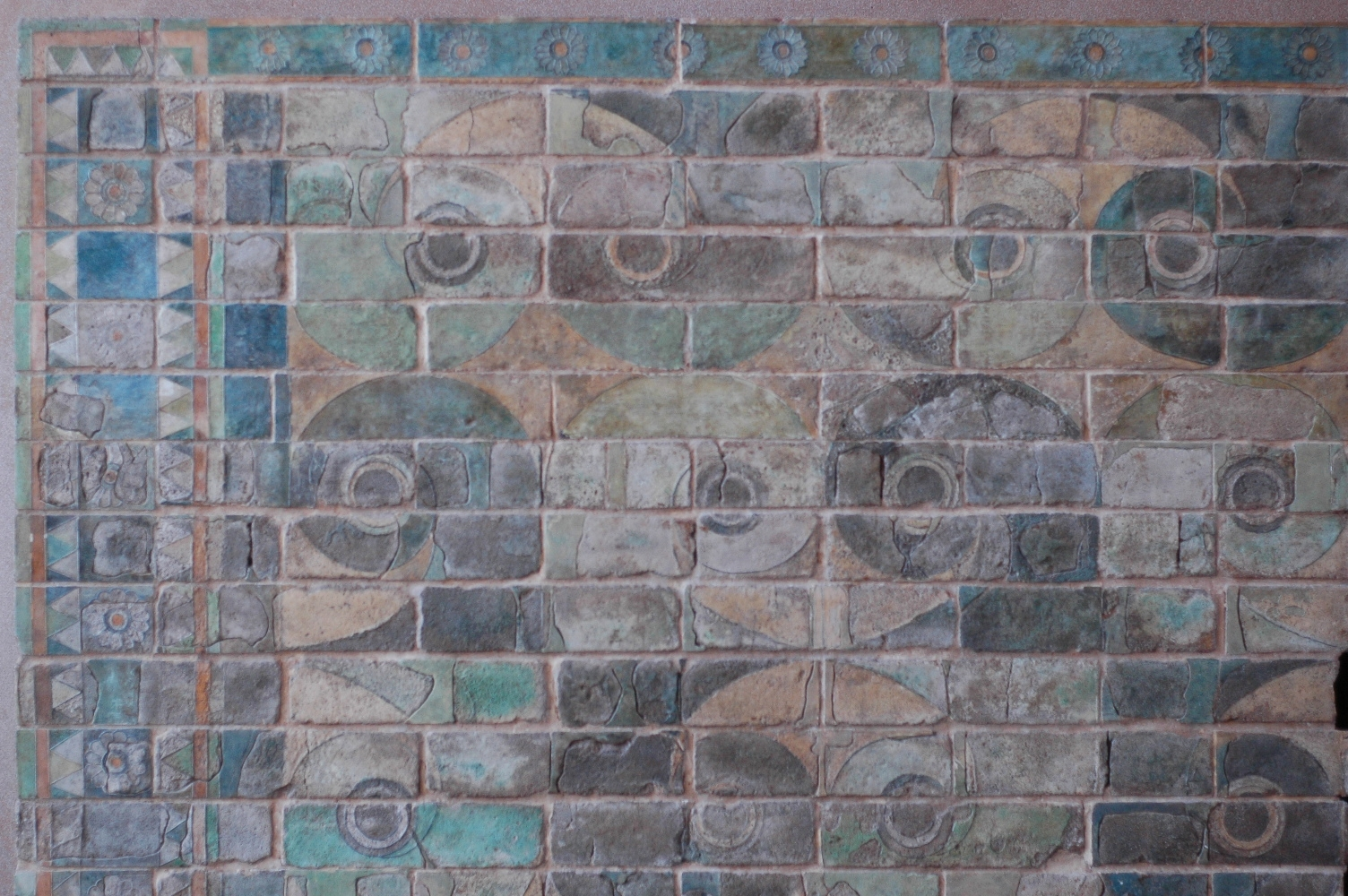
Decorative patterns, detail from the griffins' frieze in Darius' palace at Susa. Glazed siliceous bricks, ca. 510 BC.

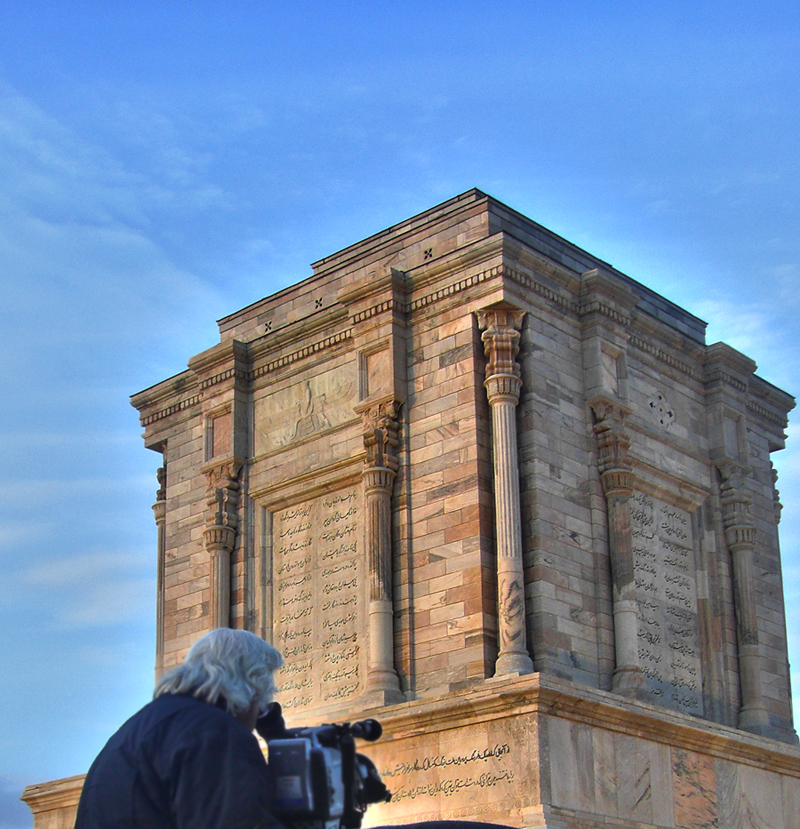
A profile view of the edifice depicting the Faravahar symbol as well as Persian poetry etched in the door panels.

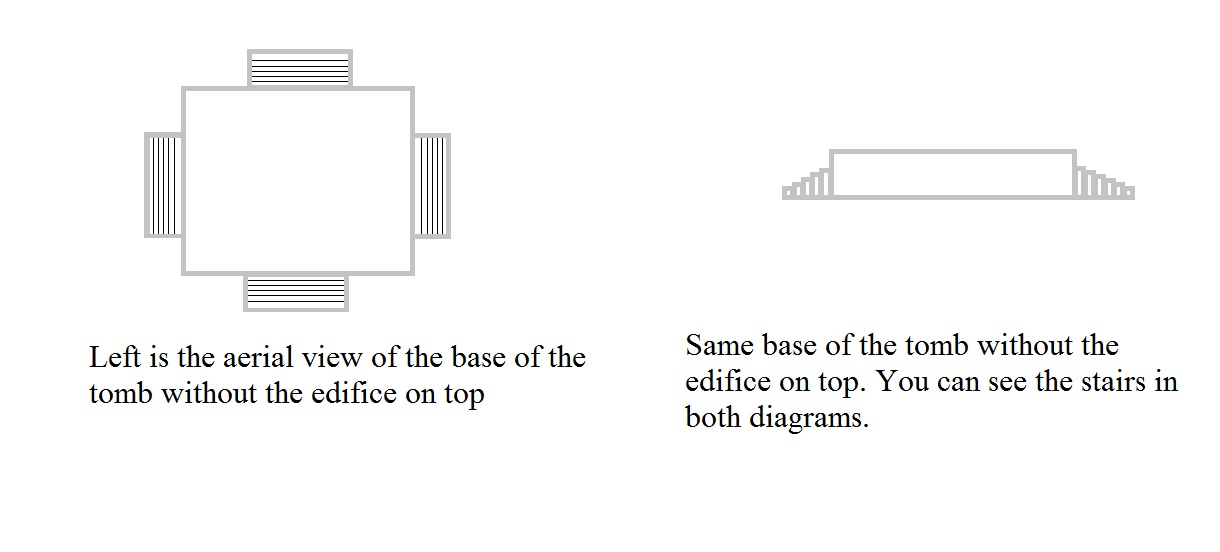
The aerial and the profile view of the rectangular "wide base" of the tomb.

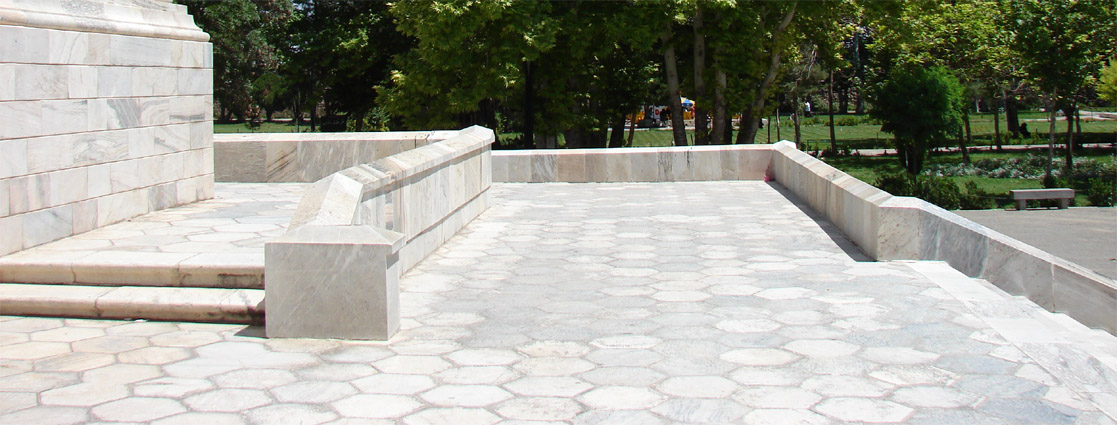
This repeated hexagonal pattern is utilized to ornate the floor of the "wide base".

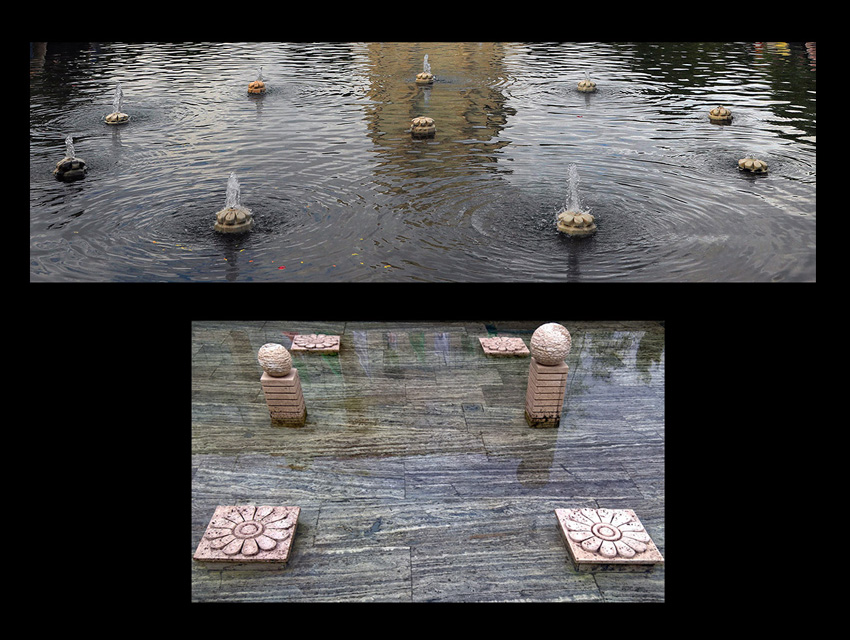
Pond and fountains of Ferdowsi mausoleum and Toos Razavi hospital.

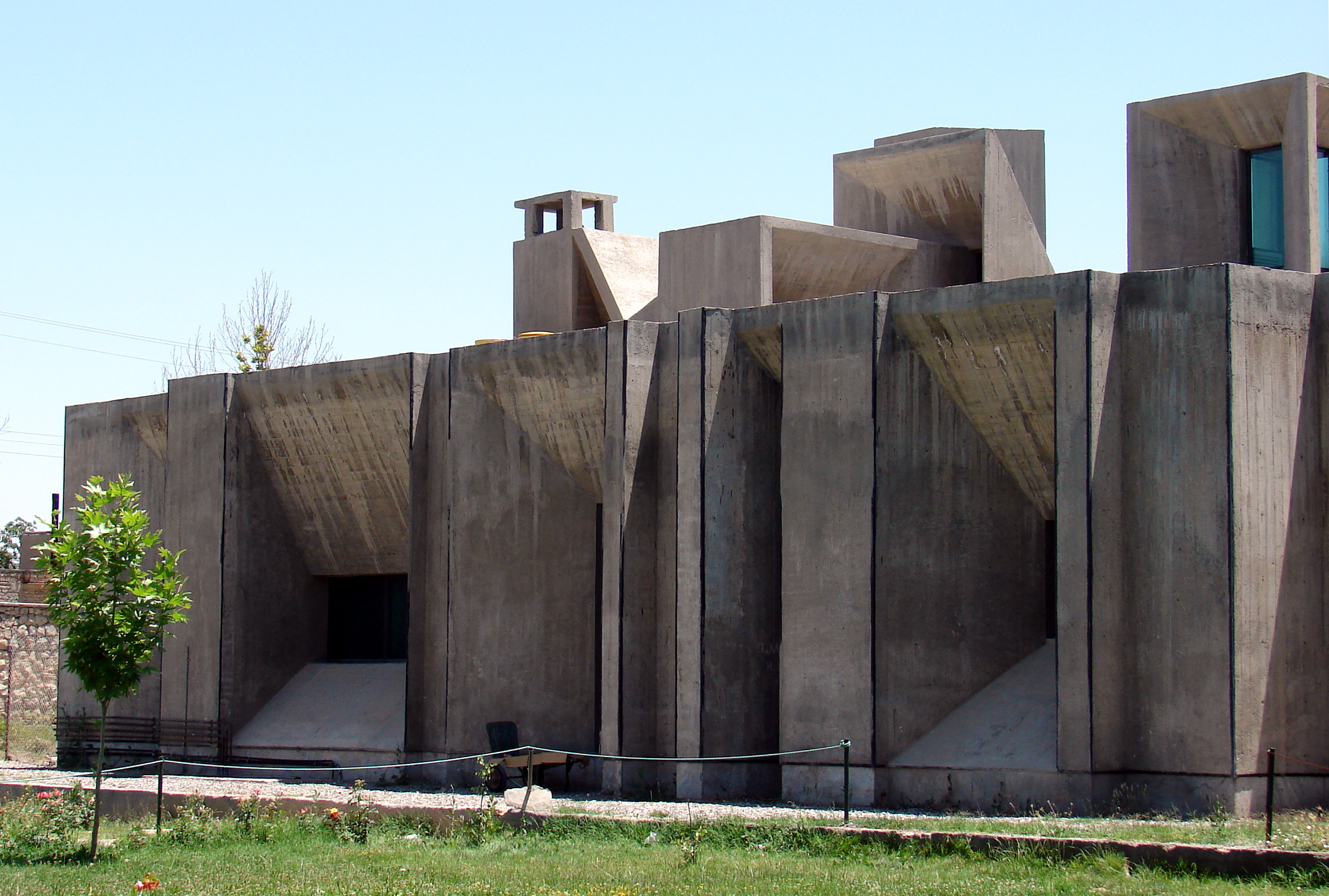
two another buildings of Ferdowsi mausoleum

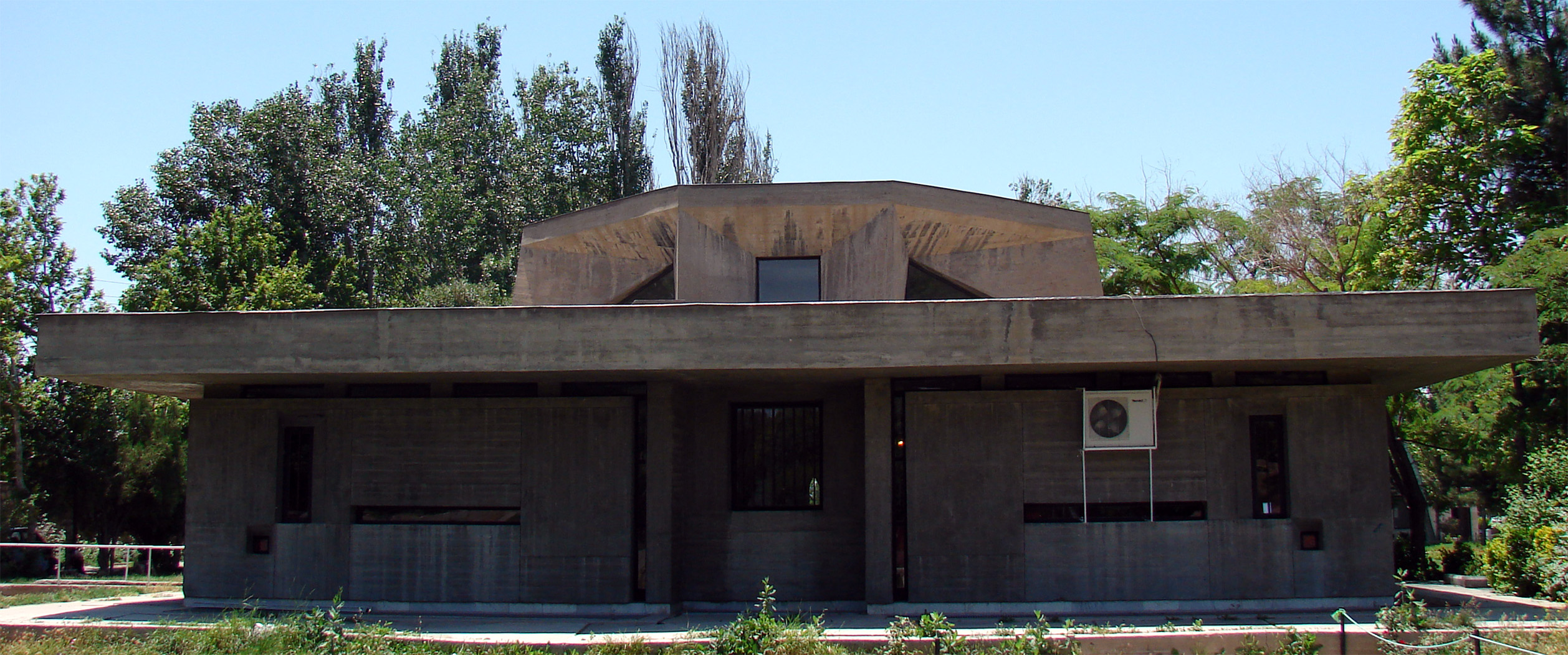
two another buildings of Ferdowsi mausoleum

A closer look at the edifice points out that there are four columns each at the corner of the rectangular structure with two half-buried columns that protrude as deep friezes on each facet of the structure. Each frieze column has a box, followed by a two horn bull sign which is very much similar if not the exact imitation of the Persepolis column design. The columns are ornated with fluting 3/4 of the way down with the last portion spared. The overall effect is intended to create a grand gesture. The columns are as high as the edifice which is 30 meters high. (the edifice is also 30 m wide). Marble decorations are used to ornate the siding and the floor of the "wide base" structure as well the wall. Persian flower designs (concentric flower designs composed of a flower with seven (7) ovaloid pellets surrounding a central circle), and hexagonal marble designs are commonly used in the structure.

Comparison of the Persepolis columns, and the columns used in Ferdowsi's mausoleum:

== Historical context ==
Iran's history has been closely tied to geopolitical changes that has taken place since the establishment of the Achaemenid Empire in Persis all the way to the modern day Iran. Two major events are of critical importance in Iran's history specially its literary history as it pertained to Ferdowsi: Arab conquest of Persia and the Mongolian invasion of Persia.

Ferdowsi lived his life as a poor man constantly moving from court to court, and eventually died a poor widower, having lost his only son. Tus, at one point was an opulent city in the greater Khorasan region but it was repeatedly sacked by Oguz Turks, Mongols, and Uzbeks from the steppe. This and the growing influence of Mashad as a political and religious center within Khorasan shaped Ferdowsi's experience and in many way influenced his writing as Tus lost prestige. Additionally, Arabic had found prestige in lands conquered by the Arabs and there was threat of Middle Persian being lost in favor of Arabic. Ferdowsi's role is critical in that using the fewest loan-words he transferred the Middle Persian (Pahlavi) into Modern Persian (Farsi).

In the time frame preceding the construction of the mausoleum, nationalistic feelings in Iran were high. There was a renewed sense of national identity partly due to the pressures felt by foreign powers including the constant Anglo-Persian political struggle specially over the issues of oil, and partly due to inability of the Qajar dynasty from protecting Iranian lands in central Asia to the Russians and in the east to the British. Anglo-Iranian Oil Company (AIOC) was an important source of contention for Iranians. One journalist studying during this time period reflects his and his colleagues personal experience:

We supported Reza Shah, and we wanted to support his effort to create a modern nation state, to lift us from our backwardness. At this time we talked about Pan-Iraniasm, or reuniting Afghanistan with Iran. We also talked of nationalism. Ferdowsi became very popular partly because of Reza Shah's support for him, and also partly because of the nationalistic impulses the shahnameh inspired.

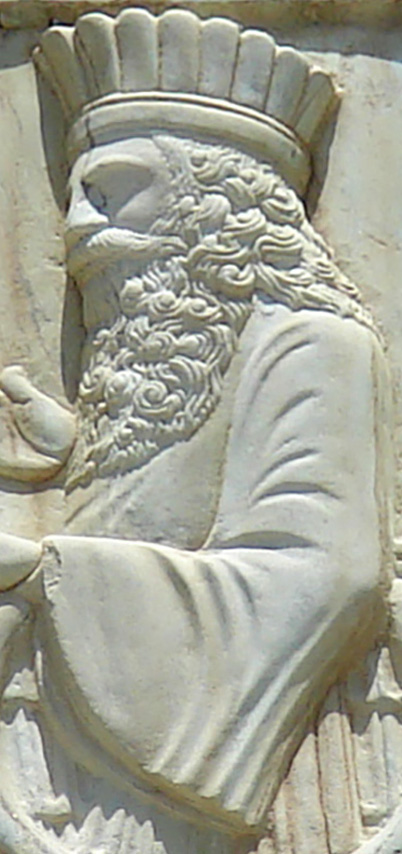

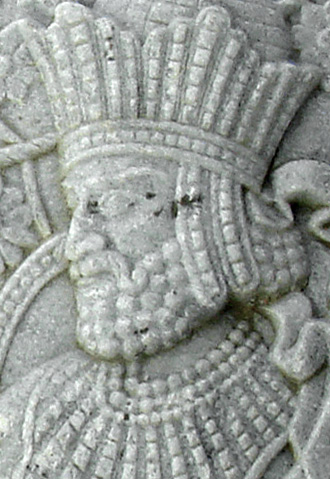

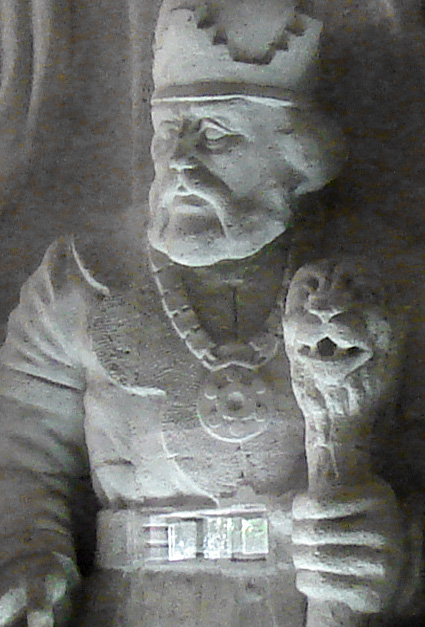

The architecture of Ferdowsi's tomb is also influenced by poet's own personal life, reflecting a constant struggle between the poor poet and the lazy king, and adversity and hope. The Society for National Heritage in 1930s drawing on poet's attempt to revitalize the Persian language, also attempted to revitalize Persian culture and Iranian identity through architecture. This was in many ways taken literally with Persian poems from Shahnameh etched into the white marble facets of the edifice of the poet's mausoleum.

After the Iranian revolution, both tomb of Ferdowsi and even mausoleum of Cyrus the Great survived the initial chaos. One of the most dangerous threats to the structure was that it would be equated with the late Pahlavi dynasty by the new regime and destroyed. It however was not and was instead embraced by the new local government since claims were made that Ferdowsi was a devout Shia Muslim.

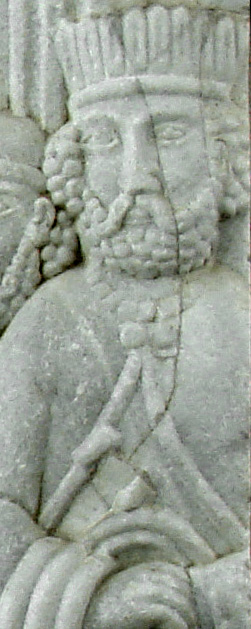
A damaged sculpture of Ferdowsi tomb, by Fereydoon Seddeghi.

== Interior design ==
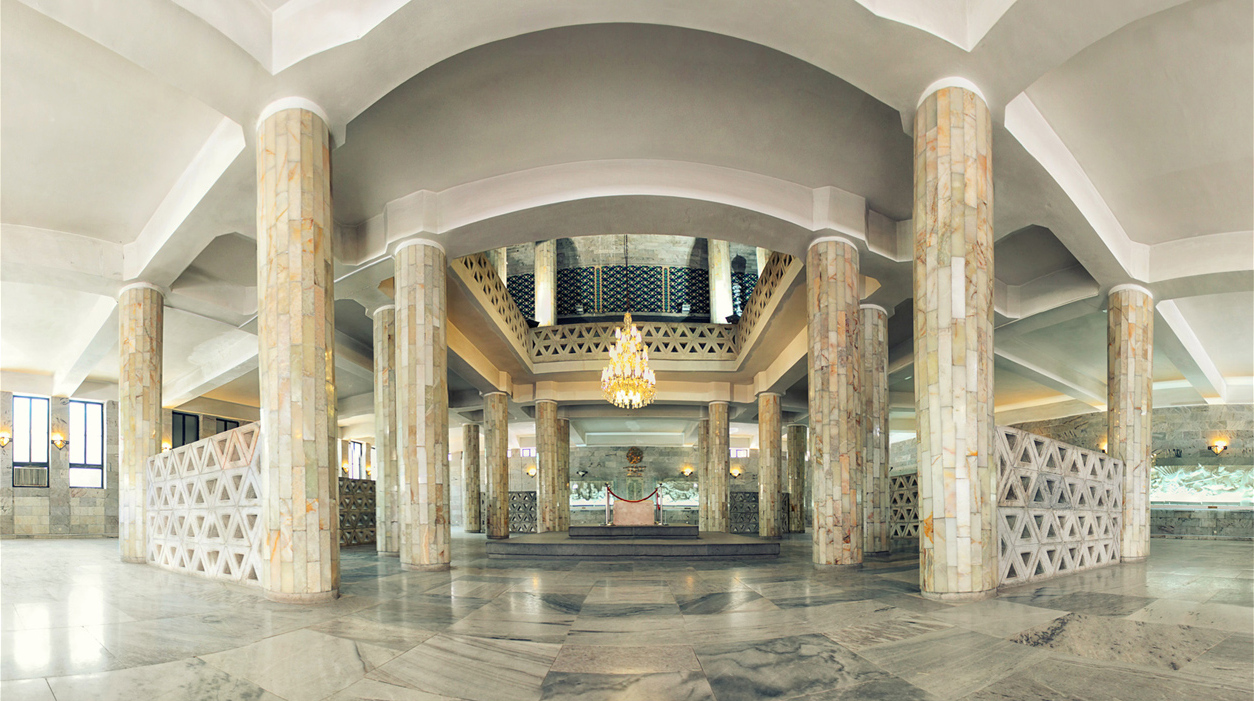
A view from inside

Ferdowsi's Shahnameh inspires tales of heroic act by protagonists fighting against their antagonists. In that sense it is a national epic that encompasses not only fictional and literary figures but also incorporates parts of the history of pre-Islamic Iran. This has led to the interior of the edifice of Ferdowsi to reflect the same heroic scenes. The chief architect responsible for the design of the interior of the tomb of Ferdowsi is Feraydoon Sadeghi who created deep frieze scenes using three dimensional statues each depicting a scene from Shahnameh. Rostam, the hero of the book of Shahnameh is the focus of the majority of the scenes inside of the edifice. As Shahnameh is essentially a text, artistic recreation of its heroic scenes are multiple. Centered inside the edifice surrounding by the frieze scenes and other artistic endeavors is the tomb stone of the poet. Etched in the tomb stone in Farsi (Persian) is the description of Ferdowsi's contribution to the Persian-speakers and at the end it ends by denoting the poet's date of birth, date of death, and the date at which the mausoleum was built.

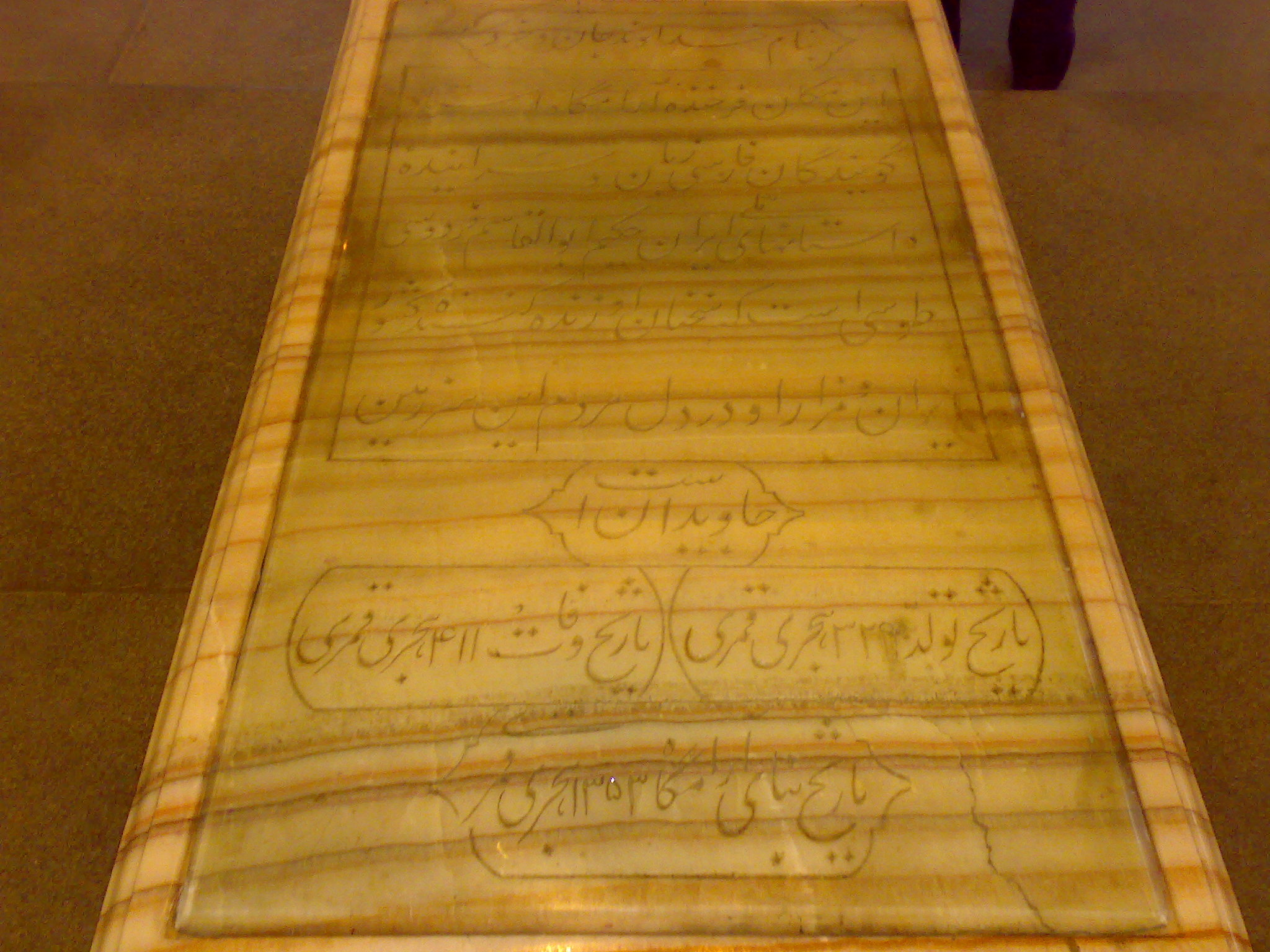
The tomb of Ferdowsi with the accompanying text

The Persian inscription on the tomb:

بنام خداوند جان و خرد. این مکان فرخنده آرامگاه استاد گویندگان فارسی‌زبان و سراینده داستان‌های ملی ایران، حکیم ابوالقاسم فردوسی طوسی است که سخنان او زنده‌کننده کشور ایران و مزار او در دل مردم این سرزمین جاودان است. تاریخ تولّد: ۳۲۹ هجری قمری – تاریخ وفات: ۴۱۱ هجری قمری – تاریخ بنای آرامگاه: ۱۳۵۳ هجری قمری

A more exact English translation:

In the name of the God of life and wisdom. This auspicious place is the resting place of the master of the speakers of the Persian tongue and the author of Iranian national stories, sage Abul-Qasem Ferdowsi Tusi whose utterances are imbuing the country of Iran with new live, and whose tomb lives eternally in the hearts of the people of this land. Date of birth: 329 of the lunar hijra - date of death: 411 of the lunar hijra - the date the mausoleum was erected: 1353 of the lunar hijra.

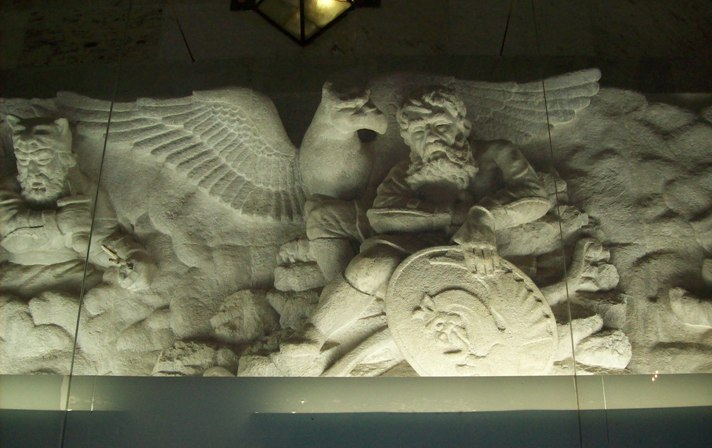
A frieze sculpture scene inside of the tomb depicting the mystical bird simurgh and the hero

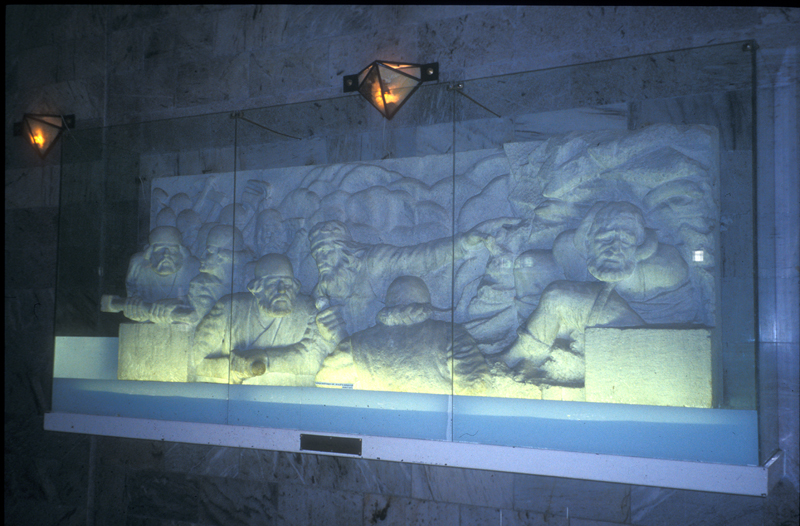
Another frieze scene, this one depicting a scene from Shahnameh.

== Legacy ==
Today Ferdowsi's tomb is one of the most photographed in Iran. Millions of visitors from various provinces of Iran come to see the tomb every year. Foreign dignitaries, tourists, and other Persian-speaking people from across the world also visit the site. The most recent was a visit from the Iraqi tourism minister in July 2013. The site has also inspired many Persian poets including Iranian poet Mehdi Akhavan-Sales who is buried not far from the tomb of Ferdowsi, in his own tomb in the grounds of Ferdowsi's complex. Iranian classical singer Mohammad Reza Shajarian is also buried at the complex.
