= List of cities, towns and villages in South Khorasan province =

A list of cities, towns and villages in South Khorasan Province of eastern Iran:

== Alphabetical ==
Cities are in bold text; all others are villages.

=== A ===
Ab Garm | Aba Mansuri | Abbasabad | Abbasabad | Abbasabad | Abbasabad | Abbasabad | Abbasabad | Abbasabad | Abbasabad | Abbasabad-e Dasht | Abbasabad-e Kollab | Abbasabad-e Talabi | Abdaki | Abdazdi | Abdoleh | Abiz-e Jadid | Abu ol Khiri | Achghunk | Achuni | Afin | Afkasht | Afqu | Afriz | Afzalabad | Afzalabad | Agholdar | Aghzavar | Ahghuk | Ahmadabad | Ahmadabad | Akbarabad | Akbarabad | Akbariyeh | Ali Hedyeh-ye Olya | Ali Hedyeh-ye Pain | Ali Rahmani | Ali Rais | Ali Zangi | Aliabad Musaviyeh | Aliabad | Aliabad | Aliabad | Aliabad | Aliabad | Aliabad | Aliabad | Aliabad | Aliabad | Aliabad | Aliabad-e Chah-e Shand | Aliabad-e Davarabad | Aliabad-e Fakhrud | Aliabad-e Farhang | Aliabad-e Kahak | Aliabad-e Luleh | Aliabad-e Maleki | Aliabad-e Olya | Aliabad-e Sofla | Aliabad-e Zarein | Alian-e Sofla | Allahabad | Alqur | Alvand | Amidabad-e Olya | Amidabad-e Qazi | Amidabad-e Sofla | Aminabad Agriculture Complex | Aminabad | Amirabad | Amirabad | Amirabad-e Pain | Amirabad-e Sarzeh | Amirabad-e Sheybani | Ammari | Amrudkan | Amrui | Anaran | Anarestanak | Andarik | Anik | Anjul | Ardakul | Arianshahr | Arish | Ark | Arreh Furg | Arvij | Arviz | Arviz | Asadabad | Asadabad-e Arab | Asadiyeh | Asadiyeh | Asfak | Asfich | Asfij | Asghariyeh | Ashbak | Ashk | Ashtakhu | Asnan | Aspur | Astand-e Jadid | Astrakhak | Asu | Ateshkadeh-ye Olya | Ateshkadeh-ye Sofla | Avaz | Avijan | Avishk | Aviz | Ayask | Azdak | Azizabad

=== B ===
Baburik-e Sofla | Badamuk | Bagh | Baghan | Baghdadeh | Bagh-e Dehak | Bagh-e Khvajeh | Bagh-e Manazarieh | Bagh-e Sangi | Baghestan | Baghestan | Baghestan-e Olya | Baghestan-e Sofla | Bahamarz | Bahlgerd | Bahmanabad-e Jadid | Bak | Bakhshabad | Bakri-ye Pain | Bambur | Bamrud | Banam Rud | Bandan | Bandan | Bandank | Band-e Now Do | Bani Khanik | Baqal | Baqi | Bar Kuh | Bar Kuk | Barak | Barandud | Baraz | Barenjegan | Barmanj | Barmazid-e Sofla | Barsenan | Barzaj | Bashiran | Basiran | Basnabad | Bavik-e Vosta | Baymargh | Behdan | Beheshtabad | Beskabad | Beynabad | Bezakshan | Bichand | Bicheh | Bid Kard Gam | Bid | Bidak | Bid-e Kabkan | Bidesgan | Bidesk | Bidesk-e Monond | Bidestan | Bidmeshk | Bidmeshk | Bidokht | Bidokht | Bihud | Bijar | Bimad | Binabaj | Birjand | Bisheh | Bisheh | Bisheh | Bistkonj | Bizhaem | Bizhanabad | Bohnabad | Bojd | Bolanjab | Bon Khunik | Bonarg | Bondeshk | Boniabad | Bonyab | Boqrai | Borj-e Mohammadan | Borj-e Ziad | Borun | Borzaj | Boshgaz | Boshruyeh | Bostaq | Bovaj | Boz Bisheh | Boz Qonj | Boz Quch-e Olya | Boz Quch-e Sofla | Boznabad-e Jadid | Buabad | Bureng | Burgan-e Bala | Burgan-e Pain | Buri | Bushad | Buteh Zirg

=== C ===
Chadeh | Chah Bargi | Chah Deraz | Chah Howz | Chah Jamali | Chah Kand | Chah Khoshkan | Chah Khu | Chah Kord | Chahak | Chahar Farsakh | Chahdashi | Chah-e Abul | Chah-e Akhundshafi | Chah-e Ali Akbar Shahzehi | Chah-e Ali Mohammadi | Chah-e Ali | Chah-e Allahdad | Chah-e Amiq Hashemi Nezhad | Chah-e Amiq Rushni | Chah-e Amiq Shahidjan Mirza | Chah-e Amiq Shomareh Do Talbabad | Chah-e Amiq Shomareh Yek Talbabad | Chah-e Amiq | Chah-e Arabha | Chah-e Ashair Hajji Nabi Hoseyni | Chah-e Ashair Mollah Abbas Hoseyni | Chah-e Askari | Chah-e Baneh | Chah-e Baneh | Chah-e Bidak | Chah-e Buk | Chah-e Bunak | Chah-e Chalehi | Chah-e Chanag | Chah-e Dahaneh | Chah-e Doghal | Chah-e Eslamabad | Chah-e Feyzabad | Chah-e Ghias | Chah-e Gonbad Talkh | Chah-e Hajji Moqim | Chah-e Hamzeh | Chah-e Harif | Chah-e Hasan Chari | Chah-e Hasan Samuri | Chah-e Jam Kord | Chah-e Jangal Bani | Chah-e Jars | Chah-e Kalanteh | Chah-e Kanganiha | Chah-e Karim | Chah-e Karimdad | Chah-e Kashmir | Chah-e Kazab | Chah-e Kazeh | Chah-e Khazai | Chah-e Khush Nari | Chah-e Kuran Vakilabad | Chah-e Laf | Chah-e Lisi | Chah-e Madani | Chah-e Mazar | Chah-e Mohammad Ali Gol | Chah-e Mohammad Sabagh | Chah-e Musa Bumadi | Chah-e Mutur Hajji Abbas Ardani | Chah-e Mutur Shahid Ahmadarduni | Chah-e Mutur Shomareh 6 Tareh va Tuseh | Chah-e Nabi | Chah-e Namakzar | Chah-e Now | Chah-e Palami | Chah-e Polond | Chah-e Panhani | Chah-e Paniri | Chah-e Panj Tan ol Aba | Chah-e Pansar | Chah-e Paskaleh | Chah-e Payih | Chah-e Piruzabad | Chah-e Puzeh Kaji | Chah-e Qaleh Rig | Chah-e Qasem Pur | Chah-e Qasemi | Chah-e Qorban | Chah-e Rakateyha | Chah-e Razmandegan | Chah-e Rostami | Chah-e Sabz | Chah-e Shahid Ashrafi Asfahani | Chah-e Shahid Madars | Chah-e Shahid Shahpur | Chah-e Shirin | Chah-e Shomareh 5 Chah Fazli | Chah-e Shomareh 5 Tareh Tuseh Dasht Sahlabad | Chah-e Shomareh 6 Chah Salari | Chah-e Shomareh 7 Mohammad Hoseyni | Chah-e Shulak | Chah-e Shulak | Chah-e Shur Qonbari | Chah-e Shur | Chah-e Shur | Chah-e Shur | Chah-e Siah | Chah-e Siah | Chah-e Taleb | Chah-e Taleb Mokhtari | Chah-e Talqori | Chah-e Tarikhi | Chah-e Vahdatabad-e Khomeyni | Chah-e Yusof | Chah-e Zalak | Chah-e Zard | Chah-e Zard | Chah-e Zard | Chah-e Zardak | Chah-e Zeyayi | Chah-e Zini Ha | Chahkand | Chahkand | Chahkandak | Chahkand-e Gol | Chahkand-e Mud | Chahkanduk | Chahkanduk | Chaj | Chajakhu | Chak | Chakik | Chalunak | Chardeh-ye Bala | Chardeh-ye Pain | Charmeh | Chedan | Chenaran-e Jadid | Chenesht | Cheshmeh Bid | Cheshmeh Raj | Cheshmeh Zangi | Cheshmeh Zard | Cheshmeh Zard | Cheshmeh-ye Ashtareza | Cheshmeh-ye Gav | Cheshmeh-ye Gazu | Cheshmeh-ye Khanom | Cheshmeh-ye Mulid | Cheshmeh-ye Sarmandali | Cheshmeh-ye Seyyed | Chugan

=== D ===
Daderan | Daftabad-e Olya | Dahan Rud | Dahan Rud | Dahan-e Tangal | Dahaneh | Dahaneh-ye Chah | Dam Rubah | Damdameh | Damdari Rezania | Dar Eshkaft | Daraj | Darakht-e Tut | Daraki | Darbelund | Darj-e Olya | Darj-e Sofla | Darmian | Darreh Abbas | Darreh Charm | Darreh Kuran | Darreh Par | Darreh Sefid | Darreh-ye Baz | Darreh-ye Ghazan-e Sofla | Darreh-ye Mirak | Darsatang | Darudi | Darvishabad | Dasteh Qich | Dastgerd | Dastgerd | Dastgerd | Dastgerd | Dastgerd | Dastjerd | Davat | Deh Mir | Deh Morgh | Deh Now | Deh Now | Deh Sheykh | Deh Shib | Dehak | Deh-e Mir | Deh-e Now | Deh-e Salam | Deh-e Sefid | Deheshk | Dehik | Dehu | Delabad | Deyhuk | Deym | Dezg-e Bala | Dezg-e Pain | Do Chahi | Do Hesaran | Do Kuhaneh | Dohlkuh | Doreh | Dowlatabad | Dubeshk | Dudu | Dugh-e Sar Bisheh | Duskam | Dustabad | Dustabad-e Bala | Duzangan

=== E ===
Ebrahimabad | Ebrahimabad | Ebrahimabad | Ebrahimabad | Ebrahimabad | Ebrahimi | Elqar | Eresk | Esfad-e Jadid | Esfahrud | Esfeden | Esfeshad | Esfezar | Esfian | Eshqabad | Eshqabad | Eshqabad | Eshqabad | Eskandar | Eskivang | Eskug | Eslamabad | Eslamiyeh | Esmailabad | Esmailabad | Esmailabad | Espid | Estakhr | Estakhrak | Estand | Estanest | Estunand | Eylaki-ye Bala | Eylaki-ye Pain

=== F ===
Fakhr ol Din | Fakhrabad | Fakhrabad | Fakhrabad | Fal | Falak | Fandokht-e Jadid | Fanud | Farakhi | Faratan | Fathabad | Fathabad | Fathabad | Fazlabad | Fedeshk | Felarg | Ferdows | Fereyduni | Feriz Morgh | Feriz Nuk | Feriz | Feriz | Fesun | Feyzabad | Feyzabad | Feyzabad | Firuzabad | Firuzabad | Fizik | Fudaj | Fur Jan | Furg | Furkhas

=== G ===
Gajikeh | Gajink | Galeh Chah | Galgun-e Bala | Galu Bagh | Gandeshkan | Ganjabad | Garm Daru | Garmab | Garm-e Tamam Deh | Garmidar | Garow | Garuk | Gas Taj | Gask | Gaveh | Gaveh | Gavij | Gavi-ye Sofla | Gaz | Gaz | Gazan | Gazar | Gazdez | Gazidari-ye Olya | Gazidari-ye Sofla | Gazik | Gazik | Gazneshk | Gaznuk | Gazond | Gazumun | Gazund | Geminj | Gerdtigh | Gerganj | Gerimenj | Ghaniabad | Gheyuk | Ghias ol Din | Gidesk | Gingeh | Gisheh | Git | Giv | Givak-e Olya | Givak-e Sofla | Givshad | Gol Afshan Shahr | Gol | Golab-e Bala | Golab-e Pain | Golandar | Golanjak | Golbargan | Gol-e Darakht | Goleh-ye Chah | Goleh-ye Cheshmeh | Golestan | Golian | Golnam-e Olya | Golunabad | Golunak | Golund-e Olya | Gombaj | Gomenj | Gondakan | Gorazan | Gowlag | Gownd | Gozokht | Gugchin | Gurab | Gurab-e Jadid | Gurid-e Bala | Gurid-e Sar Bisheh | Gush | Gusheh-ye Olya | Gusheh-ye Sofla | Gushin | Gushmir

=== H ===
Haderbad-e Olya | Hajj Naj | Hajjiabad | Hajjiabad | Hajjiabad | Hajjiabad | Hajjiabad | Hajjiabad | Hajjiabad | Hajjiabad-e Nughab | Halvai | Hamand | Hamand | Hambal | Hamech | Hami | Hamun | Harding | Harishi | Harivand | Hasan Ali | Hasan Kolangi | Hasanabad | Hasanabad | Hasanabad | Hasanabad | Hasanabad-e Korq-e Sang | Hasanabad-e Mian | Hasanabad-e Olya | Hasanabad-e Pain | Hasanabad-e Sar Kal | Hashtugan | Hatamabad | Havang-e Pain | Havigan | Hemmatabad | Hemmatabad | Hendevalan | Hengaran | Hesar Dar | Hesar | Hesar-e Sangi | Heydarabad | Hirad | Hojjatabad | Hojjatabad | Hojjatabad | Hojjatabad | Holudar-e Pain | Homayun | Honaviyeh | Hoseyn Hyati | Hoseyn Rostam | Hoseynabad | Hoseynabad | Hoseynabad | Hoseynabad | Hoseynabad | Hoseynabad | Hoseynabad | Hoseynabad | Hoseynabad-e Abaleh | Hoseynabad-e Alam | Hoseynabad-e Arabkhaneh | Hoseynabad-e Gavahi | Hoseynabad-e Ghinab | Hoseynabad-e Miran | Hoseynabad-e Pain | Hoseynabad-e Qasem | Hoseynabad-e Sar Kal | Hoseynabad-e Sarzeh | Hoseynabad-e Sheybani | Hoseynabad-e Zeydar | Howgend | Howz-e Galurshur | Howz-e Hafez | Howz-e Hasan Ali

=== I ===
Istu Chah | Ivask

=== J ===
Jabbar | Jafarabad | Jafarabad | Jafarabad | Jahanabad | Jajang | Jalal-e Sofla | Jalaran | Jamal ol Din | Jamali | Jamshidabad | Jan Ahmad | Jan Mahmud | Jan Mirza | Jang-e Chah | Jannatabad | Jannatabad | Jannatabad | Jarestan | Jijk | Jik-e Sofla | Jimabad | Jimabad | Jinan | Jirg | Joft Rud | Jolgeh Sedeh | Jowmian | Jowzurdan-e Olya | Jozandar

=== K ===
Kabad | Kabudan | Kabudeh | Kachak Ali | Kafaz | Kafki | Kaftar Milan | Kahi | Kahnan | Kahnow | Kajaru | Kajeh | Kaju-ye Pain | Kakhk | Kakhkuk | Kal Chahi | Kalaj Darg | Kalak | Kalat-e Jangal | Kalateh Hajji Ata | Kalateh-ye Ali Avaz | Kalateh-ye Aliabad | Kalateh-ye Arab | Kalateh-ye Baba | Kalateh-ye Bala | Kalateh-ye Bala | Kalateh-ye Baluch | Kalateh-ye Bazdid | Kalateh-ye Bojdi | Kalateh-ye Boluch | Kalateh-ye Boshgazi | Kalateh-ye Chajiha | Kalateh-ye Dahan Do Tagi | Kalateh-ye Dallakan | Kalateh-ye Fathollahi | Kalateh-ye Gavich | Kalateh-ye Habib | Kalateh-ye Hajji Yusof | Kalateh-ye Hasan | Kalateh-ye Hoseyn | Kalateh-ye Hoseyn Mohammad Qasem | Kalateh-ye Kachi | Kalateh-ye Kazemi | Kalateh-ye Kermani | Kalateh-ye Khan | Kalateh-ye Khan | Kalateh-ye Khoda Bakhsh | Kalateh-ye Khodadad | Kalateh-ye Mahmud Ali | Kalateh-ye Malek | Kalateh-ye Malekeh | Kalateh-ye Masib | Kalateh-ye Mazar | Kalateh-ye Mazar | Kalateh-ye Mehrak | Kalateh-ye Mir | Kalateh-ye Mirza | Kalateh-ye Mirza | Kalateh-ye Mohammad Hoseyn Khan | Kalateh-ye Mohammad Soltan | Kalateh-ye Molla Khodadad | Kalateh-ye Molla | Kalateh-ye Naser | Kalateh-ye Nasir | Kalateh-ye Nazar | Kalateh-ye Now Salmanabad | Kalateh-ye Now | Kalateh-ye Now | Kalateh-ye Now | Kalateh-ye Now | Kalateh-ye Nuri | Kalateh-ye Qannadan | Kalateh-ye Qannadan | Kalateh-ye Qassab | Kalateh-ye Qayeni | Kalateh-ye Ryisi | Kalateh-ye Said | Kalateh-ye Sari | Kalateh-ye Sarvar | Kalateh-ye Seyyed Ali | Kalateh-ye Shab | Kalateh-ye Sheykh | Kalateh-ye Shir | Kalateh-ye Shir-e Pain | Kalateh-ye Soleyman | Kalateh-ye Sorkh | Kalateh-ye Tuklabad | Kalcheh | Kal-e Hadiyeh | Kal-e Hoseyna | Kal-e Nakhab | Kal-e Sorkh | Kaleh-ye Sefid | Kali | Kamar Sabz | Kamchah | Kanarang | Kangan | Kanif | Kanik | Kapugaz | Kareshk | Kargahi | Karghond | Karijgan | Karimabad | Karimabad | Karimabad | Karimu | Karizan-e Sofla | Kariz-e Now | Karsunak | Kasakstan | Kaseh Sangi | Kasgan | Kashuk-e Olya | Kashuk-e Sofla | Kasrab | Kazkan | Kerch | Kerend | Khakak | Khalaf | Khaleqabad | Khalilan | Khanekuk | Khanik | Khanik | Khanik | Khankuk | Khar Miri | Kharam | Kharestan | Kharmenj | Kharv | Khatibi | Khavar-e Pain | Khavaz | Khazan | Kheyrabad | Kheyrabad | Kheyrabad | Kheyrabad | Khezri Dasht Beyaz | Khoda Afarid | Khomeyniabad | Khong | Khong-e Bala | Khonj | Khonjuk | Khorashad | Khorramabad | Khorramabad | Khorramak | Khorrami | Khorvaj | Khoshk | Khoshkkan | Khosrak | Khosravi | Khosravi | Khosrowabad | Khosrowabad | Khowshabad | Khug | Khunik | Khunik | Khunik Zirak | Khunik | Khunik | Khunik | Khunikak | Khunik-e Bala | Khunik-e Baz | Khunik-e Olya | Khunik-e Pain | Khunik-e Pain | Khunik-e Pay Godar | Khunik-e Tajen | Khuniksar | Khunjuk Sukhteh | Khurzad | Khusf | Khushineh-ye Olya | Khvajegi | Khvajeh Do Chahi | Khvajeh Monji Kuh | Khvan | Khvanand | Khvansharaf | Khvor | Khvorshidan | Khvoshab | Kidosht | Komachi | Kondor | Kondor | Koreh | Koreshk | Kortabad | Kuch | Kuch Elqar | Kuh Miran | Kuhsar | Kun Rud Siahu | Kur Gaz-e Bala | Kusheh | Kushk | Kushkak | Kuyerek

=== L ===
Labak | Lajenu | Lakh-e Shak | Lanu | Lati | Liski | Lojunk-e Sofla | Lukh | Luleh

=== M ===
Mabadin-e Olya | Mabadin-e Sofla | Madan-e Hajat | Mafand Ab | Mafriz | Mah Banu | Mahakan | Mahalabad-e Sofla | Mahani | Mahiabad | Mahirud | Mahizard | Mahlujan | Mahmiran | Mahmudabad | Mahmudabad | Mahmui | Mahmui | Mahsnan | Mahuk | Mahusk | Mahvaj | Mahvid | Mahyar | Majd | Makarom-e Bala | Makhunik | Malekabad | Malekabad | Maleki | Manavand | Manavand | Manginehi | Mansurabad | Mansurabad | Marak | Margh | Marghuk | Marghzar | Markeh | Marufan | Maruk | Masen | Masha Beharan | Masha-ye Hojjatabad | Masha-ye Shahid Mashfiq | Mashuki | Mask | Masudi | Masumabad | Masumabad | Mazar | Mazar-e Seyyed Ali | Mazar-e Shah | Mazhan | Mazrabad | Mazraeh-ye Mohammad Sharif | Mehdiabad | Mehdiabad | Mehdiabad | Mehdiabad | Mehenj | Mehinj | Mehmanshahr-e Ahangaran | Mehrabad | Mehrak | Mehran Kushk | Mehtaran | Mesgaran | Meyghan | Mezg | Mian Kuh | Mian Rud | Mil Gaz | Mina Khun | Mir Khan | Mirabad | Mirabad | Mirabad | Mirabad | Mirik | Mirozg | Mish-e Now | Mobarakabad | Mohammad Khan | Mohammad Taqiargha Industrial Estate | Mohammadabad | Mohammadabad | Mohammadabad | Mohammadabad | Mohammadabad | Mohammadabad | Mohammadabad | Mohammadabad | Mohammadabad-e Alam | Mohammadabad-e Chahak | Mohammadabad-e Kharkash | Mohammadabad-e Olya | Mohammadabad-e Razzaqzadeh | Mohammadabad-e Sofla | Mohammadiyeh | Mohammadshahr | Mohammadshahr | Mohebb-e Pain | Moinabad | Mokhtaran | Molla Ebrahim | Molowghan | Monavari | Monond-e Bala | Moqdar | Moqilan | Mortavand | Mortezi Rahmani | Mosabi | Mosaveri | Mostafa Rahmani | Mowtowr-e Sadat | Mozdab | Mozdabad | Mud | Mud-e Olya | Mulid | Murachek | Murdestan | Murtigh | Murutak | Musaviyeh |

=== N ===
Naemeh | Nakh Ab | Nakhrud | Naqenj | Naram | Nargandal | Nargesk | Narreh Sang-e Bala | Naserabad | Nasr ol Din | Nasrabad | Nasrabad | Nasrabad | Naz Dasht | Neginan | Nehbandan | Neyab | Neyestan | Neyg | Neygenan | Neygu | Nezumand | Nig | Nik | Nimbeluk | Nimruz | Niyar | Nomadic center | Nomadic center of 28 tents | Nosratabad | Novik | Now Bahar | Now Deh | Now Deh | Now Deh | Now Gidar | Now Kaj | Now Qand | Nowdar | Nowdeh-e Olya | Nowferest | Nowghab-e Afzalabad | Nowghab-e Pas Kuh | Nowkand | Nowkand | Nowkhanik | Nowrashk | Nowzad | Nowzad | Nughab Chik | Nughab | Nughab | Nughab | Nughab | Nughab | Nuk | Nuk | Nureshk

=== O ===
Omri | Osghul | Owj | Owjad | Owjan | Owj-e Bala | Owlang | Ozbak

=== P ===
Pa Tang | Padamrud | Padehay | Padehkeh | Pahnai | Pahvaz | Panhani | Pardan | Pariabad | Parmich | Payehan | Pedaran-e Olya | Pedaran-e Sofla | Pespatang-e Sofla | Pesteh | Pey Rud | Peygodar-e Chah-e Huz | Peyvand-e Olya | Pichekan | Pir Zanuk | Piranj | Pishbar | Pokht | Posuj | Pureng | Pustin | Puzeh-ye Zard

=== Q ===
Qadamgah | Qaemabad | Qaemabad-e Razzaqzadeh | Qaen | Qaleh Dokhtar | Qaleh Kuh | Qaleh Now | Qaleh Qonbar | Qaleh Sorkh | Qaleh Zari | Qanat | Qasabeh | Qasemabad | Qasemi | Qatar Gaz | Qeysabad | Qeysar | Qik-e Pain | Qodratabad | Qodsian | Qohestan | Qumenjan | Qurian

=== R ===
Rabiabad | Rabian | Rach | Rahimabad-e Lanu | Rahmatabad | Rahnich | Rahnishk | Rajang | Ramangan | Raqqeh | Ravij | Ray | Razdonbal | Razeh | Razg | Razg | Razq | Razuk | Reg | Rehizg | Rejnuk | Rekat-e Olya | Rekat-e Sofla | Reykhan | Rezaviyeh | Rezg | Rezvan | Rig-e Bala | Riz Ab | Rohuzg | Rojnai | Rokhneh | Roqbaghal | Roqiyehabad | Roqq-e Annabi | Roqui-ye Pain | Rowghani | Rowshanavand | Rubayat | Rubokht | Rud Darreh | Rud-e Cheshmeh | Rud-e Robat | Rudgur | Rum | Rumeh | Rumenjan | Rumoshtik | Rushk

=== S ===
Sad Gol | Sadid | Saffal Band | Saftuk | Sahlabad | Salak | Salmabad | Salmabad | Sama | Samadabad | Samafat | Samak | Samu | Sang | Sangabad | Sangan | Sangi Dari Bubak | Sanuk | Saqdar | Saqi | Saquri | Sar Asiab | Sar Chah-e Ammari | Sar Chah-e Shur | Sar Chah-e Tazian | Sar Davan | Sar Hadd | Sar Khong | Sar Saran | Sar Tangan | Sarab | Sarab | Sarab-e Sofla | Sarand | Sarand | Sarayan | Sarband-e Gaviad | Sarbisheh | Sar-e Lerd | Sarjin | Sarmasti | Sarqan-e Sofla | Sarshabad | Sartel | Sarv Bad | Sarv | Sarzeh | Sayeh Sangan | Seh Farsakh | Seh Pud | Seh Qaleh | Sehk | Semani-ye Sofla | Senji-ye Olya | Serijan | Seyedal | Seyyed Morad | Seyyedabad | Seyyedabad | Seyyedan | Seyyedan | Shabu | Shadan | Shaftalustan | Shah Mahmud | Shah Rakht | Shah Tut | Shah Zileh | Shahid Rajai construction site | Shahik | Shahrah | Shahrak-e Bidokht | Shahrak-e Chah Payab Chah Shatt | Shahrak-e Emam Khomeyni | Shahrak-e Fakhran | Shahrak-e Hashemiyeh | Shahrak-e Kalateh-ye Sheikh Ali | Shahrak-e Shahid Dastghib | Shahrak-e Sindar | Shahrak-e Tareh Tajemi Sahlabad | Shahrestanak | Shaj | Shakhen | Shamsabad | Shamsabad | Shamsabad | Shams-e Bala | Shand | Shandan | Shand-e Maleki | Shand-e Masumeh | Sharifabad | Sharqonj | Shavakand | Shekaraneh | Shevengan | Sheybani | Sheykhabad | Sheykhan | Sheyvar | Shir Khond | Shir Maghz-e Pain | Shir Manj | Shir Morgh | Shir Shotor | Shirag | Shirazeh | Shirg-e Aqa | Shirk | Shirk-e Sorjeh | Showarow | Shumeh | Shur Ab | Shurabad | Shurak | Shurak | Shurchah | Shurestan | Shurkeh | Shusef | Shushk | Shushk | Shushud | Siah Darreh | Siah Khunik | Sib Chah | Sichan | Sigari | Sigari | Sij-e Jadid | Sikuri | Siskan | Sistanak | Sivjan | Solami | Soltanabad | Soltani Olya | Soreykhan-e Sofla | Sorkh Kuh | Sowrand | Sulabast | Sulakhan | Surag | Surg

=== T ===
Tabas | Tabas-e Masina | Tabas-e Masina | Tabaseyn-e Bala | Tabaseyn-e Pain | Tablan | Tag-e Oshtoran | Taghan | Taghandik | Taheriyeh | Taj Kuh | Taj Kuh | Taj Mir | Tajag | Tajan | Tajark | Tajerg | Tajeshk | Tajnud | Tak-e Ab Band | Takhteh-ye Jan | Takhvij | Tal Quch | Tal Zardak | Talaran-e Markazi | Tamand | Tanak-e Olya | Tanak-e Sofla | Tandil | Tangal | Tangal-e Ali Beyk | Tangal-e Bala | Tangal-e Behdan | Taqab | Taqcharabad | Taqiabad | Taqiabad | Tarakani-ye Pain | Taroq | Tashvand | Tiduk | Tigab | Tighab | Tighanab Bala | Tighdar | Tighdar-e Olya | Tiz Kuh | Tolombeh-ye Nosrat | Tolombeh-ye Zeyn al Abdeyn | Toros Ab | Torsh Ap | Torshizuk | Tuj | Tur | Turman | Tut Kari | Tut | Tutak | Tutesk | Tuti

=== V ===
Vahedabad | Valiabad | Valias Agricultural Cooperative | Varazq | Varezg | Varqaneh | Vashan | Vorenjan

=== Y ===
Yahn | Yazdan Chah | Yegi | Yush | Yushu

=== Z ===
Zabideh | Zadonbeh-ye Bala | Zadonbeh-ye Pain | Zaghu | Zahab-e Olya | Zahr | Zaliran | Zamanabad | Zamani | Zanagu | Zangui | Zanuk | Zar Sonowk | Zardan | Zargar | Zargaz | Zari Chah | Zarkesh | Zarkhvan | Zekri | Zeroft | Zeyd | Zeydan | Zeydar | Zeynabad | Zeynabad | Zeyni | Zir Barandud | Ziraj | Zirak | Zirak | Zirenj | Zohan | Zohri | Zuk | Zul | Zulesk
