= Now Gidar =

Now Gidar نوگيدر
- Village
- Location within Iran
- Coordinates: 33°07′33″N 59°24′25″E
- Country: Iran
- Province: South Khorasan
- County: Birjand
- Bakhsh: Central
- Rural District: Alqurat

Population (2006)
  - Total: 142
- Time zone: UTC+3:30 (IRST)
  - Summer (DST): UTC+4:30 (IRDT)

Now Gidar (Persian: نوگيدر, also Romanized as Now Gīdar, Naugidar, and Nūgdār and noogidar) is a village in Alqurat Rural District, in the Central District of Birjand County, South Khorasan Province, Iran. At the 2006 census, its population was 142, in 33 families.
