= Arvij =

Arvij ارویج
- Village
- Location within Iran
- Coordinates: 32°55′58″N 59°33′20″E
- Country: Iran
- Province: South Khorasan
- County: Birjand
- Bakhsh: Central
- Rural District: Kahshang

Population (2016)
  - Total: 46
- Time zone: UTC+3:30 (IRST)
  - Summer (DST): UTC+4:30 (IRDT)

Arvij (Persian: ارویج, also Romanized as Arvīj; also known as Ārbīj, Arvīch, Arbīch, Ārwīch, and Azvench) is a village in Kahshang Rural District, in the Central District of Birjand County, South Khorasan Province, Iran. At the 2016 census, its population was 46, in 18 families.
