= Rohuzg =

Rohuzg رهوزگ
- Village
- Location within Iran
- Coordinates: 32°20′05″N 59°17′43″E
- Country: Iran
- Province: South Khorasan
- County: Sarbisheh
- Bakhsh: Mud
- Rural District: Naharjan

Population (2006)
  - Total: 41
- Time zone: UTC+3:30 (IRST)
  - Summer (DST): UTC+4:30 (IRDT)

Rohuzg (Persian: رهوزگ, also Romanized as Rohūzg, Rohrozg, Rehīzeg, Rehīzek, Rohūq, and Ruhūzg) is a village in Naharjan Rural District, Mud District, Sarbisheh County, South Khorasan Province, Iran. At the 2006 census, its population was 41, with 10 families.
