= Tablan =

Tablan تبلان
- Village
- Location within Iran
- Coordinates: 33°51′33″N 58°51′08″E
- Country: Iran
- Province: South Khorasan
- County: Qaen
- Bakhsh: Nimbeluk
- Rural District: Nimbeluk

Population (2006)
  - Total: 64
- Time zone: UTC+3:30 (IRST)
  - Summer (DST): UTC+4:30 (IRDT)

Tablan (Persian: تبلان, also Romanized as Tablān; also known as Tablū, Tahbalu, and Tablow) is a village in Nimbeluk Rural District, Nimbeluk District, Qaen County, South Khorasan Province, Iran. At the 2006 census, its population was 64, in 26 families.
