= Padehkeh =

Padehkeh پده كه
- Village
- Location within Iran
- Coordinates: 31°33′17″N 59°18′57″E
- Country: Iran
- Province: South Khorasan
- County: Nehbandan
- Bakhsh: Central
- Rural District: Meyghan

Population (2006)
  - Total: 30
- Time zone: UTC+3:30 (IRST)
  - Summer (DST): UTC+4:30 (IRDT)

Padehkeh (Persian: پده كه; also known as Padkeh) is a village in Meyghan Rural District, in the Central District of Nehbandan County, South Khorasan Province, Iran. At the 2006 census, its population was 30, in 6 families.
