= Qodsian =

Qodsian قدسيان
- Village
- Location within Iran
- Coordinates: 32°27′11″N 59°37′42″E
- Country: Iran
- Province: South Khorasan
- County: Sarbisheh
- Bakhsh: Mud
- Rural District: Naharjan

Population (2006)
  - Total: 32
- Time zone: UTC+3:30 (IRST)
  - Summer (DST): UTC+4:30 (IRDT)

Qodsian (Persian: قدسيان, also Romanized as Qodsīān) is a village in Naharjan Rural District, Mud District, Sarbisheh County, South Khorasan Province, Iran. At the 2006 census, its population was 32, in 12 families.
