= Ali Zangi =

Ali Zangi علي زنگي
- Village
- Location within Iran
- Coordinates: 33°57′34″N 58°44′30″E
- Country: Iran
- Province: South Khorasan
- County: Qaen
- Bakhsh: Nimbeluk
- Rural District: Nimbeluk

Population (2006)
  - Total: 101
- Time zone: UTC+3:30 (IRST)
  - Summer (DST): UTC+4:30 (IRDT)

Ali Zangi (Persian: علي زنگي, also Romanized as ‘Alī Zangī; also known as ‘Alī Rangī) is a village in Nimbeluk Rural District, Nimbeluk District, Qaen County, South Khorasan Province, Iran. At the 2006 census, its population was 101, in 29 families.
