= Pey Rud =

Pey Rud پيرود
- Village
- Location within Iran
- Coordinates: 32°34′35″N 58°59′02″E
- Country: Iran
- Province: South Khorasan
- County: Khusf
- Bakhsh: Jolgeh-e Mazhan
- Rural District: Jolgeh-e Mazhan

Population (2006)
  - Total: 105
- Time zone: UTC+3:30 (IRST)
  - Summer (DST): UTC+4:30 (IRDT)

Pey Rud (Persian: پيرود, also Romanized as Pey Rūd, Pai-Rūd, Pa yi Rūd, and Pay-ye Rūd; also known as Zenūr) is a village in Jolgeh-e Mazhan Rural District, Jolgeh-e Mazhan District, Khusf County, South Khorasan Province, Iran. At the 2006 census, its population was 105, in 33 families.
