= Fudaj =

Fudaj فوداج
- Village
- Location within Iran
- Coordinates: 32°49′08″N 59°16′38″E
- Country: Iran
- Province: South Khorasan
- County: Birjand
- Bakhsh: Central
- Rural District: Baqeran

Population (2006)
  - Total: 52
- Time zone: UTC+3:30 (IRST)
  - Summer (DST): UTC+4:30 (IRDT)

Fudaj (Persian: فوداج, also Romanized as Fūdāj and Foodaj; also known as Pūdāj and Fūdāch) is a village in Baqeran Rural District, in the Central District of Birjand County, South Khorasan Province, Iran. At the 2006 census, its population was 52, in 16 families.
