= Kalateh-ye Kermani =

Kalateh-ye Kermani كلاته كرماني
- Village
- Location within Iran
- Coordinates: 32°37′20″N 59°38′03″E
- Country: Iran
- Province: South Khorasan
- County: Sarbisheh
- Bakhsh: Central
- Rural District: Momenabad

Population (2006)
  - Total: 88
- Time zone: UTC+3:30 (IRST)
  - Summer (DST): UTC+4:30 (IRDT)

Kalateh-ye Kermani (Persian: كلاته كرماني, also Romanized as Kalāteh-ye Kermānī; also known as Espahnū) is a village in Momenabad Rural District, in the Central District of Sarbisheh County, South Khorasan Province, Iran. At the 2006 census, its population was 88, in 22 families.
