= Murachek =

Murachek مورچك
- Village
- Location within Iran
- Coordinates: 32°42′11″N 59°20′20″E
- Country: Iran
- Province: South Khorasan
- County: Birjand
- Bakhsh: Central
- Rural District: Baqeran

Population (2006)
  - Total: 18
- Time zone: UTC+3:30 (IRST)
  - Summer (DST): UTC+4:30 (IRDT)

Murachek (Persian: مورچك, also Romanized as Marūchek and Marūchak; also known as Marūch and Marooch Janbe’ Mahmood Abad) is a village in Baqeran Rural District, in the Central District of Birjand County, South Khorasan Province, Iran. At the 2006 census, its population was 18 persons in 8 families.
