= Baburik-e Sofla =

Baburik-e Sofla بابريك سفلي
- Village
- Location within Iran
- Coordinates: 33°10′13″N 59°45′55″E
- Country: Iran
- Province: South Khorasan
- County: Darmian
- Bakhsh: Qohestan
- Rural District: Qohestan

Population (2006)
  - Total: 72
- Time zone: UTC+3:30 (IRST)
  - Summer (DST): UTC+4:30 (IRDT)

Baburik-e Sofla (Persian: بابريك سفلي, also Romanized as Bābūrīk-e Soflá; also known as Bābūrīk-e Pā’īn, Babrīk-e Pā’īn, and Kalāteh-ye Yā‘qūb) is a village in Qohestan Rural District, Qohestan District, Darmian County, South Khorasan Province, Iran. At the 2006 census, its population was 72, in 19 families.
