= Rud-e Cheshmeh =

Rud-e Cheshmeh رودچشمه
- Village
- Country: Iran
- Province: South Khorasan
- County: Nehbandan
- Bakhsh: Central
- Rural District: Meyghan

Population (2006)
  - Total: 63
- Time zone: UTC+3:30 (IRST)
  - Summer (DST): UTC+4:30 (IRDT)

Rud-e Cheshmeh (Persian: رودچشمه, also Romanized as Rūd-e Cheshmeh) is a village in Meyghan Rural District, in the Central District of Nehbandan County, South Khorasan Province, Iran. At the 2006 census, its population was 63, in 12 families.
