= Kashuk-e Olya =

Kashuk-e Olya كشوك عليا
- Village
- Location within Iran
- Coordinates: 32°24′44″N 59°10′11″E
- Country: Iran
- Province: South Khorasan
- County: Khusf
- Bakhsh: Jolgeh-e Mazhan
- Rural District: Jolgeh-e Mazhan

Population (2006)
  - Total: 29
- Time zone: UTC+3:30 (IRST)
  - Summer (DST): UTC+4:30 (IRDT)

Kashuk-e Olya (Persian: كشوك عليا, also Romanized as Kashūk-e ‘Olyā, Kashūk ‘Olyā, and Kashook Olya; also known as Keshūk-e Bālā, Kashūk Bālā, Kashūk-e Bālā, Keshūk Bālā, and Kishuk) is a village in Jolgeh-e Mazhan Rural District, Jolgeh-e Mazhan District, Khusf County, South Khorasan Province, Iran. At the 2006 census, its population was 29, in 10 families.
