= Siah Khunik =

Siah Khunik سياه خونيك
- Village
- Location within Iran
- Coordinates: 31°47′37″N 59°50′50″E
- Country: Iran
- Province: South Khorasan
- County: Nehbandan
- Bakhsh: Central
- Rural District: Neh

Population (2006)
  - Total: 252
- Time zone: UTC+3:30 (IRST)
  - Summer (DST): UTC+4:30 (IRDT)

Siah Khunik (Persian: سياه خونيك, also Romanized as Sīāh Khūnīk and Seyāh Khūnīk) is a village in Neh Rural District, in the Central District of Nehbandan County, South Khorasan Province, Iran. At the 2006 census, its population was 252, in 57 families.
