= Jalaran =

Jalaran جلاران
- Village
- Location within Iran
- Coordinates: 32°33′36″N 60°18′36″E
- Country: Iran
- Province: South Khorasan
- County: Darmian
- Bakhsh: Gazik
- Rural District: Tabas-e Masina

Population (2006)
  - Total: 62
- Time zone: UTC+3:30 (IRST)
  - Summer (DST): UTC+4:30 (IRDT)

Jalaran (Persian: جلاران, also Romanized as Jalārān) is a village in Tabas-e Masina Rural District, Gazik District, Darmian County, South Khorasan Province, Iran. At the 2006 census, its population was 62, in 20 families.
