= Bashiran =

Bashiran بشيران
- Village
- Location within Iran
- Coordinates: 33°33′06″N 59°57′02″E
- Country: Iran
- Province: South Khorasan
- County: Zirkuh
- Bakhsh: Central District
- Rural District: Zirkuh

Population (2006)
  - Total: 88
- Time zone: UTC+3:30 (IRST)
  - Summer (DST): UTC+4:30 (IRDT)

Bashiran (Persian: بشيران, also Romanized as Bashīrān) is a village in Zirkuh Rural District, Central District, Zirkuh County, South Khorasan Province, Iran. At the 2006 census, its population was 88, in 24 families.
