= Pokht =

Pokht پخت
- Village
- Location within Iran
- Coordinates: 32°34′54″N 59°37′20″E
- Country: Iran
- Province: South Khorasan
- County: Sarbisheh
- Bakhsh: Central
- Rural District: Momenabad

Population (2006)
  - Total: 173
- Time zone: UTC+3:30 (IRST)
  - Summer (DST): UTC+4:30 (IRDT)

Pokht (Persian: پخت, also Romanized as Pookht and Pukht) is a village in Momenabad Rural District, in the Central District of Sarbisheh County, South Khorasan Province, Iran. At the 2006 census, its population was 173, in 63 families.
