= Sowrand =

Sowrand سورند
- Village
- Location within Iran
- Coordinates: 33°19′37″N 60°04′06″E
- Country: Iran
- Province: South Khorasan
- County: Zirkuh
- Bakhsh: Central
- Rural District: Zirkuh

Population (2006)
  - Total: 144
- Time zone: UTC+3:30 (IRST)
  - Summer (DST): UTC+4:30 (IRDT)

Sowrand (Persian: سورند, also Romanized as Sūrand) is a village in Zirkuh Rural District, Central District, Zirkuh County, South Khorasan Province, Iran. At the 2006 census, its population was 144, in 37 families.
