= Rabian =

Rabian ربيان
- Village
- Location within Iran
- Coordinates: 32°58′29.9″N 59°26′32.3″E
- Country: Iran
- Province: South Khorasan
- County: Birjand
- Bakhsh: Central
- Rural District: Kahshang

Population (2016)
  - Total: 44
- Time zone: UTC+3:30 (IRST)
  - Summer (DST): UTC+4:30 (IRDT)

Rabian (Persian: ربیان, also Romanized as Rabīān, Rabeyān, and Rabī‘ān) is a village in Kahshang Rural District, in the Central District of Birjand County, South Khorasan Province, Iran. At the 2006 census, its population was 44, in 17 families.
