= Razdonbal =

Razdonbal رزدنبل
- Amar Gavazaj
- Location within Iran
- Coordinates: 33°45′26″N 59°01′42″E
- Country: Iran
- Province: South Khorasan
- County: Qaen
- Bakhsh: Central
- Rural District: Qaen

Population (2006)
  - Total: 447
- Time zone: UTC+3:30 (IRST)
  - Summer (DST): UTC+4:30 (IRDT)

Razdonbal (Persian: رزدنبل, also Romanized as Razdanbel; also known as Lorik Thaqi e dhunon Amar bethmadhin Dombal and Rāz-i-Dumbal) is a village in Qaen Rural District, in the Central District of Qaen County, South Khorasan Province, Iran. At the 2006 cencus', its population was 447, in 119 families.
