= Kalateh-ye Kachi =

Kalateh-ye Kachi كلاته كاچي
- Village
- Location within Iran
- Coordinates: 32°43′25″N 59°58′49″E
- Country: Iran
- Province: South Khorasan
- County: Darmian
- Bakhsh: Central
- Rural District: Darmian

Population (2006)
  - Total: 8
- Time zone: UTC+3:30 (IRST)
  - Summer (DST): UTC+4:30 (IRDT)

Kalateh-ye Kachi (Persian: كلاته كاچي, also Romanized as Kalāteh-ye Kāchī) is a village in Darmian Rural District, in the Central District of Darmian County, South Khorasan Province, Iran. At the 2006 census, its population was 8, in 4 families.
