= Seh Farsakh =

Seh Farsakh سه فرسخ
- Village
- Location within Iran
- Coordinates: 31°22′39″N 60°03′38″E
- Country: Iran
- Province: South Khorasan
- County: Nehbandan
- Bakhsh: Central
- Rural District: Neh

Population (2006)
  - Total: 49
- Time zone: UTC+3:30 (IRST)
  - Summer (DST): UTC+4:30 (IRDT)

Seh Farsakh (Persian: سه فرسخ; also known as Sefarsakh and Seh Farsang) is a village in Neh Rural District, in the Central District of Nehbandan County, South Khorasan Province, Iran. At the 2006 census, its population was 49, in 15 families.
