= Basnabad =

Basnabad باسناباد
- Village
- Location within Iran
- Coordinates: 32°40′09″N 59°32′17″E
- Country: Iran
- Province: South Khorasan
- County: Sarbisheh
- Bakhsh: Mud
- Rural District: Mud

Population (2006)
  - Total: 39
- Time zone: UTC+3:30 (IRST)
  - Summer (DST): UTC+4:30 (IRDT)

Basnabad (Persian: باسناباد, also Romanized as Bāsnābād; also known as Bosnābād and Būznābād) is a village in Mud Rural District, Mud District, Sarbisheh County, South Khorasan Province, Iran. According to the 2006 census, it had a population of 39 in 12 families.
