= Zar Sonowk =

Zar Sonowk زرسنوك
- Village
- Location within Iran
- Coordinates: 32°31′07″N 59°40′28″E
- Country: Iran
- Province: South Khorasan
- County: Sarbisheh
- Bakhsh: Central
- Rural District: Momenabad

Population (2006)
  - Total: 32
- Time zone: UTC+3:30 (IRST)
  - Summer (DST): UTC+4:30 (IRDT)

Zar Sonowk (Persian: زرسنوك, also Romanized as Zar Sanūk, Zarsenūk, Zar Sūnūk, and Zaz Sanook) is a village in Momenabad Rural District, in the Central District of Sarbisheh County, South Khorasan Province, Iran. At the 2006 census, its population was 32, in 11 families.
