= Bidesk =

Bidesk بيدسك
- Village
- Location within Iran
- Coordinates: 33°06′15″N 59°26′22″E
- Country: Iran
- Province: South Khorasan
- County: Birjand
- Bakhsh: Central
- Rural District: Alqurat

Population (2006)
  - Total: 238
- Time zone: UTC+3:30 (IRST)
  - Summer (DST): UTC+4:30 (IRDT)

Bidesk (Persian: بيدسك, also Romanized as Bīdesk and Bīdisk; also known as Bīd’īk) is a village in Alqurat Rural District, in the Central District of Birjand County, South Khorasan Province, Iran. At the 2006 census, its population was 238, in 53 families.
