= Jozandar =

Jozandar جوزاندر
- Village
- Location within Iran
- Coordinates: 34°00′59″N 59°14′37″E
- Country: Iran
- Province: South Khorasan
- County: Qaen
- Bakhsh: Central
- Rural District: Mahyar

Population (2006)
  - Total: 17
- Time zone: UTC+3:30 (IRST)
  - Summer (DST): UTC+4:30 (IRDT)

Jozandar (Persian: جوزاندر, also Romanized as Jowz Andar) is a village in Mahyar Rural District, in the Central District of Qaen County, South Khorasan Province, Iran. At the 2006 census, its population was 17, in 6 families.
