= Kalateh-ye Mohammad Hoseyn Khan =

Village in South Khorasan, Iran

Kalateh-ye Mohammad Hoseyn Khan كلاته محمدحسين خان
- Village
- Location within Iran
- Coordinates: 32°47′02″N 59°22′47″E
- Country: Iran
- Province: South Khorasan
- County: Birjand
- Bakhsh: Central
- Rural District: Baqeran

Population (2006)
  - Total: 18
- Time zone: UTC+3:30 (IRST)
  - Summer (DST): UTC+4:30 (IRDT)

Kalateh-ye Mohammad Hoseyn Khan (Persian: كلاته محمدحسين خان, also Romanized as Kalāteh-ye Moḩammad Ḩoseyn Khān, Kalateh Mohammad Hosein Khan, and Kalāteh Muhammad Husain Khān; also known as Kalāt-e Moḩammad Ḩoseyn Khān and Ordūgāh Shahīd Moṣṭafa) is a village in Baqeran Rural District, in the Central District of Birjand County, South Khorasan Province, Iran. At the 2006 census, its population was 18, in 6 families.
