= Hoseyn Rostam =

Hoseyn Rostam حسين رستم
- Village
- Location within Iran
- Coordinates: 31°52′56″N 59°41′47″E
- Country: Iran
- Province: South Khorasan
- County: Nehbandan
- Bakhsh: Central
- Rural District: Meyghan

Population (2006)
  - Total: 34
- Time zone: UTC+3:30 (IRST)
  - Summer (DST): UTC+4:30 (IRDT)

Hoseyn Rostam (Persian: حسين رستم, also Romanized as Ḩoseyn Rostam; also known as Kalāteh-ye Ḩoseyn Rostam) is a village in Meyghan Rural District, in the Central District of Nehbandan County, South Khorasan Province, Iran. At the 2006 census, its population was 34, consisting of 9 families.
