= Eskug =

Eskug اسكوگ
- Village
- Location within Iran
- Coordinates: 32°37′41″N 59°22′24″E
- Country: Iran
- Province: South Khorasan
- County: Sarbisheh
- Bakhsh: Mud
- Rural District: Naharjan

Population (2006)
  - Total: 13
- Time zone: UTC+3:30 (IRST)
  - Summer (DST): UTC+4:30 (IRDT)

Eskug (Persian: اسكوگ, also Romanized as Eskūg, Eskūk, Askook, and Iskaug) is a village in Naharjan Rural District, Mud District, Sarbisheh County, South Khorasan Province, Iran. According to the 2006 census, it had a population of 13 in 5 families.
