= Saquri =

Saquri ثقوري
- Village
- Location within Iran
- Coordinates: 34°03′44″N 58°42′54″E
- Country: Iran
- Province: South Khorasan
- County: Qaen
- Bakhsh: Nimbeluk
- Rural District: Nimbeluk

Population (2006)
  - Total: 83
- Time zone: UTC+3:30 (IRST)
  - Summer (DST): UTC+4:30 (IRDT)

Saquri (Persian: ثقوري, also Romanized as S̄aqūrī and S̄aghūrī) is a village in Nimbeluk Rural District, Nimbeluk District, Qaen County, South Khorasan Province, Iran. At the 2006 census, its population was 83, in 23 families.
