= Mostafa Rahmani =

Mostafa Rahmani مصطفي رحماني
- Village
- Location within Iran
- Coordinates: 33°23′33″N 59°17′20″E
- Country: Iran
- Province: South Khorasan
- County: Qaen
- Bakhsh: Sedeh
- Rural District: Sedeh

Population (2006)
  - Total: 36
- Time zone: UTC+3:30 (IRST)
  - Summer (DST): UTC+4:30 (IRDT)

Mostafa Rahmani (Persian: مصطفي رحماني, also Romanized as Moşţafá Raḩmānī; also known as Kalāteh-ye Moşţafá and Kalāteh Moşţafá) is a village in Sedeh Rural District, Sedeh District, Qaen County, South Khorasan Province, Iran. At the 2006 census, its population was 36, in 12 families.
