= Kal-e Hadiyeh =

Kal-e Hadiyeh كال هديه
- Village
- Country: Iran
- Province: South Khorasan
- County: Nehbandan
- Bakhsh: Shusef
- Rural District: Shusef

Population (2006)
  - Total: 34
- Time zone: UTC+3:30 (IRST)
  - Summer (DST): UTC+4:30 (IRDT)

Kal-e Hadiyeh (Persian: كال هديه, also Romanized as Kāl-e Hadīyeh) is a village in Shusef Rural District, Shusef District, Nehbandan County, South Khorasan Province, Iran. At the 2006 census, its population was 34 consisting of 5 families.
