= Gajink =

Gajink گجينك
- Village
- Country: Iran
- Province: South Khorasan
- County: Nehbandan
- Bakhsh: Central
- Rural District: Meyghan

Population (2006)
  - Total: 57
- Time zone: UTC+3:30 (IRST)
  - Summer (DST): UTC+4:30 (IRDT)

Gajink (Persian: گجينك, also Romanized as Gajīnḵ) is a village in Meyghan Rural District, in the Central District of Nehbandan County, South Khorasan Province, Iran. According to the 2006 census, its population was 57, in 13 families.
