= Tangal-e Bala =

Tangal-e Bala تنگل بالا
- Village
- Location within Iran
- Coordinates: 32°58′42″N 59°13′47″E
- Country: Iran
- Province: South Khorasan
- County: Birjand
- Bakhsh: Central
- Rural District: Alqurat

Population (2006)
  - Total: 24
- Time zone: UTC+3:30 (IRST)
  - Summer (DST): UTC+4:30 (IRDT)

Tangal-e Bala (Persian: تنگل بالا, also Romanized as Tangal-e Bālā) is a village in Alqurat Rural District, in the Central District of Birjand County, South Khorasan Province, Iran. At the 2006 census, its population was 24, in 10 families.
