= Barzaj =

Barzaj برزج
- Village
- Location within Iran
- Coordinates: 32°42′38″N 59°23′57″E
- Country: Iran
- Province: South Khorasan
- County: Birjand
- Bakhsh: Central
- Rural District: Baqeran

Population (2006)
  - Total: 85
- Time zone: UTC+3:30 (IRST)
  - Summer (DST): UTC+4:30 (IRDT)

Barzaj (Persian: برزج, also Romanized as Barzāj, Barzech, Barzach, and Barzich) is a village in Baqeran Rural District, in the Central District of Birjand County, South Khorasan Province, Iran. At the 2006 census, its population was 85, in 26 families.
