= Gheyuk =

Gheyuk غيوك
- Village
- Location within Iran
- Coordinates: 33°05′54″N 59°17′14″E
- Country: Iran
- Province: South Khorasan
- County: Birjand
- Bakhsh: Central
- Rural District: Alqurat

Population (2006)
  - Total: 171
- Time zone: UTC+3:30 (IRST)
  - Summer (DST): UTC+4:30 (IRDT)

Gheyuk (Persian: غيوك, also Romanized as Gheyūk and Gheyūg; also known as Gheyb and Ghībk) is a village in Alqurat Rural District, in the Central District of Birjand County, South Khorasan Province, Iran. According to the 2006 census, it consisted of 65 families and had a population of 171 people.
