= Parmich =

Parmich پرمچ
- Village
- Location within Iran
- Coordinates: 32°41′14″N 59°17′58″E
- Country: Iran
- Province: South Khorasan
- County: Khusf
- Bakhsh: Jolgeh-e Mazhan
- Rural District: Barakuh

Population (2006)
  - Total: 17
- Time zone: UTC+3:30 (IRST)
  - Summer (DST): UTC+4:30 (IRDT)

Parmich (Persian: پرمچ, also Romanized as Parmīch; also known as Parmenj and Pīr Mench) is a village in Barakuh Rural District, Jolgeh-e Mazhan District, Khusf County, South Khorasan Province, Iran. At the 2006 census, its population was 17, in 7 families.
