= Rudgur =

Rudgur رودگور
- Village
- Location within Iran
- Coordinates: 31°39′46″N 59°19′38″E
- Country: Iran
- Province: South Khorasan
- County: Nehbandan
- Bakhsh: Central
- Rural District: Meyghan

Population (2006)
  - Total: 66
- Time zone: UTC+3:30 (IRST)
  - Summer (DST): UTC+4:30 (IRDT)

Rudgur (Persian: رودگور, also Romanized as Rūdgūr and Rood Goor; also known as Kalāt-e Rūd-e Kūr, Kalāteh-ye Rūd-e Ger, Kalāteh-ye Rūd, Kalāteh-ye Rūd-e Gūr, and Kalāt-e Rūd-e Gūr) is a village in Meyghan Rural District, in the Central District of Nehbandan County, South Khorasan Province, Iran. At the 2006 census, its population was 66, in 16 families.
