= Chah Howz =

Chah Howz چاه حوض
- Village
- Location within Iran
- Coordinates: 32°59′00″N 59°09′40″E
- Country: Iran
- Province: South Khorasan
- County: Birjand
- Bakhsh: Central
- Rural District: Baqeran

Population (2006)
  - Total: 81
- Time zone: UTC+3:30 (IRST)
  - Summer (DST): UTC+4:30 (IRDT)

Chah Howz (Persian: چاه حوض, also Romanized as Chāh Ḩowẕ, Chā Ḩowẕ, and Chāh Hauz) is a village in Baqeran Rural District, in the Central District of Birjand County, South Khorasan Province, Iran. At the 2006 census, its population was 81, in 34 families.
