= Mulid =

Mulid موليد
- village
- Location within Iran
- Coordinates: 33°11′20″N 59°21′56″E
- Country: Iran
- Province: South Khorasan
- County: Birjand
- Bakhsh: Central
- Rural District: Alqurat

Population (2006)
  - Total: 135
- Time zone: UTC+3:30 (IRST)
  - Summer (DST): UTC+4:30 (IRDT)

Mulid (Persian: موليد, also Romanized as Mūlīd and Mowlīd) is a village in Alqurat Rural District, in the Central District of Birjand County, South Khorasan Province, Iran. At the 2006 census, its population was 135, in 48 families.
