= Golunabad =

Golunabad گلون اباد
- Village
- Location within Iran
- Coordinates: 33°09′53″N 59°22′26″E
- Country: Iran
- Province: South Khorasan
- County: Birjand
- Bakhsh: Central
- Rural District: Alqurat

Population (2006)
  - Total: 198
- Time zone: UTC+3:30 (IRST)
  - Summer (DST): UTC+4:30 (IRDT)

Golunabad (Persian: گلون اباد, also Romanized as Golūnābād, Gulunābād, and Kūlūnābād) is a village in Alqurat Rural District, in the Central District of Birjand County, South Khorasan Province, Iran. At the 2006 census, its population was 198, in 64 families.
