= Nimruz, Iran =

Nimruz نيم روز
- Village
- Location within Iran
- Coordinates: 33°57′28″N 59°16′05″E
- Country: Iran
- Province: South Khorasan
- County: Qaen
- Bakhsh: Central
- Rural District: Mahyar

Population (2006)
  - Total: 44
- Time zone: UTC+3:30 (IRST)
  - Summer (DST): UTC+4:30 (IRDT)

Nimruz (Persian: نيم روز, romanized: Nīmrūz) is a village in Mahyar Rural District, in the Central District of Qaen County, South Khorasan Province, Iran. At the 2006 census, its population was 44, in 12 families.
