= Harivand =

Harivand هريوند
- Village
- Location within Iran
- Coordinates: 32°37′23″N 59°28′59″E
- Country: Iran
- Province: South Khorasan
- County: Sarbisheh
- Bakhsh: Mud
- Rural District: Mud

Population (2006)
  - Total: 158
- Time zone: UTC+3:30 (IRST)
  - Summer (DST): UTC+4:30 (IRDT)

Harivand (Persian: هريوند, also Romanized as Harīvand and Harīwand; also known as Harīvaneh) is a village in Mud Rural District, Mud District, Sarbisheh County, South Khorasan Province, Iran. At the 2006 census, its population was 158, in 59 families.
