= Khushineh-ye Olya =

Khushineh-ye Olya خوشینه علیا
- Village
- Location within Iran
- Coordinates: 32°56′44″N 59°31′06″E
- Country: Iran
- Province: South Khorasan
- County: Birjand
- Bakhsh: Central
- Rural District: Kahshang

Population (2016)
  - Total: 73
- Time zone: UTC+3:30 (IRST)
  - Summer (DST): UTC+4:30 (IRDT)

Khushineh-ye Olya (Persian: خوشينه عليا, also Romanized as Khūshīneh-ye ‘Olyā and Khūshīneh ‘Olyā; also known as Khūshīneh-ye Bālā, Khosinad Olya, and Khūshīneh Bālā) is a village in Kahshang Rural District, in the Central District of Birjand County, South Khorasan Province, Iran. At the 2016 census, its population was 73, in 26 families.
