= Molla Ebrahim =

Molla Ebrahim ملاابراهيم
- Village
- Location within Iran
- Coordinates: 32°27′59″N 59°35′32″E
- Country: Iran
- Province: South Khorasan
- County: Sarbisheh
- Bakhsh: Mud
- Rural District: Naharjan

Population (2006)
  - Total: 12
- Time zone: UTC+3:30 (IRST)
  - Summer (DST): UTC+4:30 (IRDT)

Molla Ebrahim (Persian: ملاابراهيم, also Romanized as Mollā Ebrāhīm and Mulla Ibrāhīm) is a village in Naharjan Rural District, Mud District, Sarbisheh County, South Khorasan Province, Iran. At the 2006 census, its population was 12, in 4 families.
