= Tak-e Ab Band =

Tak-e Ab Band تكاب بند
- Village
- Location within Iran
- Coordinates: 33°39′50″N 58°58′29″E
- Country: Iran
- Province: South Khorasan
- County: Qaen
- Bakhsh: Central
- Rural District: Qaen

Population (2006)
  - Total: 167
- Time zone: UTC+3:30 (IRST)
  - Summer (DST): UTC+4:30 (IRDT)

Tak-e Ab Band (Persian: تكاب بند, also Romanized as Tak-e Āb Band and Tag-e Āb Band; also known as Takā Band) is a village in Qaen Rural District, in the Central District of Qaen County, South Khorasan Province, Iran. At the 2006 census, its population was 167, in 51 families.
