= Jijk =

Jijk جیجگ
- Village
- Location within Iran
- Coordinates: 33°05′56″N 59°29′02″E
- Country: Iran
- Province: South Khorasan
- County: Birjand
- Bakhsh: Central
- Rural District: Kahshang

Population (2016)
  - Total: 36
- Time zone: UTC+3:30 (IRST)
  - Summer (DST): UTC+4:30 (IRDT)

Jijk (Persian: جيجك, also Romanized as Jījk; also known as Jījag, Jajk, Jejg, and Jījong) is a village in Kahshang Rural District, in the Central District of Birjand County, South Khorasan Province, Iran. At the 2016 census, its population was 36, in 17 families.
