= Kalateh-ye Hoseyn =

Kalateh-ye Hoseyn كلاته حسين
- Village
- Location within Iran
- Coordinates: 32°44′00″N 59°28′00″E
- Country: Iran
- Province: South Khorasan
- County: Birjand
- Bakhsh: Central
- Rural District: Baqeran

Population (2006)
  - Total: 18
- Time zone: UTC+3:30 (IRST)
  - Summer (DST): UTC+4:30 (IRDT)

Kalateh-ye Hoseyn (Persian: كلاته حسين, also Romanized as Kalāteh-ye Ḩoseyn, Kalateh Hosein and Kalāteh Husain) is a village in Baqeran Rural District, in the Central District of Birjand County, South Khorasan Province, Iran. At the 2006 census, its population was 18 across 7 families.
