= Kaseh Sangi =

Kaseh Sangi كاسه سنگي
- Village
- Location within Iran
- Coordinates: 32°49′31″N 59°11′00″E
- Country: Iran
- Province: South Khorasan
- County: Birjand
- Bakhsh: Central
- Rural District: Baqeran

Population (2006)
  - Total: 146
- Time zone: UTC+3:30 (IRST)
  - Summer (DST): UTC+4:30 (IRDT)

Kaseh Sangi (Persian: كاسه سنگي, also Romanized as Kāseh Sangī; also known as Kāseh Sang) is a village in Baqeran Rural District, in the Central District of Birjand County, South Khorasan Province, Iran. At the 2006 census, its population was 146, in 47 families.
