= Khankuk =

Khankuk خنكوك
- Village
- Location within Iran
- Coordinates: 33°59′14″N 58°39′25″E
- Country: Iran
- Province: South Khorasan
- County: Qaen
- Bakhsh: Nimbeluk
- Rural District: Nimbeluk

Population (2006)
  - Total: 44
- Time zone: UTC+3:30 (IRST)
  - Summer (DST): UTC+4:30 (IRDT)

Khankuk (Persian: خنكوك, also Romanized as Khanḵūḵ; also known as Khūnīkūk) is a village in Nimbeluk Rural District, Nimbeluk District, Qaen County, South Khorasan Province, Iran. At the 2006 census, its population was 44, in 13 families.
