= Vorenjan =

Vorenjan ورنجان
- Village
- Location within Iran
- Coordinates: 33°33′18″N 59°09′16″E
- Country: Iran
- Province: South Khorasan
- County: Qaen
- Bakhsh: Central
- Rural District: Qaen

Population (2006)
  - Total: 51
- Time zone: UTC+3:30 (IRST)
  - Summer (DST): UTC+4:30 (IRDT)

Vorenjan (Persian: ورنجان, also Romanized as Vorenjān and Varenjān; also known as Biringu) is a village in Qaen Rural District, in the Central District of Qaen County, South Khorasan Province, Iran. At the 2006 census, its population was 51, in 15 families.
