= Bondeshk =

Bondeshk بندشك
- Village
- Location within Iran
- Coordinates: 32°21′13″N 59°11′43″E
- Country: Iran
- Province: South Khorasan
- County: Khusf
- Bakhsh: Jolgeh-e Mazhan
- Rural District: Qaleh Zari
- Time zone: UTC+3:30 (IRST)
  - Summer (DST): UTC+4:30 (IRDT)

Bondeshk (Persian: بندشك, also Romanized as Bandoshk and Bundishk; also known as Bandeshg Sofla) is a village in Qaleh Zari Rural District, Jolgeh-e Mazhan District, Khusf County, South Khorasan Province, Iran. At the 2006 census, its existence was noted and also about ten families were living there.
