= Kal-e Nakhab =

Kal-e Nakhab كال نخاب
- Village
- Location within Iran
- Coordinates: 33°42′28″N 57°16′20″E
- Country: Iran
- Province: South Khorasan
- County: Boshruyeh
- Bakhsh: Eresk
- Rural District: Raqqeh

Population (2006)
  - Total: 26
- Time zone: UTC+3:30 (IRST)
  - Summer (DST): UTC+4:30 (IRDT)

Kal-e Nakhab (Persian: كال نخاب, also Romanized as Kāl-e Nakhāb) is a village in Raqqeh Rural District, Eresk District, Boshruyeh County, South Khorasan Province, Iran. At the 2006 census, its population was 26, in 7 families.
