= Jan Mirza, South Khorasan =

Jan Mirza جان ميرزا
- Village
- Location within Iran
- Coordinates: 34°04′48″N 58°59′47″E
- Country: Iran
- Province: South Khorasan
- County: Qaen
- Bakhsh: Nimbeluk
- Rural District: Nimbeluk

Population (2006)
  - Total: 118
- Time zone: UTC+3:30 (IRST)
  - Summer (DST): UTC+4:30 (IRDT)

Jan Mirza (Persian: جان ميرزا, also Romanized as Jān Mīrzā) is a village in Nimbeluk Rural District, Nimbeluk District, Qaen County, South Khorasan Province, Iran. At the 2006 census, its population was 118, in 28 families.
