= Sharqonj =

Sharqonj شارقنج
- Village
- Location within Iran
- Coordinates: 33°05′57″N 59°13′51″E
- Country: Iran
- Province: South Khorasan
- County: Birjand
- Bakhsh: Central
- Rural District: Alqurat

Population (2006)
  - Total: 84
- Time zone: UTC+3:30 (IRST)
  - Summer (DST): UTC+4:30 (IRDT)

Sharqonj (Persian: شارقنج, also Romanized as Shārqonj, Shahrghunj, and Shahr-e Qonj; also known as Mashār Qonj and Shārqonj-e Bālā) is a village in Alqurat Rural District, in the Central District of Birjand County, South Khorasan Province, Iran. At the 2006 census, its population was 84, in 38 families.
