= Pichekan =

Pichekan پيچكان
- Village
- Location within Iran
- Coordinates: 33°23′04″N 60°01′49″E
- Country: Iran
- Province: South Khorasan
- County: Zirkuh
- Bakhsh: Central
- Rural District: Zirkuh

Population (2006)
  - Total: 77
- Time zone: UTC+3:30 (IRST)
  - Summer (DST): UTC+4:30 (IRDT)

Pichekan (Persian: پيچكان, also Romanized as Pīchekān and Pīchegān; also known as Pīchehkān, Qal‘eh Pishkūh, and Qal‘eh-ye Pīshkūh) is a village in Zirkuh Rural District, Central District, Zirkuh County, South Khorasan Province, Iran. At the 2006 census, its population was 77, in 21 families.
