= Galgun-e Bala =

Galgun-e Bala گلگون بالا
- Village
- Country: Iran
- Province: South Khorasan
- County: Khusf
- Bakhsh: Central District
- Rural District: Khusf

Population (2006)
  - Total: 83
- Time zone: UTC+3:30 (IRST)
  - Summer (DST): UTC+4:30 (IRDT)

Galgun-e Bala (Persian: گلگون بالا, also Romanized as Galgūn-e Bālā) is a village in Khusf Rural District, Central District, Khusf County, South Khorasan Province, Iran. At the 2006 census, its population was 83, in 21 families.
