= Gajikeh =

Gajikeh گجيكه
- Village
- Location within Iran
- Coordinates: 31°34′48″N 59°24′00″E
- Country: Iran
- Province: South Khorasan
- County: Nehbandan
- Bakhsh: Central
- Rural District: Meyghan

Population (2006)
  - Total: 54
- Time zone: UTC+3:30 (IRST)
  - Summer (DST): UTC+4:30 (IRDT)

Gajikeh (Persian: گجيكه, also Romanized as Gajīkeh) is a village in Meyghan Rural District, in the Central District of Nehbandan County, South Khorasan Province, Iran. At the 2006 census, its population was 54, in 13 families.
