= Cheshmeh-ye Gav =

Village in South Khorasan, Iran

Cheshmeh-ye Gav چشمه گاو
- Village
- Location within Iran
- Coordinates: 32°31′00″N 59°43′00″E
- Country: Iran
- Province: South Khorasan
- County: Sarbisheh
- Bakhsh: Mud
- Rural District: Naharjan

Population (2006)
  - Total: 47
- Time zone: UTC+3:30 (IRST)
  - Summer (DST): UTC+4:30 (IRDT)

Cheshmeh-ye Gav (Persian: چشمه گاو, also Romanized as Cheshmeh-ye Gāv, Chashmeh Gav, and Chashmeh-i-Gav) is a village in Naharjan Rural District, Mud District, Sarbisheh County, South Khorasan Province, Iran. According to the 2006 census, it had a population of 47 in 15 families.
