= Duskam =

Doostkam دوستكام
- Village
- Location within Iran
- Coordinates: 32°44′28″N 59°06′58″E
- Country: Iran
- Province: South Khorasan
- County: Khusf
- Bakhsh: Jolgeh-e Mazhan
- Rural District: Barakuh

Population (2006)
  - Total: 15
- Time zone: UTC+3:30 (IRST)
  - Summer (DST): UTC+4:30 (IRDT)

Doostkam (Persian: دوستكام, also Romanized as Doostkam; also known as Dūstkām) is a village in Barakuh Rural District, Jolgeh-e Mazhan District, Khusf County, South Khorasan Province, Iran. At the 2006 census, its population was 15, in 7 families.
