= Kalateh-ye Malek =

Kalateh-ye Malek كلاته ملك
- Village
- Location within Iran
- Coordinates: 32°50′01″N 58°53′59″E
- Country: Iran
- Province: South Khorasan
- County: Khusf
- Bakhsh: Central District
- Rural District: Khusf

Population (2006)
  - Total: 199
- Time zone: UTC+3:30 (IRST)
  - Summer (DST): UTC+4:30 (IRDT)

Kalateh-ye Malek (Persian: كلاته ملك, also Romanized as Kalāteh-ye Malek) is a village in Khusf Rural District, Central District, Khusf County, South Khorasan Province, Iran. At the 2006 census, its population was 199, in 57 families.
