= Seh Pud =

Seh Pud سه پود
- Village
- Location within Iran
- Coordinates: 31°36′20″N 60°40′45″E
- Country: Iran
- Province: South Khorasan
- County: Nehbandan
- Bakhsh: Central
- Rural District: Bandan

Population (2006)
  - Total: 81
- Time zone: UTC+3:30 (IRST)
  - Summer (DST): UTC+4:30 (IRDT)

Seh Pud (Persian: سه پود, also Romanized as Seh Pūd; also known as Sepūt) is a village in Bandan Rural District, in the Central District of Nehbandan County, South Khorasan Province, Iran. At the 2006 census, its population was 81, in 19 families.
