= Kachak Ali =

Kachak Ali كچك علي
- Village
- Country: Iran
- Province: South Khorasan
- County: Nehbandan
- Bakhsh: Central
- Rural District: Neh

Population (2006)
  - Total: 37
- Time zone: UTC+3:30 (IRST)
  - Summer (DST): UTC+4:30 (IRDT)

Kachak Ali (Persian: كچك علي, also Romanized as Kachaḵ ʿAlī; also known as Kūch Kālī) is a village in Neh Rural District, in the Central District of Nehbandan County, South Khorasan Province, Iran. At the 2006 census, its population was 37, in 7 families.
