= Gerdtigh =

Gerdtigh گردتيغ
- Village
- Location within Iran
- Coordinates: 33°50′16″N 59°38′47″E
- Country: Iran
- Province: South Khorasan
- County: Qaen
- Bakhsh: Central
- Rural District: Qaen

Population (2006)
  - Total: 79
- Time zone: UTC+3:30 (IRST)
  - Summer (DST): UTC+4:30 (IRDT)

Gerdtigh (Persian: گردتيغ, also Romanized as Gerdtīgh and Gertīgh) is a village in Qaen Rural District, in the Central District of Qaen County, South Khorasan Province, Iran. At the 2006 census, its population was 79, in 19 families.
