= Anjul =

Anjul انجول
- Village
- Location within Iran
- Coordinates: 33°34′54″N 59°08′42″E
- Country: Iran
- Province: South Khorasan
- County: Qaen
- Bakhsh: Central
- Rural District: Qaen

Population (2006)
  - Total: 52
- Time zone: UTC+3:30 (IRST)
  - Summer (DST): UTC+4:30 (IRDT)

Anjul (Persian: انجول, also Romanized as Ānjūl and Anjūl) is a village in Qaen Rural District, in the Central District of Qaen County, South Khorasan Province, Iran. At the 2006 census, its population was 52, in 24 families. Its birthday is September 19.
