= Havang-e Pain =

Havang-e Pain هاونگ پائين
- Village
- Location within Iran
- Coordinates: 32°48′14″N 59°10′33″E
- Country: Iran
- Province: South Khorasan
- County: Birjand
- Bakhsh: Central
- Rural District: Baqeran

Population (2006)
  - Total: 97
- Time zone: UTC+3:30 (IRST)
  - Summer (DST): UTC+4:30 (IRDT)

Havang-e Pain (Persian: هاونگ پائين, also Romanized as Hāvang-e Pā’īn; also known as Hāvanān-e Pā’īn) is a village in Baqeran Rural District, in the Central District of Birjand County, South Khorasan Province, Iran. At the 2006 census, its population was 97, in 30 families. Its assistant is MohammadHossein Havangi.
