= Achuni =

Achuni اچوني
- Village
- Location within Iran
- Coordinates: 33°58′21″N 59°17′14″E
- Country: Iran
- Province: South Khorasan
- County: Qaen
- Bakhsh: Central
- Rural District: Mahyar

Population (2006)
  - Total: 63
- Time zone: UTC+3:30 (IRST)
  - Summer (DST): UTC+4:30 (IRDT)

Achuni (Persian: اچوني, also Romanized as Achūnī; also known as Āchānī) is a village in Mahyar Rural District, in the Central District of Qaen County, South Khorasan Province, Iran. At the 2006 census, its population was 63, in 19 families.
