= Tajnud =

Tajnud تجنود
- Village
- Location within Iran
- Coordinates: 33°19′21″N 60°14′31″E
- Country: Iran
- Province: South Khorasan
- County: Zirkuh
- Bakhsh: Central
- Rural District: Zirkuh

Population (2006)
  - Total: 254
- Time zone: UTC+3:30 (IRST)
  - Summer (DST): UTC+4:30 (IRDT)

Tajnud (Persian: تجنود, also Romanized as Tajnūd and Tejnūd; also known as Qal‘eh Tajnūd) is a village in Zirkuh Rural District, Central District, Zirkuh County, South Khorasan Province, Iran. At the 2006 census, its population was 254, in 54 families.
