= Qurian =

Qurian قوريان
- Village
- Location within Iran
- Coordinates: 32°35′20″N 58°58′16″E
- Country: Iran
- Province: South Khorasan
- County: Khusf
- Bakhsh: Jolgeh-e Mazhan
- Rural District: Jolgeh-e Mazhan

Population (2006)
  - Total: 80
- Time zone: UTC+3:30 (IRST)
  - Summer (DST): UTC+4:30 (IRDT)

Qurian (Persian: قوريان, also Romanized as Qūrīān, Qoryān, and Ghooriyan) is a village in Jolgeh-e Mazhan Rural District, Jolgeh-e Mazhan District, Khusf County, South Khorasan Province, Iran. At the 2006 census, its population was 80, in 18 families.
