= Samafat =

Samafat سمافات
- Village
- Location within Iran
- Coordinates: 31°45′28″N 59°47′26″E
- Country: Iran
- Province: South Khorasan
- County: Nehbandan
- Bakhsh: Central
- Rural District: Neh

Population (2006)
  - Total: 94
- Time zone: UTC+3:30 (IRST)
  - Summer (DST): UTC+4:30 (IRDT)

Samafat (Persian: سمافات, also romanized as Samāfāt, Semafat and Semāfāt) is a village in Neh Rural District, in the Central District of Nehbandan County, South Khorasan Province, Iran. At the 2006 census, its population was 94, in 26 families.
