= Kalateh-ye Mehrak =

Kalateh-ye Mehrak كلاته مهرك
- Village
- Location within Iran
- Coordinates: 33°35′06″N 59°55′49″E
- Country: Iran
- Province: South Khorasan
- County: Zirkuh
- Bakhsh: Central
- Rural District: Zirkuh

Population (2006)
  - Total: 184
- Time zone: UTC+3:30 (IRST)
  - Summer (DST): UTC+4:30 (IRDT)

Kalateh-ye Mehrak (Persian: كلاته مهرك, also Romanized as Kalāteh-ye Mehrak; also known as Mehrak) is a village in Zirkuh Rural District, Central District, Zirkuh County, South Khorasan Province, Iran. At the 2006 census, its population was 184, in 42 families.
