= Dasteh Qich =

Dasteh Qich دسته قيچ
- Village
- Location within Iran
- Coordinates: 32°38′49″N 59°54′16″E
- Country: Iran
- Province: South Khorasan
- County: Sarbisheh
- Bakhsh: Central
- Rural District: Momenabad

Population (2006)
  - Total: 46
- Time zone: UTC+3:30 (IRST)
  - Summer (DST): UTC+4:30 (IRDT)

Dasteh Qich (Persian: دسته قيچ, also Romanized as Dasteh Qīch; also known as Dastāqīch, Dasht-e Qīch, Dastghich, and Dast Qīch) is a village in Momenabad Rural District, in the Central District of Sarbisheh County, South Khorasan Province, Iran. According to the 2006 census, it had a population of 46 in 18 families.
