= Hoseyn Hyati =

Hoseyn Hyati حسين حياتي
- Village
- Country: Iran
- Province: South Khorasan
- County: Sarbisheh
- Bakhsh: Central
- Rural District: Momenabad

Population (2006)
  - Total: 34
- Time zone: UTC+3:30 (IRST)
  - Summer (DST): UTC+4:30 (IRDT)

Hoseyn Hyati (Persian: حسين حياتي, also Romanized as Ḩoseyn Ḩyātī; also known as Kalāteh-ye Ḩoseyn Ḩyātī) is a village in Momenabad Rural District, in the Central District of Sarbisheh County, South Khorasan Province, Iran. At the 2006 census, its population was 34, in 9 families.
