= Khavaz =

Khavaz خاواز
- Village
- Location within Iran
- Coordinates: 32°40′01″N 59°32′17″E
- Country: Iran
- Province: South Khorasan
- County: Sarbisheh
- Bakhsh: Mud
- Rural District: Mud

Population (2006)
  - Total: 29
- Time zone: UTC+3:30 (IRST)
  - Summer (DST): UTC+4:30 (IRDT)

Khavaz (Persian: خاواز, also Romanized as Khāvāz and Khāwāz) is a village in Mud Rural District, Mud District, Sarbisheh County, South Khorasan Province, Iran. At the 2006 census, its population was +300, in 30 families.
