= Kalateh-ye Bazdid =

Kalateh-ye Bazdid كلاته بازديد
- Village
- Location within Iran
- Coordinates: 32°40′32″N 59°30′18″E
- Country: Iran
- Province: South Khorasan
- County: Sarbisheh
- Bakhsh: Mud
- Rural District: Mud

Population (2006)
  - Total: 45
- Time zone: UTC+3:30 (IRST)
  - Summer (DST): UTC+4:30 (IRDT)

Kalateh-ye Bazdid (Persian: كلاته بازديد, also Romanized as Kalāteh-ye Bāzdīd) is a village in Mud Rural District, Mud District, Sarbisheh County, South Khorasan Province, Iran. At the 2006 census, its population was 45, in 17 families.
