= Buteh Zirg =

Buteh Zirg بوته زيرگ
- Village
- Country: Iran
- Province: South Khorasan
- County: Darmian
- Bakhsh: Qohestan
- Rural District: Qohestan

Population (2006)
  - Total: 222
- Time zone: UTC+3:30 (IRST)
  - Summer (DST): UTC+4:30 (IRDT)

Buteh Zirg (Persian: بوته زيرگ, also Romanized as Būteh Zīrg) is a village in Qohestan Rural District, Qohestan District, Darmian County, South Khorasan Province, Iran. At the 2006 census, its population was 222, in 52 families.
