= Cheshmeh-ye Gazu =

Cheshmeh-ye Gazu چشمه گزو
- Village
- Country: Iran
- Province: South Khorasan
- County: Birjand
- Bakhsh: Central
- Rural District: Baqeran

Population (2006)
  - Total: 16
- Time zone: UTC+3:30 (IRST)
  - Summer (DST): UTC+4:30 (IRDT)

Cheshmeh-ye Gazu (Persian: چشمه گزو, also Romanized as Cheshmeh-ye Gazū) is a village in Baqeran Rural District, in the Central District of Birjand County, South Khorasan Province, Iran. At the 2006 census, its population was 16, in 6 families.
