= Cheshmeh Raj =

Cheshmeh Raj چشمه رج
- Village
- Location within Iran
- Coordinates: 32°50′03″N 59°32′18″E
- Country: Iran
- Province: South Khorasan
- County: Sarbisheh
- Bakhsh: Mud
- Rural District: Mud

Population (2006)
  - Total: 104
- Time zone: UTC+3:30 (IRST)
  - Summer (DST): UTC+4:30 (IRDT)

Cheshmeh Raj (Persian: چشمه رج; also known as Cheshmeh Rīj, Cheshmeh Reyj, and Cheshmeh Rīch) is a village in Mud Rural District, Mud District, Sarbisheh County, South Khorasan Province, Iran. According to the 2006 census, it had a population of 104 in 32 families.
