= Gidesk =

Gidesk گيدسك
- Village
- Location within Iran
- Coordinates: 32°22′37″N 59°18′53″E
- Country: Iran
- Province: South Khorasan
- County: Sarbisheh
- Bakhsh: Mud
- Rural District: Naharjan

Population (2006)
  - Total: 29
- Time zone: UTC+3:30 (IRST)
  - Summer (DST): UTC+4:30 (IRDT)

Gidesk (Persian: گيدسك, also Romanized as Gīdesk, Gīdesg, and Gidisk) is a village in Naharjan Rural District, Mud District, Sarbisheh County, South Khorasan Province, Iran. At the 2006 census, its population was 29, in 11 families.
