= Chah Bargi =

Chah Bargi چاه برگي
- Village
- Location within Iran
- Coordinates: 32°26′03″N 59°15′18″E
- Country: Iran
- Province: South Khorasan
- County: Sarbisheh
- Bakhsh: Mud
- Rural District: Naharjan

Population (2006)
  - Total: 10
- Time zone: UTC+3:30 (IRST)
  - Summer (DST): UTC+4:30 (IRDT)

Chah Bargi (Persian: چاه برگي, also Romanized as Chāh Bargī) is a village in Naharjan Rural District, Mud District, Sarbisheh County, South Khorasan Province, Iran. According to the 2006 census, it had a population of 10 in 4 families.
