= Mahvaj =

Mahvaj مهواج
- Village
- Location within Iran
- Coordinates: 33°46′50″N 59°01′40″E
- Country: Iran
- Province: South Khorasan
- County: Qaen
- Bakhsh: Central
- Rural District: Qaen

Population (2006)
  - Total: 361
- Time zone: UTC+3:30 (IRST)
  - Summer (DST): UTC+4:30 (IRDT)

Mahvaj (Persian: مهواج, also Romanized as Mahvāj and Ma‘vāj) is a village in Qaen Rural District, in the Central District of Qaen County, South Khorasan Province, Iran. At the 2006 census, its population was 361, in 77 families.
