= Golandar =

Golandar گلندر
- Village
- Location within Iran
- Coordinates: 32°24′02″N 59°39′49″E
- Country: Iran
- Province: South Khorasan
- County: Sarbisheh
- Bakhsh: Central
- Rural District: Momenabad

Population (2006)
  - Total: 124
- Time zone: UTC+3:30 (IRST)
  - Summer (DST): UTC+4:30 (IRDT)

Golandar (Persian: گلندر, also Romanized as Gulandar; also known as Golandām) is a village in Momenabad Rural District, in the Central District of Sarbisheh County, South Khorasan Province, Iran. At the 2006 census, its population was 124, in 34 families.
