= Agholdar =

Agholdar اغلدر
- Village
- Location within Iran
- Coordinates: 33°04′30″N 59°14′33″E
- Country: Iran
- Province: South Khorasan
- County: Birjand
- Bakhsh: Central
- Rural District: Alqurat

Population (2006)
  - Total: 36
- Time zone: UTC+3:30 (IRST)
  - Summer (DST): UTC+4:30 (IRDT)

Agholdar (Persian: اغلدر, also Romanized as Āgholdar and Aghol Dar) is a village in Alqurat Rural District, in the Central District of Birjand County, South Khorasan Province, Iran. At the 2006 census, its population was 36, in 11 families.
