= Mehtaran, Iran =

Mehtaran مهتران
- Village
- Location within Iran
- Coordinates: 32°47′44″N 59°16′32″E
- Country: Iran
- Province: South Khorasan
- County: Birjand
- Bakhsh: Central
- Rural District: Baqeran

Population (2006)
  - Total: 23
- Time zone: UTC+3:30 (IRST)
  - Summer (DST): UTC+4:30 (IRDT)

Mehtaran (Persian: مهتران, also Romanized as Mehtarān; also known as Kalāteh-ye Mehtarān) is a village in Baqeran Rural District, in the Central District of Birjand County, South Khorasan Province, Iran. At the 2006 census, its population was 23, in 6 families.
