= Ivask =

Ivask ايواسك
- Village
- Location within Iran
- Coordinates: 31°38′53″N 59°25′04″E
- Country: Iran
- Province: South Khorasan
- County: Nehbandan
- Bakhsh: Central
- Rural District: Meyghan

Population (2006)
  - Total: 37
- Time zone: UTC+3:30 (IRST)
  - Summer (DST): UTC+4:30 (IRDT)

Ivask (Persian: ايواسك, also Romanized as Īvāsk; also known as Hivask) is a village in Meyghan Rural District, in the Central District of Nehbandan County, South Khorasan Province, Iran. At the 2006 census, its population was 37, in 9 families.
