= Mehrak =

Mehrak مهرك
- village
- Location within Iran
- Coordinates: 33°25′08″N 59°45′12″E
- Country: Iran
- Province: South Khorasan
- County: Zirkuh
- Bakhsh: Zohan
- Rural District: Zohan

Population (2006)
  - Total: 202
- Time zone: UTC+3:30 (IRST)
  - Summer (DST): UTC+4:30 (IRDT)

Mehrak (Persian: مهرك; also known as Mehrak Lāghereh and Rūd-e Mardak) is a village in Zohan Rural District, Zohan District, Zirkuh County, South Khorasan Province, Iran. At the 2006 census, its population was 202, in 53 families.
