= Alqur =

Alqur القور
- Village
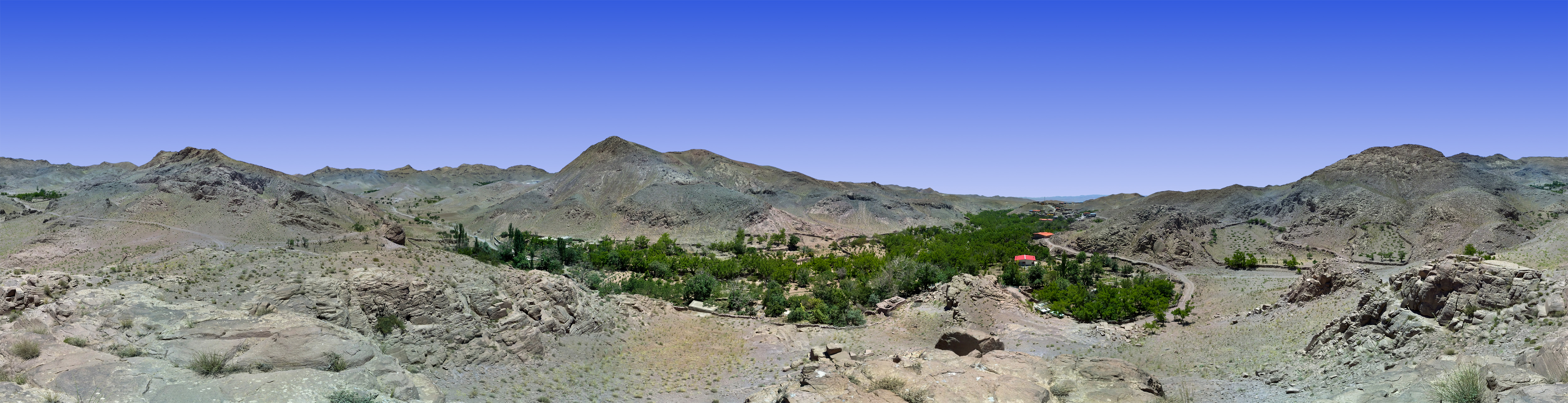
- Panorama image of Alqur or Alghoor village, Iran

- Location within Iran
- Coordinates: 33°04′53″N 59°21′00″E
- Country: Iran
- Province: South Khorasan
- County: Birjand
- Bakhsh: Central
- Rural District: Alqurat

Population (2006)
  - Total: 64
- Time zone: UTC+3:30 (IRST)
  - Summer (DST): UTC+4:30 (IRDT)

Alqur (Persian: القور, also Romanized as Alqūr and Alghūr) is a village in Alqurat Rural District, in the Central District of Birjand County, South Khorasan Province, Iran. At the 2006 census, its population was 64, in 38 families.
