= Mosaveri =

Mosaveri مساوري
- Village
- Location within Iran
- Coordinates: 32°48′00″N 59°04′57″E
- Country: Iran
- Province: South Khorasan
- County: Birjand
- Bakhsh: Central
- Rural District: Baqeran

Population (2006)
  - Total: 41
- Time zone: UTC+3:30 (IRST)
  - Summer (DST): UTC+4:30 (IRDT)

Mosaveri (Persian: مساوري, also Romanized as Mosāverī and Musāveri) is a village in Baqeran Rural District, in the Central District of Birjand County, South Khorasan Province, Iran. At the 2006 census, its population was 41, in 12 families.
