= Boz Qonj =

Boz Qonj بزقنج
- Village
- Location within Iran
- Coordinates: 33°05′00″N 59°22′03″E
- Country: Iran
- Province: South Khorasan
- County: Birjand
- Bakhsh: Central
- Rural District: Alqurat

Population (2006)
  - Total: 185
- Time zone: UTC+3:30 (IRST)
  - Summer (DST): UTC+4:30 (IRDT)

Boz Qonj (Persian: بزقنج, also Romanized as Bozqūnj and Buzghunj) is a village in Alqurat Rural District, in the Central District of Birjand County, South Khorasan Province, Iran. At the 2006 census, its population was 185, in 57 families.
