= Mortavand =

Mortavand مرتوند
- Village
- Location within Iran
- Coordinates: 32°41′32″N 59°30′20″E
- Country: Iran
- Province: South Khorasan
- County: Sarbisheh
- Bakhsh: Mud
- Rural District: Mud

Population (2006)
  - Total: 14
- Time zone: UTC+3:30 (IRST)
  - Summer (DST): UTC+4:30 (IRDT)

Mortavand (Persian: مرتوند, also known as Mūrtavand, Mowrūtak-e Bālā, Murtavand, Murtawand, and Mūrūtak-e Bālā) is a village in Mud Rural District, Mud District, Sarbisheh County, South Khorasan Province, Iran. In the 2006 census, it had a population of 14 people in 6 different families.
