= Panhani =

Panhani پنهاني
- Village
- Location within Iran
- Coordinates: 31°51′35″N 59°37′38″E
- Country: Iran
- Province: South Khorasan
- County: Nehbandan
- Bakhsh: Central
- Rural District: Meyghan

Population (2006)
  - Total: 109
- Time zone: UTC+3:30 (IRST)
  - Summer (DST): UTC+4:30 (IRDT)

Panhani (Persian: پنهاني, also Romanized as Panhānī; also known as Panhān) is a village in Meyghan Rural District, in the Central District of Nehbandan County, South Khorasan Province, Iran. At the 2006 census, its population was 109, in 30 families.
