= Sheybani, South Khorasan =

Sheybani شيباني
- Village
- Location within Iran
- Coordinates: 34°27′58″N 57°16′50″E
- Country: Iran
- Province: South Khorasan
- County: Boshruyeh
- Bakhsh: Central
- Rural District: Ali Jamal

Population (2006)
  - Total: 29
- Time zone: UTC+3:30 (IRST)
  - Summer (DST): UTC+4:30 (IRDT)

Sheybani (Persian: شيباني, also Romanized as Sheybānī; also known as Kalāteh-ye Sheybānī) is a village in Ali Jamal Rural District, in the Central District of Boshruyeh County, South Khorasan Province, Iran. At the 2006 census, its population was 29, in 11 families.
