= Gazond, South Khorasan =

Gazond گزند
- Village
- Location within Iran
- Coordinates: 32°46′19″N 59°54′23″E
- Country: Iran
- Province: South Khorasan
- County: Darmian
- Bakhsh: Central
- Rural District: Darmian

Population (2006)
  - Total: 73
- Time zone: UTC+3:30 (IRST)
  - Summer (DST): UTC+4:30 (IRDT)

Gazond (Persian: گزند; also known as Gūzān) is a village in Darmian Rural District, in the Central District of Darmian County, South Khorasan Province, Iran. At the 2006 census, its population was 73, in 18 families.
