= Piranj =

Piranj پيرانج
- Village
- Location within Iran
- Coordinates: 33°02′05″N 59°19′29″E
- Country: Iran
- Province: South Khorasan
- County: Birjand
- Bakhsh: Central
- Rural District: Alqurat

Population (2006)
  - Total: 51
- Time zone: UTC+3:30 (IRST)
  - Summer (DST): UTC+4:30 (IRDT)

Piranj (Persian: پيرانج, also romanized as Pīrānj, Pīronj, Pīrānch, Piraund, and Pīrunj ) is a village in Alqurat Rural District, in the Central District of Birjand County, South Khorasan Province, Iran. At the 2006 census, its population was 51, in 17 families.
