= Narreh Sang-e Bala =

Narreh Sang-e Bala نره سنگ بالا
- Village
- Location within Iran
- Coordinates: 32°45′26″N 59°50′20″E
- Country: Iran
- Province: South Khorasan
- County: Sarbisheh
- Bakhsh: Central
- Rural District: Momenabad

Population (2006)
  - Total: 33
- Time zone: UTC+3:30 (IRST)
  - Summer (DST): UTC+4:30 (IRDT)

Narreh Sang-e Bala (Persian: نره سنگ بالا, also Romanized as Narreh Sang-e Bālā and Narah Sang-e Bālā; also known as Nareh Sang Olya, Narreh Sang-i-Buzurg, and Narreh Sanq-e Bozorg) is a village in Momenabad Rural District, in the Central District of Sarbisheh County, South Khorasan Province, Iran. At the 2006 census, its population was 33, in 11 families.
