= Mahmiran =

Mahmiran ماهميران
- Village
- Location within Iran
- Coordinates: 32°59′11″N 58°47′55″E
- Country: Iran
- Province: South Khorasan
- County: Khusf
- Bakhsh: Central District
- Rural District: Khusf

Population (2006)
  - Total: 126
- Time zone: UTC+3:30 (IRST)
  - Summer (DST): UTC+4:30 (IRDT)

Mahmiran (Persian: ماهميران, also Romanized as Māhmīrān and Māmīrān; also known as Bāmīrān) is a village in Khusf Rural District, Central District, Khusf County, South Khorasan Province, Iran. At the 2006 census, its population was 126, in 33 families.
