= Kalateh-ye Mohammad Soltan =

Kalateh-ye Mohammad Soltan کلاته محمدسلطان
- Village
- Location within Iran
- Coordinates: 32°53′32″N 59°30′50″E
- Country: Iran
- Province: South Khorasan
- County: Birjand
- Bakhsh: Central
- Rural District: Kahshang

Population (2016)
  - Total: 86
- Time zone: UTC+3:30 (IRST)
  - Summer (DST): UTC+4:30 (IRDT)

Kalateh-ye Mohammad Soltan (Persian: کلاته محمدسلطان, also Romanized as Kalāteh-ye Moḩammad Solţān and Kalāteh Moḩammad Solţān; also known as Kalāt-e Moḩammad Solţān, Kalāte Moḩammad Solţan, and Moḩammad Solţān) is a village in Kahshang Rural District, in the Central District of Birjand County, South Khorasan Province, Iran. At the 2016 census, its population was 86, in 25 families.
