= Gorazan =

Gorazan گرازان
- Village
- Location within Iran
- Coordinates: 33°31′42″N 59°26′31″E
- Country: Iran
- Province: South Khorasan
- County: Zirkuh
- Bakhsh: Zohan
- Rural District: Afin

Population (2006)
  - Total: 170
- Time zone: UTC+3:30 (IRST)
  - Summer (DST): UTC+4:30 (IRDT)

Gorazan (Persian: گرازان, also Romanized as Gorāzān; also known as Gorāzū) is a village in Afin Rural District, Zohan District, Zirkuh County, South Khorasan Province, Iran. In 2006, its population was 170, in 46 families.
