= Nargandal =

Nargandal نارگندل
- Village
- Location within Iran
- Coordinates: 33°30′08″N 59°08′53″E
- Country: Iran
- Province: South Khorasan
- County: Qaen
- Bakhsh: Sedeh
- Rural District: Afriz

Population (2006)
  - Total: 78
- Time zone: UTC+3:30 (IRST)
  - Summer (DST): UTC+4:30 (IRDT)

Nargandal (Persian: نارگندل, also Romanized as Nārgandal; also known as Na‘l Kandal, Nālgand, Nālgandeh, and Nālkandar) is a village in Afriz Rural District, Sedeh District, Qaen County, South Khorasan Province, Iran. At the 2006 census, its population was 78, in 23 families.
