= Murutak =

Murutak موروتك
- Village
- Location within Iran
- Coordinates: 32°40′39″N 59°29′22″E
- Country: Iran
- Province: South Khorasan
- County: Sarbisheh
- Bakhsh: Mud
- Rural District: Mud

Population (2006)
  - Total: 16
- Time zone: UTC+3:30 (IRST)
  - Summer (DST): UTC+4:30 (IRDT)

Murutak (Persian: موروتك, also Romanized as Mūrūtak; also known as Mūrūtak-e Pā’īn and Mūrtak-e Pā’īn) is a village in Mud Rural District, Mud District, Sarbisheh County, South Khorasan Province, Iran. At the 2006 census, its population was 16, in 4 families.
