= Boqrai =

Boqrai بقرايي
- Village
- Location within Iran
- Coordinates: 33°30′57″N 60°04′03″E
- Country: Iran
- Province: South Khorasan
- County: Zirkuh
- Bakhsh: Central District
- Rural District: Zirkuh

Population (2006)
  - Total: 281
- Time zone: UTC+3:30 (IRST)
  - Summer (DST): UTC+4:30 (IRDT)

Boqrai (Persian: بقرايي, also Romanized as Boqrā’ī; also known as Boqrá) is a village in Zirkuh Rural District, Central District, Zirkuh County, South Khorasan Province, Iran. At the 2006 census, its population was 281, in 82 families.
