= Howz-e Hasan Ali =

Howz-e Hasan Ali حوض حسنعلي
- Village
- Country: Iran
- Province: South Khorasan
- County: Khusf
- Bakhsh: Central District
- Rural District: Khusf

Population (2006)
  - Total: 7
- Time zone: UTC+3:30 (IRST)
  - Summer (DST): UTC+4:30 (IRDT)

Howz-e Hasan Ali (Persian: حوض حسنعلي, also Romanized as Ḩowz̤-e Ḩasan ʿAlī) is a village in Khusf Rural District, Central District, Khusf County, South Khorasan Province, Iran. At the 2006 census, its population was 7, in 5 families.
