= Estunand =

Estunand استونند
- Village
- Location within Iran
- Coordinates: 31°43′35″N 59°54′17″E
- Country: Iran
- Province: South Khorasan
- County: Nehbandan
- Bakhsh: Central
- Rural District: Neh

Population (2006)
  - Total: 99
- Time zone: UTC+3:30 (IRST)
  - Summer (DST): UTC+4:30 (IRDT)

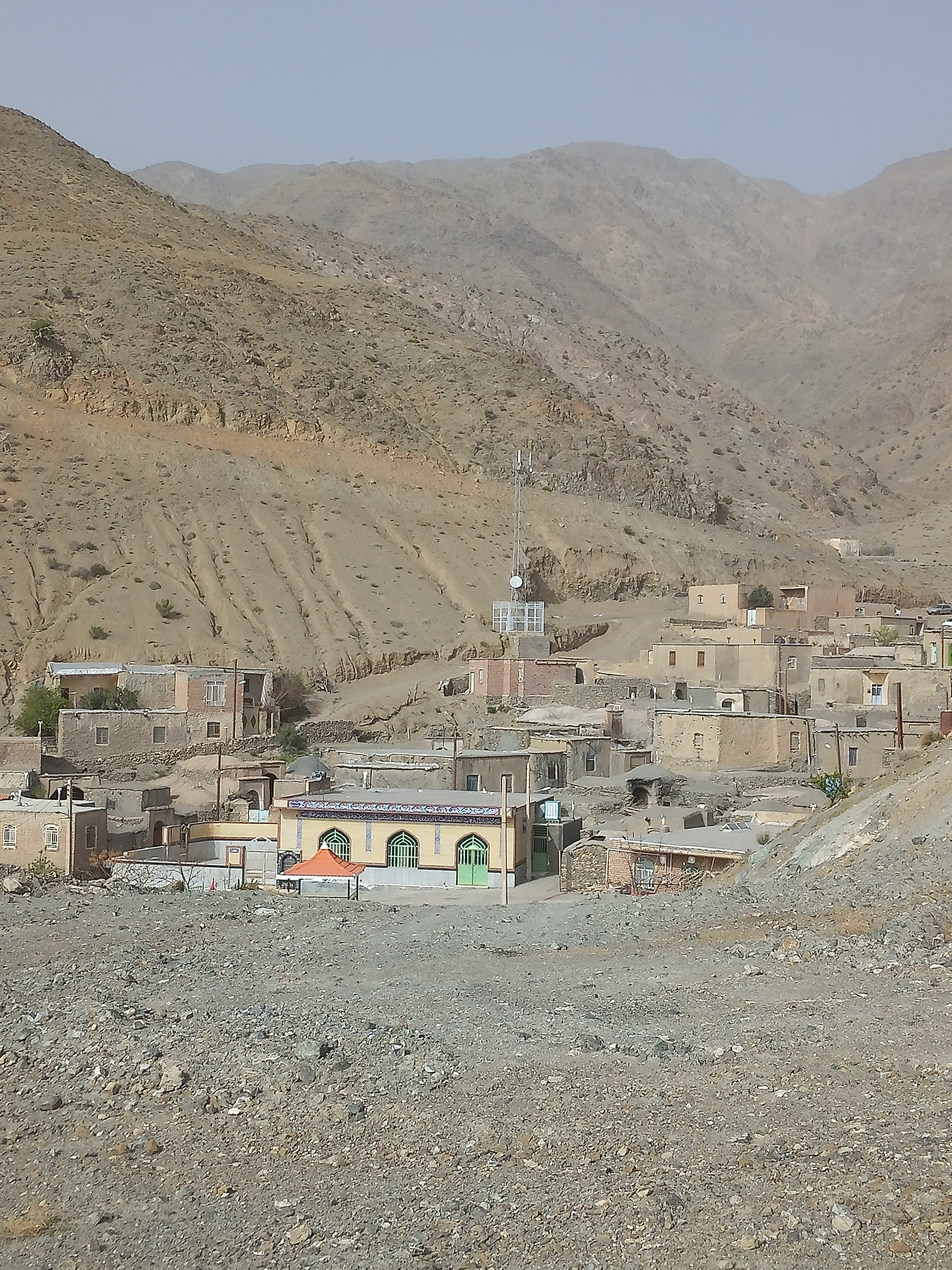
Estunand in 2022

Estunand (Persian: استونند, also Romanized as Estūnand; also known as Estānend, Estānīd, and Stānind) is a village in Neh Rural District, in the Central District of Nehbandan County, South Khorasan Province, Iran. At the 2006 census, its population was 99, in 35 families.
