= Tangal-e Ali Beyk =

Tangal-e Ali Beyk تنگل علي بيك
- Village
- Country: Iran
- Province: South Khorasan
- County: Birjand
- Bakhsh: Central
- Rural District: Baqeran

Population (2006)
  - Total: 28
- Time zone: UTC+3:30 (IRST)
  - Summer (DST): UTC+4:30 (IRDT)

Tangal-e Ali Beyk (Persian: تنگل علي بيك, also Romanized as Tangal-e ʿAlī Beyḵ) is a village in Baqeran Rural District, in the Central District of Birjand County, South Khorasan Province, Iran. At the 2006 census, its population was 28, in 9 families.
