= Qik-e Pain =

Qik-e Pain قيك پائين/ قيك سفلي /
- Village
- Location within Iran
- Coordinates: 32°44′29″N 59°59′50″E
- Country: Iran
- Province: South Khorasan
- County: Darmian
- Bakhsh: Central
- Rural District: Darmian

Population (2006)
  - Total: 164
- Time zone: UTC+3:30 (IRST)
  - Summer (DST): UTC+4:30 (IRDT)

Qik-e Pain (Persian: قيك پائين/ قيك سفلي /, also Romanized as Qīḵ-e Pā’īn , Qehk-e Pā’īn, Qahak-e Pā’īn, and Qehak Pā’īn; also known as Qīḵ-e Soflá) is a village in Darmian Rural District, in the Central District of Darmian County, South Khorasan Province, Iran. At the 2006 census, its population was 164, in 46 families.
