= Kalateh-ye Nazar =

Kalateh-ye Nazar كلاته نظر
- Village
- Country: Iran
- Province: South Khorasan
- County: Darmian
- Bakhsh: Central
- Rural District: Darmian

Population (2006)
  - Total: 175
- Time zone: UTC+3:30 (IRST)
  - Summer (DST): UTC+4:30 (IRDT)

Kalateh-ye Nazar (Persian: كلاته نظر, also Romanized as Kalāteh-ye Naẓar) is a village in Darmian Rural District, in the Central District of Darmian County, South Khorasan Province, Iran. At the 2006 census, its population was 175, in 41 families.
