= Tag-e Oshtoran =

Tag-e Oshtoran Persian: تگ اشتران, romanized: Ṫag-e Oshṫorān
- Village
- Location within Iran
- Coordinates: 32°45′17″N 59°17′20″E
- Country: Iran
- Province: South Khorasan
- County: Birjand
- Bakhsh: Central
- Rural District: Baqeran

Population (2006)
  - Total: 23
- Time zone: UTC+3:30 (IRST)
  - Summer (DST): UTC+4:30 (IRDT)

Tag-e Oshtoran (Persian: تگ اشتران, romanized: Ṫag-e Oshṫorān, also Romanized as Tag-e Oshtorān and Tak Oshtorān; also known as Ṫāgeshṫerow and Ṫagoshṫorū) is a village in Baqeran Rural District, in the Central District of Birjand County, South Khorasan Province, Iran. At the 2006 census, its population was 23, in 7 families. In 2017, a shooting left 2 dead and one injured.

== See also ==
- Greater Khorasan
- Khorasan Province
