= Mafriz =

Mafriz مافريز
- Village
- Location within Iran
- Coordinates: 33°04′13″N 59°21′31″E
- Country: Iran
- Province: South Khorasan
- County: Birjand
- Bakhsh: Central
- Rural District: Alqurat

Population (2006)
  - Total: 88
- Time zone: UTC+3:30 (IRST)
  - Summer (DST): UTC+4:30 (IRDT)

Mafriz (Persian: مافريز, also Romanized as Māfrīz, Māfarīz, Mofrīs, and Mufris) is a village in Alqurat Rural District, in the Central District of Birjand County, South Khorasan Province, Iran. At the 2006 census, its population was 88, in 29 families.
