= Jang-e Chah =

Jang-e Chah جنگ چاه
- Village
- Country: Iran
- Province: South Khorasan
- County: Nehbandan
- Bakhsh: Central
- Rural District: Bandan

Population (2006)
  - Total: 96
- Time zone: UTC+3:30 (IRST)
  - Summer (DST): UTC+4:30 (IRDT)

Jang-e Chah (Persian: جنگ چاه, also Romanized as Jang-e Chāh; also known as Jang-e Jā) is a village in Bandan Rural District, in the Central District of Nehbandan County, South Khorasan Province, Iran. At the 2006 census, its population was 96, in 15 families.
