= Solami =

Solami سلمي
- Village
- Country: Iran
- Province: South Khorasan
- County: Khusf
- Bakhsh: Jolgeh-e Mazhan
- Rural District: Qaleh Zari

Population (2006)
  - Total: 179
- Time zone: UTC+3:30 (IRST)
  - Summer (DST): UTC+4:30 (IRDT)

Solami (Persian: سلمي, also Romanized as Solamī; also known as Solameh) is a village in Qaleh Zari Rural District, Jolgeh-e Mazhan District, Khusf County, South Khorasan Province, Iran. At the 2006 census, its population was 179, in 46 families.
