= Kalateh-ye Fathollahi =

Kalateh-ye Fathollahi كلاته فتح الهي
- Village
- Location within Iran
- Coordinates: 32°40′25″N 59°35′26″E
- Country: Iran
- Province: South Khorasan
- County: Sarbisheh
- Bakhsh: Mud
- Rural District: Mud

Population (2006)
  - Total: 61
- Time zone: UTC+3:30 (IRST)
  - Summer (DST): UTC+4:30 (IRDT)

Kalateh-ye Fathollahi (Persian: كلاته فتح الهي, also Romanized as Kalāteh-ye Fatḩollāhī and Kalāteh-i-Fathullah; also known as Fatḩollāhī, Fatḩ Elāhī, and Kalateh Mālāleh) is a village in Mud Rural District, Mud District, Sarbisheh County, South Khorasan Province, Iran. At the 2006 census, its population was 61, in 14 families.
