= Mahlujan =

Mahlujan مهلوجان
- Village
- Location within Iran
- Coordinates: 32°36′24″N 59°32′01″E
- Country: Iran
- Province: South Khorasan
- County: Sarbisheh
- Bakhsh: Mud
- Rural District: Naharjan

Population (2006)
  - Total: 25
- Time zone: UTC+3:30 (IRST)
  - Summer (DST): UTC+4:30 (IRDT)

Mahlujan (Persian: مهلوجان, also Romanized as Maḩlūjān; also known as Maḩlūgān) is a village in Naharjan Rural District, Mud District, Sarbisheh County, South Khorasan Province, Iran. At the 2006 census, its population was 25, in 8 families.
