= Jan Mahmud =

Jan Mahmud جان محمود
- Village
- Location within Iran
- Coordinates: 31°51′46″N 59°51′41″E
- Country: Iran
- Province: South Khorasan
- County: Nehbandan
- Bakhsh: Shusef
- Rural District: Shusef

Population (2006)
  - Total: 22
- Time zone: UTC+3:30 (IRST)
  - Summer (DST): UTC+4:30 (IRDT)

Jan Mahmud (Persian: جان محمود, also Romanized as Jān Maḩmūd) is a village in Shusef Rural District, Shusef District, Nehbandan County, South Khorasan Province, Iran. At the 2006 census, its population was 22, in 7 families.
