= Kalateh-ye Qassab, Khusf =

Kalateh-ye Qassab كلاته قصاب
- Village
- Location within Iran
- Coordinates: 32°50′38″N 58°49′27″E
- Country: Iran
- Province: South Khorasan
- County: Khusf
- Bakhsh: Central District
- Rural District: Khusf

Population (2006)
  - Total: 16
- Time zone: UTC+3:30 (IRST)
  - Summer (DST): UTC+4:30 (IRDT)

Kalateh-ye Qassab (Persian: كلاته قصاب, also Romanized as Kalāteh-ye Qaşşāb and Kalāteh Qaşşāb; also known as Kalāt-e Qaşşāb) is a village in Khusf Rural District, Central District, Khusf County, South Khorasan Province, Iran. At the 2006 census, its population was 16, in 5 families.
