= Saftuk =

Saftuk سفتوك
- Village
- Location within Iran
- Coordinates: 33°39′41″N 58°59′02″E
- Country: Iran
- Province: South Khorasan
- County: Qaen
- Bakhsh: Central
- Rural District: Qaen

Population (2006)
  - Total: 248
- Time zone: UTC+3:30 (IRST)
  - Summer (DST): UTC+4:30 (IRDT)

Saftuk (Persian: سفتوك, also Romanized as Saftūk; also known as Saftūk-e Pā’īn, Saftūk Pā’īn, and Saftūq) is a village in Qaen Rural District, in the Central District of Qaen County, South Khorasan Province, Iran. At the 2006 census, its population was 248, in 81 families.
