= Kamchah =

Kamchah كم چاه
- Village
- Location within Iran
- Coordinates: 33°00′11″N 59°27′14″E
- Country: Iran
- Province: South Khorasan
- County: Birjand
- Bakhsh: Central
- Rural District: Kahshang

Population (2016)
  - Total: 61
- Time zone: UTC+3:30 (IRST)
  - Summer (DST): UTC+4:30 (IRDT)

Kamchah (Persian: كم چاه, also Romanized as Kamchāh) is a village in Kahshang Rural District, in the Central District of Birjand County, South Khorasan Province, Iran. At the 2016 census, its population was 61, in 20 families.
