= Rojnai =

Rojnai رجنعي
- Village
- Location within Iran
- Coordinates: 32°51′30″N 59°48′10″E
- Country: Iran
- Province: South Khorasan
- County: Darmian
- Bakhsh: Central
- Rural District: Darmian

Population (2006)
  - Total: 36
- Time zone: UTC+3:30 (IRST)
  - Summer (DST): UTC+4:30 (IRDT)

Rojnai (Persian: رجنعي, also Romanized as Rojnaʿī; also known as Rūjneh’ī, Roshanai, Rowshanā’ī, Rowshaneh, and Rowshangān) is a village in Darmian Rural District, in the Central District of Darmian County, South Khorasan Province, Iran. At the 2006 census, its population was 36, in 9 families.
