= Rokhneh =

Rokhneh رخنه
- Village
- Location within Iran
- Coordinates: 31°36′59″N 59°23′59″E
- Country: Iran
- Province: South Khorasan
- County: Nehbandan
- Bakhsh: Central
- Rural District: Meyghan

Population (2006)
  - Total: 106
- Time zone: UTC+3:30 (IRST)
  - Summer (DST): UTC+4:30 (IRDT)

Rokhneh (Persian: رخنه) is a village in Meyghan Rural District, in the Central District of Nehbandan County, South Khorasan Province, Iran. At the 2006 census, its population was 106, in 29 families.
