= Pespatang-e Sofla =

Pespatang-e Sofla پسپتنگ سفلي
- Village
- Location within Iran
- Coordinates: 32°41′32″N 59°23′08″E
- Country: Iran
- Province: South Khorasan
- County: Birjand
- Bakhsh: Central
- Rural District: Baqeran

Population (2006)
  - Total: 10
- Time zone: UTC+3:30 (IRST)
  - Summer (DST): UTC+4:30 (IRDT)

Pespatang-e Sofla (Persian: پسپتنگ سفلي, also Romanized as Pespatang-e Soflá; also known as Pespatang-e Pā’īn, Pas Petang-e Pā’īn, and Posht Tang-e Pā’īn) is a village that is located in Baqeran Rural District, in the Central District of Birjand County of South Khorasan Province, Iran. At the 2006 census, its population was 10, in 4 families.
