= Shir Manj =

Shir Manj شيرمنج/ شيرسنگ /
- Village
- Location within Iran
- Coordinates: 32°47′06″N 59°20′19″E
- Country: Iran
- Province: South Khorasan
- County: Birjand
- Bakhsh: Central
- Rural District: Baqeran

Population (2006)
  - Total: 61
- Time zone: UTC+3:30 (IRST)
  - Summer (DST): UTC+4:30 (IRDT)

Shir Manj (Persian: شيرمنج/ شيرسنگ /, also Romanized as Shīr Manj and Shīr Meng; also known as Shīr Sang, Shīr Meng-e Pā’īn, Shīr Mahanj, and Shīrmeng Pā’īn) is a village in Baqeran Rural District, in the Central District of Birjand County, South Khorasan Province, Iran. At the 2006 census, its population was 61, in 15 families.
