= Estanest =

Estanest استانست
- Village
- Location within Iran
- Coordinates: 32°40′13″N 59°27′20″E
- Country: Iran
- Province: South Khorasan
- County: Sarbisheh
- Bakhsh: Mud
- Rural District: Mud

Population (2006)
  - Total: 101
- Time zone: UTC+3:30 (IRST)
  - Summer (DST): UTC+4:30 (IRDT)

Estanest (Persian: استانست, also Romanized as Estānest and Istānist) is a village in Mud Rural District, Mud District, Sarbisheh County, South Khorasan Province, Iran. According to the 2006 census, it had a population of 101 in 39 families.
