= Rushk, Iran =

Rushk روشك
- Village
- Location within Iran
- Coordinates: 33°38′00″N 59°21′58″E
- Country: Iran
- Province: South Khorasan
- County: Qaen
- Bakhsh: Central
- Rural District: Qaen

Population (2006)
  - Total: 119
- Time zone: UTC+3:30 (IRST)
  - Summer (DST): UTC+4:30 (IRDT)

Rushk (Persian: روشك, also Romanized as Rūshk) is a village in Qaen Rural District, in the Central District of Qaen County, South Khorasan Province, Iran. At the 2006 census, its population was 119, in 36 families. After inspiring from this name and place an Australian citizen named his business Rushk Australia.
