= Murtigh =

Murtigh مورتيغ
- Village
- Location within Iran
- Coordinates: 32°41′10″N 60°18′12″E
- Country: Iran
- Province: South Khorasan
- County: Darmian
- Bakhsh: Gazik
- Rural District: Tabas-e Masina

Population (2006)
  - Total: 204
- Time zone: UTC+3:30 (IRST)
  - Summer (DST): UTC+4:30 (IRDT)

Murtigh (Persian: مورتيغ, also Romanized as Mūrtīgh; also known as Martīgh) is a village in Tabas-e Masina Rural District, Gazik District, Darmian County, South Khorasan Province, Iran. At the 2006 census, its population was 204, in 43 families.
