= Mohebb-e Pain =

Mohebb-e Pain محب پائين
- Village
- Location within Iran
- Coordinates: 33°43′48″N 59°04′23″E
- Country: Iran
- Province: South Khorasan
- County: Qaen
- Bakhsh: Central
- Rural District: Qaen

Population (2006)
  - Total: 24
- Time zone: UTC+3:30 (IRST)
  - Summer (DST): UTC+4:30 (IRDT)

Mohebb-e Pain (Persian: محب پائين, also Romanized as Moḩebb-e Pā’īn; also known as Kalāteh-ye Moḩebb-e Pā’īn) is a village in Qaen Rural District, in the Central District of Qaen County, South Khorasan Province, Iran. At the 2006 census, its population was 24, in 6 families.
