= Tut Kari =

Tut Kari توت كري
- Village
- Location within Iran
- Coordinates: 33°10′18″N 59°46′57″E
- Country: Iran
- Province: South Khorasan
- County: Darmian
- Bakhsh: Qohestan
- Rural District: Qohestan

Population (2006)
  - Total: 53
- Time zone: UTC+3:30 (IRST)
  - Summer (DST): UTC+4:30 (IRDT)

Tut Kari (Persian: توت كري, also Romanized as Tūt Karī; also known as Tūt Khvorī, Tūt-e Khūrī, Tūt-e Kūrī, and Tūt-i-Kuri) is a village in Qohestan Rural District, Qohestan District, Darmian County, South Khorasan Province, Iran. At the 2006 census, its population was 53, in 16 families.
