= Mil Gaz =

Mil Gaz ميلگز
- Village
- Location within Iran
- Coordinates: 31°33′54″N 59°54′58″E
- Country: Iran
- Province: South Khorasan
- County: Nehbandan
- Bakhsh: Central
- Rural District: Neh

Population (2006)
  - Total: 59
- Time zone: UTC+3:30 (IRST)
  - Summer (DST): UTC+4:30 (IRDT)

Mil Gaz (Persian: ميلگز, also Romanized as Mīl Gaz) is a village in Neh Rural District, in the Central District of Nehbandan County, South Khorasan Province, Iran. At the 2006 census, its population was 59, in 15 families.
