= Osghul =

Esghul اصغول
- Village
- Location within Iran
- Coordinates: 32°37′07″N 59°20′05″E
- Country: Iran
- Province: South Khorasan
- County: Sarbisheh
- Bakhsh: Mud
- Rural District: Naharjan

Population (2006)
  - Total: 142
- Time zone: UTC+3:30 (IRST)
  - Summer (DST): UTC+4:30 (IRDT)

Esghul (Persian: اصغول, also Romanized as Oşghūl, Oşqūl, Eşqūl, and Isqūl) is a village in Naharjan Rural District, Mud District, Sarbisheh County, South Khorasan Province, Iran. At the 2006 census, its population was 142, in 59 families.
