= Tangal-e Behdan =

Tangal-e Behdan تنگل بهدان
- Village
- Location within Iran
- Coordinates: 32°44′31″N 59°21′59″E
- Country: Iran
- Province: South Khorasan
- County: Birjand
- Bakhsh: Central
- Rural District: Baqeran

Population (2006)
  - Total: 20
- Time zone: UTC+3:30 (IRST)
  - Summer (DST): UTC+4:30 (IRDT)

Tangal-e Behdan (Persian: تنگل بهدان, also Romanized as Tangal-e Behdān) is a village in Baqeran Rural District, in the Central District of Birjand County, South Khorasan Province, Iran. At the 2006 census, its population was 20, in 10 families.
