= Chajakhu =

Chajakhu چاجاخو
- Village
- Location within Iran
- Coordinates: 32°31′07″N 59°45′39″E
- Country: Iran
- Province: South Khorasan
- County: Sarbisheh
- Bakhsh: Central
- Rural District: Momenabad

Population (2006)
  - Total: 44
- Time zone: UTC+3:30 (IRST)
  - Summer (DST): UTC+4:30 (IRDT)

Chajakhu (Persian: چاجاخو, also Romanized as Chājākhū; also known as Chāchākhū, Chachakhoo, Chā Chā Khow, Chāh Akhur, and Chāh Ākhvor) is a village in Momenabad Rural District, in the Central District of Sarbisheh County, South Khorasan Province, Iran. According to the 2006 census, it had a population of 44 in 14 families.
