= Tal Quch =

Tal Quch تل قوچ
- Village
- Location within Iran
- Coordinates: 32°24′00″N 59°55′00″E
- Country: Iran
- Province: South Khorasan
- County: Sarbisheh
- Bakhsh: Central
- Rural District: Momenabad

Population (2006)
  - Total: 41
- Time zone: UTC+3:30 (IRST)
  - Summer (DST): UTC+4:30 (IRDT)

Tal Quch (Persian: تل قوچ, also Romanized as Tal Qūch and Tall Qūch) is a village in Momenabad Rural District, in the Central District of Sarbisheh County, South Khorasan Province, Iran. At the 2006 census, its population was 41, in 7 families.
