= Tarakani-ye Pain =

Tarakani-ye Pain تركاني پائين
- Village
- Location within Iran
- Coordinates: 32°44′32″N 59°18′46″E
- Country: Iran
- Province: South Khorasan
- County: Birjand
- Bakhsh: Central
- Rural District: Baqeran

Population (2006)
  - Total: 22
- Time zone: UTC+3:30 (IRST)
  - Summer (DST): UTC+4:30 (IRDT)

Tarakani-ye Pain (Persian: تركاني پائين, also Romanized as Tarākānī-ye Pā’īn; also known as Tarākānī-ye Soflá, Tarākānī, Tarkanj, and Tarkūnj) is a village in Baqeran Rural District, in the Central District of Birjand County, South Khorasan Province, Iran. At the 2006 census, its population was 22, in 11 families.
