= Tamand =

Tamand طامند
- Village
- Location within Iran
- Coordinates: 32°30′42″N 59°29′52″E
- Country: Iran
- Province: South Khorasan
- County: Sarbisheh
- Bakhsh: Mud
- Rural District: Naharjan

Population (2006)
  - Total: 49
- Time zone: UTC+3:30 (IRST)
  - Summer (DST): UTC+4:30 (IRDT)

Tamand (Persian: طامند, Romanized as Tāmand, and also known as Tūmand or Towmand) is a village in Naharjan Rural District, Mud District, Sarbisheh County, South Khorasan Province, Iran. According to the 2006 census, its population was 49 people from 18 families.
