= Aliabad-e Farhang =

Village in South Khorasan province, Iran

Aliabad-e Farhang Persian: علي ابادفرهنگ
- Village
- Location within Iran
- Coordinates: 33°9′7″N 59°35′41″E
- Country: Iran
- Province: South Khorasan
- County: Darmian
- District: Qohestan
- Rural District: Kushkak

Population (2016)
  - Total: 16
- Time zone: UTC+3:30 (IRST)

Aliabad-e Farhang (Persian: علي ابادفرهنگ) (Note: Also romanized as ‘Alīābād-e Farhang; also known as Kalāteh-ye Farhang) is a village in Kushkak Rural District of Qohestan District in Darmian County, South Khorasan province, Iran.

== Demographics ==
=== Population ===
At the time of the 2006 National Census, the village's population was 27 in 10 households, when it was in Fakhrrud Rural District of Qohestan District. The following census in 2011 counted 20 people in seven households. The 2016 census measured the population of the village as 16 people in seven households.

In 2021, the rural district was separated from the district in the formation of Miyandasht District, and Aliabad-e Farhang was transferred to Kushkak Rural District created in Qohestan District.
