= Lati, South Khorasan =

Village in South Khorasan province, Iran

Lati Persian: لتي
- Village
- Location within Iran
- Coordinates: 33°08′45″N 59°32′07″E
- Country: Iran
- Province: South Khorasan
- County: Darmian
- District: Qohestan
- Rural District: Kushkak

Population (2016)
  - Total: 66
- Time zone: UTC+3:30 (IRST)

Lati (Persian: لتي) (Note: Also romanized as Latī) is a village in Kushkak Rural District of Qohestan District in Darmian County, South Khorasan province, Iran.

== Demographics ==
=== Population ===
At the time of the 2006 National Census, the village's population was 92 in 22 households, when it was in Fakhrrud Rural District of Qohestan District. The following census in 2011 counted 86 people in 21 households. The 2016 census measured the population of the village as 66 people in 21 households.

In 2021, the rural district was separated from the district in the formation of Miyandasht District, and Lati was transferred to Kushkak Rural District created in Qohestan District.
