= Furkhas =

Village in South Khorasan province, Iran

Furkhas Persian: فورخاص
- Village
- Location within Iran
- Coordinates: 33°05′31″N 59°39′37″E
- Country: Iran
- Province: South Khorasan
- County: Darmian
- District: Qohestan
- Rural District: Kushkak

Population (2016)
  - Total: 273
- Time zone: UTC+3:30 (IRST)

Furkhas (Persian: فورخاص) (Note: Also romanized as Fūrkhāş) is a village in Kushkak Rural District of Qohestan District in Darmian County, South Khorasan province, Iran.

== Demographics ==
=== Population ===
At the time of the 2006 National Census, the village's population was 270 in 73 households, when it was in Fakhrrud Rural District of Qohestan District. The following census in 2011 counted 314 people in 72 households. The 2016 census measured the population of the village as 273 people in 77 households.

In 2021, the rural district was separated from the district in the formation of Miyandasht District, and Furkhas was transferred to Kushkak Rural District created in Qohestan District.
