= Seyyedabad, Kushkak =

Village in South Khorasan province, Iran

Seyyedabad Persian: سيداباد
- Village
- Location within Iran
- Coordinates: 33°09′37″N 59°33′21″E
- Country: Iran
- Province: South Khorasan
- County: Darmian
- District: Qohestan
- Rural District: Kushkak

Population (2016)
  - Total: 197
- Time zone: UTC+3:30 (IRST)

Seyyedabad (Persian: سيداباد) (Note: Also romanized as Seydābād and Seyyedābād; also known as Saiyidābād and Seyyedābād-e Nagnān) is a village in Kushkak Rural District of Qohestan District in Darmian County, South Khorasan province, Iran.

== Demographics ==
=== Population ===
At the time of the 2006 National Census, the village's population was 213 in 57 households, when it was in Fakhrrud Rural District of Qohestan District. The following census in 2011 counted 210 people in 61 households. The 2016 census measured the population of the village as 197 people in 62 households.

In 2021, the rural district was separated from the district in the formation of Miyandasht District, and Seyyedabad was transferred to Kushkak Rural District created in Qohestan District.
