= Khvorshidan =

Village in South Khorasan province, Iran

Khvorshidan Persian: خورشيدان
- Village
- Location within Iran
- Coordinates: 33°05′48″N 59°49′23″E
- Country: Iran
- Province: South Khorasan
- County: Darmian
- District: Qohestan
- Rural District: Kushkak

Population (2016)
  - Total: 51
- Time zone: UTC+3:30 (IRST)

Khvorshidan (Persian: خورشيدان) (Note: Also romanized as Khowrshīdān, Khurshīdān, and Khvorshīdān) is a village in Kushkak Rural District of Qohestan District in Darmian County, South Khorasan province, Iran.

== Demographics ==
=== Population ===
At the time of the 2006 National Census, the village's population was 47 in 13 households, when it was in Fakhrrud Rural District of Qohestan District. The following census in 2011 counted 43 people in 14 households. The 2016 census measured the population of the village as 51 people in 13 households.

In 2021, the rural district was separated from the district in the formation of Miyandasht District, and Khvorshidan was transferred to Kushkak Rural District created in Qohestan District.
