= Gol Afshan Shahr =

Village in South Khorasan province, Iran

Gol Afshan Shahr Persian: گل افشان شهر
- Village
- Location within Iran
- Coordinates: 32°56′29″N 59°54′29″E
- Country: Iran
- Province: South Khorasan
- County: Darmian
- District: Central
- Rural District: Nughab

Population (2016)
  - Total: 85
- Time zone: UTC+3:30 (IRST)

Gol Afshan Shahr (Persian: گل افشان شهر) (Note: Also romanized as Gol Āfshān Shahr) is a village in Nughab Rural District of the Central District in Darmian County, South Khorasan province, Iran.

== Demographics ==
=== Population ===
At the time of the 2006 National Census, the village's population was 46 in 14 households, when it was in Darmian Rural District of the Central District. The following census in 2011 counted 101 people in 18 households. The 2016 census measured the population of the village as 85 people in 27 households, by which time the village had been transferred to Miyandasht Rural District.

In 2021, the rural district was separated from the district in the formation of Miyandasht District, and Gol Afghan Shahr was transferred to Nughab Rural District created in the Central District.
