= Avaz =

Avaz may refer to:

== Given name ==
- Avaz Alakbarov (born 1952), Azerbaijani economist and politician
- Avaz Azmoudeh, Iranian Paralympic athlete
- Avaz Jabiyev (1922–1977), Azerbaijani medical doctor
- Avaz Temirkhan (born 1959), Azerbaijani politician
- Avaz Verdiyev (1916–1945), Soviet-Azerbaijani war hero
- Avaz Zeynalli (1970–2026), Azerbaijani journalist

== Places ==
- Avaz, Iran, a city in Fars Province
- Avaz, Razavi Khorasan, a village in Razavi Khorasan Province, Iran
- Avaz, South Khorasan, a village in South Khorasan Province, Iran

== Other ==
- Avaz (music), unmetered vocal section of a mode in Persian music
- Avaz (album), 2005 rock album by the Turkish band Replikas
- Avaz app, a communication app for children with autism and communication disabilities
- TRT Avaz, a Turkish television channel

== See also ==
- Awaz (disambiguation)
- Avaaz, a global civic organization
- Dnevni avaz, a newspaper in Bosnia and Herzegovina
