= Nughab =

Nughab or Nowghab or Nuqab or Noqab or Naughab or Nooghab or Nuqhab or Nowqab (Persian: نوغاب) may refer to:

- Naughab, Razavi Khorasan, a village in Khalilabad County, Razavi Khorasan Province, Iran
- Nughab, Torbat-e Heydarieh, a village in Torbat-e Heydarieh County, Razavi Khorasan Province, Iran
- Nowghab-e Afzalabad, a village in Birjand County, South Khroasan Province, Iran
- Nughab, Birjand, a village in Birjand County, South Khroasan Province, Iran
- Nughab, Darmian, a village in Darmian County, South Khroasan Province, Iran
- Nughab, Qohestan, a village in Darmian County, South Khroasan Province, Iran
- Nughab, Khusf, a village in Khusf County, South Khroasan Province, Iran
- Nughab-e Hajjiabad, a village in Qaen County, South Khorasan Province, Iran
- Nowghab-e Pas Kuh, a village in Qaen County, South Khorasan Province, Iran
- Nughab, Sarbisheh, a village in Sarbisheh County, South Khroasan Province, Iran
- Nughab Chik, a village in Birjand County, South Khroasan Province, Iran
