= Darreh-ye Abbas, South Khorasan =

Village in South Khorasan province, Iran

Darreh-ye Abbas Persian: دره عباس
- Village
- Location within Iran
- Coordinates: 33°07′14″N 59°38′15″E
- Country: Iran
- Province: South Khorasan
- County: Darmian
- District: Qohestan
- Rural District: Kushkak

Population (2016)
  - Total: 284
- Time zone: UTC+3:30 (IRST)

Darreh-ye Abbas (Persian: دره عباس) (Note: Also romanized as Darreh Abbas, Darreh 'Abbās, and Darreh-ye 'Abbās; also known as Dār-i-'Abbās) is a village in Kushkak Rural District of Qohestan District in Darmian County, South Khorasan province, Iran.

== Demographics ==
=== Population ===
At the time of the 2006 National Census, the village's population was 362 in 110 households, when it was in Fakhrrud Rural District of Qohestan District. The following census in 2011 counted 366 people in 101 households. The 2016 census measured the population of the village as 284 people in 96 households.

In 2021, the rural district was separated from the district in the formation of Miyandasht District, and Darreh-ye Abbas was transferred to Kushkak Rural District created in Qohestan District.
