= Kalateh =

Kalateh (Persian: کلاته) may refer to:

== Golestan Province ==
- Sarkhon Kalateh, a city in Golestan Province, Iran

== Ilam Province ==
- Kalateh, Ilam, a village in Shirvan and Chardaval County

== Kurdistan Province ==
- Kalateh, Kamyaran, a village in Kamyaran County
- Kalateh, Sanandaj, a village in Sanandaj County

== North Khorasan Province ==
- Kalateh-ye Reza, a village in North Khorasan Province, Iran

== Razavi Khorasan Province ==
- Kalateh-ye Reza Khan, a village in Razavi Khorasan Province, Iran
- Kalateh-ye Mazinan, a village in Razavi Khorasan Province, Iran
- Kalateh-ye Tir Kaman, a village in Razavi Khorasan Province, Iran

== Semnan Province ==
- Kalateh Khij, a city in Semnan Province, Iran
- Kalateh Rudbar, a city in Semnan Province, Iran

== South Khorasan Province ==
- Kalateh-ye Now Salmanabad, a village in South Khorasan Province, Iran
- Kalateh-ye Ryisi, a village in South Khorasan Province, Iran
- Kalateh-ye Rezaqoli, a village in Tabas County

== See also ==
- Kalati, Iran (disambiguation)
