= Fazlabad, South Khorasan =

Village in South Khorasan province, Iran

Fazlabad Persian: فضل اباد
- Village
- Location within Iran
- Coordinates: 33°05′08″N 59°40′46″E
- Country: Iran
- Province: South Khorasan
- County: Darmian
- District: Qohestan
- Rural District: Kushkak

Population (2016)
  - Total: 170
- Time zone: UTC+3:30 (IRST)

Fazlabad (Persian: فضل اباد) (Note: Also romanized as Faẕlābād and Fazlābād) is a village in Kushkak Rural District of Qohestan District in Darmian County, South Khorasan province, Iran.

== Demographics ==
=== Population ===
At the time of the 2006 National Census, the village's population was 144 in 44 households, when it was in Fakhrrud Rural District of Qohestan District. The following census in 2011 counted 136 people in 36 households. The 2016 census measured the population of the village as 170 people in 51 households.

In 2021, the rural district was separated from the district in the formation of Miyandasht District, and Fazlabad was transferred to Kushkak Rural District created in Qohestan District.
