= Nakh Ab =

Village in South Khorasan province, Iran

Nakh Ab Persian: نخاب
- Village
- Location within Iran
- Coordinates: 33°06′09″N 59°54′13″E
- Country: Iran
- Province: South Khorasan
- County: Darmian
- District: Miyandasht
- Rural District: Miyandasht

Population (2016)
  - Total: 137
- Time zone: UTC+3:30 (IRST)

Nakh Ab (Persian: نخاب) (Note: Also romanized as Nakh Āb) is a village in Miyandasht Rural District of Miyandasht District in Darmian County, South Khorasan province, Iran.

== Demographics ==
=== Population ===
At the time of the 2006 National Census, the village's population was 124 in 32 households, when it was in the Central District. The following census in 2011 counted 123 people in 34 households. The 2016 census measured the population of the village as 137 people in 36 households.

In 2021, the rural district was separated from the district in the formation of Miyandasht District.
