= Mohammadiyeh, Darmian =

Village in South Khorasan province, Iran

Mohammadiyeh Persian: محمديه
- Village
- Location within Iran
- Coordinates: 33°06′28″N 59°51′41″E
- Country: Iran
- Province: South Khorasan
- County: Darmian
- District: Miyandasht
- Rural District: Miyandasht

Population (2016)
  - Total: 183
- Time zone: UTC+3:30 (IRST)

Mohammadiyeh (Persian: محمديه) (Note: Also romanized as Moḩammadīyeh) is a village in Miyandasht Rural District of Miyandasht District in Darmian County, South Khorasan province, Iran.

== Demographics ==
=== Population ===
At the time of the 2006 National Census, the village's population was 171 in 34 households, when it was in the Central District. The following census in 2011 counted 174 people in 38 households. The 2016 census measured the population of the village as 183 people in 44 households.

In 2021, the rural district was separated from the district in the formation of Miyandasht District.
