= Shamsabad, Darmian =

Village in South Khorasan province, Iran

Shamsabad Persian: شمس اباد
- Village
- Location within Iran
- Coordinates: 33°08′55″N 59°40′43″E
- Country: Iran
- Province: South Khorasan
- County: Darmian
- District: Qohestan
- Rural District: Kushkak

Population (2016)
  - Total: 60
- Time zone: UTC+3:30 (IRST)

Shamsabad (Persian: شمس اباد) (Note: Also romanized as Shamsābād) is a village in Kushkak Rural District of Qohestan District in Darmian County, South Khorasan province, Iran.

== Demographics ==
=== Population ===
At the time of the 2006 National Census, the village's population was 65 in 22 households, when it was in Qohestan Rural District. The following census in 2011 counted 69 people in 22 households. The 2016 census measured the population of the village as 60 people in 21 households.

In 2021, Shamsabad was separated from the rural district in the formation of Kushkak Rural District.
