= Mansurabad, Darmian =

Village in South Khorasan province, Iran

Mansurabad Persian: منصوراباد
- Village
- Location within Iran
- Coordinates: 33°02′55″N 59°39′12″E
- Country: Iran
- Province: South Khorasan
- County: Darmian
- District: Miyandasht
- Rural District: Fakhrrud

Population (2016)
  - Total: 324
- Time zone: UTC+3:30 (IRST)

Mansurabad (Persian: منصوراباد) (Note: Also romanized as Manşūrābād) is a village in Fakhrrud Rural District of Miyandasht District in Darmian County, South Khorasan province, Iran.

== Demographics ==
=== Population ===
At the time of the 2006 National Census, the village's population was 361 in 85 households, when it was in Qohestan District. The following census in 2011 counted 390 people in 100 households. The 2016 census measured the population of the village as 324 people in 86 households.

In 2021, the rural district was separated from the district in the formation of Miyandasht District.
