= Monond-e Bala =

Village in South Khorasan province, Iran

Monond-e Bala Persian: منندبالا
- Village
- Location within Iran
- Coordinates: 33°11′55″N 59°38′31″E
- Country: Iran
- Province: South Khorasan
- County: Darmian
- District: Qohestan
- Rural District: Kushkak

Population (2016)
  - Total: 224
- Time zone: UTC+3:30 (IRST)

Monond-e Bala (Persian: منندبالا) (Note: Also romanized as Monond-e Bālā; also known as Manūn and Monond) is a village in Kushkak Rural District of Qohestan District in Darmian County, South Khorasan province, Iran.

== Demographics ==
=== Population ===
At the time of the 2006 National Census, the village's population was 289 in 87 households, when it was in Qohestan Rural District. The following census in 2011 counted 279 people in 88 households. The 2016 census measured the population of the village as 224 people in 71 households.

In 2021, Monond-e Bala was separated from the rural district in the formation of Kushkak Rural District.
