= Moqdar =

Village in South Khorasan province, Iran

Moqdar Persian: مقدر
- Village
- Location within Iran
- Coordinates: 32°58′11″N 59°44′17″E
- Country: Iran
- Province: South Khorasan
- County: Darmian
- District: Miyandasht
- Rural District: Miyandasht

Population (2016)
  - Total: 71
- Time zone: UTC+3:30 (IRST)

Moqdar (Persian: مقدر) (Note: Also known as Moqaddar, Mūkdār and Nūq Dar) is a village in Miyandasht Rural District of Miyandasht District in Darmian County, South Khorasan province, Iran.

== Demographics ==
=== Population ===
At the time of the 2006 National Census, the village's population was 94 in 35 households, when it was in the Central District. The following census in 2011 counted 60 people in 20 households. The 2016 census measured the population of the village as 71 people in 22 households.

In 2021, the rural district was separated from the district in the formation of Miyandasht District.
