= Kushkak, South Khorasan =

Village in South Khorasan province, Iran

Kushkak Persian: كوشكك
- Village
- Location within Iran
- Coordinates: 33°06′40″N 59°44′08″E
- Country: Iran
- Province: South Khorasan
- County: Darmian
- District: Qohestan
- Rural District: Kushkak

Population (2016)
  - Total: 877
- Time zone: UTC+3:30 (IRST)

Kushkak (Persian: كوشكك) (Note: Also romanized as Kūshkak; also known as Kuckak) is a village in, and the capital of, Kushkak Rural District in Qohestan District of Darmian County, South Khorasan province, Iran.

== Demographics ==
=== Population ===
At the time of the 2006 National Census, the village's population was 867 in 251 households, when it was in Qohestan Rural District. The following census in 2011 counted 858 people in 256 households. The 2016 census measured the population of the village as 877 people in 277 households.

In 2021, Kushkak was separated from the rural district in the formation of Kushkak Rural District.
