= Mah Banu =

Village in South Khorasan province, Iran

Mah Banu Persian: ماه بانو
- Village
- Country: Iran
- Province: South Khorasan
- County: Darmian
- District: Miyandasht
- Rural District: Miyandasht

Population (2016)
  - Total: 18
- Time zone: UTC+3:30 (IRST)

Mah Banu (Persian: ماه بانو) (Note: Also romanized as Māh Bānū) is a village in Miyandasht Rural District of Miyandasht District in Darmian County, South Khorasan province, Iran.

== Demographics ==
=== Population ===
At the time of the 2006 National Census, the village's population was 13 in five households, when it was in the Central District. The following census in 2011 counted 16 people in seven households. The 2016 census measured the population of the village as 18 people in six households.

In 2021, the rural district was separated from the district in the formation of Miyandasht District.
