= Tashvand =

Village in South Khorasan province, Iran

Tashvand Persian: تشوند
- Village
- Location within Iran
- Coordinates: 32°54′53″N 59°51′38″E
- Country: Iran
- Province: South Khorasan
- County: Darmian
- District: Miyandasht
- Rural District: Miyandasht

Population (2016)
  - Total: 88
- Time zone: UTC+3:30 (IRST)

Tashvand (Persian: تشوند) (Note: Also romanized as Tashownd; also known as Tasmān) is a village in Miyandasht Rural District of Miyandasht District in Darmian County, South Khorasan province, Iran.

== Demographics ==
=== Population ===
At the time of the 2006 National Census, the village's population was 116 in 32 households, when it was in the Central District. The following census in 2011 counted 84 people in 25 households. The 2016 census measured the population of the village as 88 people in 32 households.

In 2021, the rural district was separated from the district in the formation of Miyandasht District.
