= Nowzad, Darmian =

Village in South Khorasan province, Iran

Nowzad Persian: نوزاد
- Village
- Location within Iran
- Coordinates: 32°56′42″N 59°47′53″E
- Country: Iran
- Province: South Khorasan
- County: Darmian
- District: Miyandasht
- Rural District: Miyandasht

Population (2016)
  - Total: 519
- Time zone: UTC+3:30 (IRST)

Nowzad (Persian: نوزاد) (Note: Also romanized as Nowzād; also known as Nauzad and Nowzad Mo’men Abad) is a village in Miyandasht Rural District of Miyandasht District in Darmian County, South Khorasan province, Iran.

== Demographics ==
=== Population ===
At the time of the 2006 National Census, the village's population was 889 in 270 households, when it was in the Central District. The following census in 2011 counted 685 people in 235 households. The 2016 census measured the population of the village as 519 people in 189 households.

In 2021, the rural district was separated from the district in the formation of Miyandasht District.
