= Hendevalan =

Village in South Khorasan province, Iran

Hendevalan Persian: هندوالان
- Village
- Location within Iran
- Coordinates: 33°00′59″N 59°53′26″E
- Country: Iran
- Province: South Khorasan
- County: Darmian
- District: Miyandasht
- Rural District: Miyandasht

Population (2016)
  - Total: 1,074
- Time zone: UTC+3:30 (IRST)

Hendevalan (Persian: هندوالان) (Note: Also romanized as Hand Vālān, Hendavālān, and Hendevālān; also known as Hindvālan) is a village in Miyandasht Rural District of Miyandasht District in Darmian County, South Khorasan province, Iran.

== Demographics ==
=== Population ===
At the time of the 2006 National Census, the village's population was 1,005 in 225 households, when it was in the Central District. The following census in 2011 counted 1,141 people in 312 households. The 2016 census measured the population of the village as 1,074 people in 278 households.

In 2021, the rural district was separated from the district in the formation of Miyandasht District.
