= Neginan =

Village in South Khorasan province, Iran

Neginan Persian: نگينان
- Village
- Location within Iran
- Coordinates: 33°11′34″N 59°33′15″E
- Country: Iran
- Province: South Khorasan
- County: Darmian
- District: Qohestan
- Rural District: Kushkak

Population (2016)
  - Total: 345
- Time zone: UTC+3:30 (IRST)

Neginan (Persian: نگينان) (Note: Also romanized as Negīnān; also known as Nagīnu) is a village in Kushkak Rural District of Qohestan District in Darmian County, South Khorasan province, Iran.

== Demographics ==
=== Population ===
At the time of the 2006 National Census, the village's population was 354 in 114 households, when it was in Fakhrrud Rural District of Qohestan District. The following census in 2011 counted 335 people in 108 households. The 2016 census measured the population of the village as 345 people in 109 households.

In 2021, the rural district was separated from the district in the formation of Miyandasht District, and Neginan was transferred to Kushkak Rural District created in Qohestan District.
