= Mehdiabad, Darmian =

Village in South Khorasan province, Iran

Mehdiabad Persian: مهدي اباد
- Village
- Location within Iran
- Coordinates: 33°03′35″N 59°48′42″E
- Country: Iran
- Province: South Khorasan
- County: Darmian
- District: Miyandasht
- Rural District: Miyandasht

Population (2016)
  - Total: 103
- Time zone: UTC+3:30 (IRST)

Mehdiabad (Persian: مهدي اباد) (Note: Also romanized as Mehdīābād) is a village in Miyandasht Rural District of Miyandasht District in Darmian County, South Khorasan province, Iran.

== Demographics ==
=== Population ===
At the time of the 2006 National Census, the village's population was 74 in 17 households, when it was in the Central District. The following census in 2011 counted 98 people in 28 households. The 2016 census measured the population of the village as 103 people in 26 households.

In 2021, the rural district was separated from the district in the formation of Miyandasht District.
