= Avishk =

Village in South Khorasan province, Iran

Avishk Persian: اويشك
- Village
- Location within Iran
- Coordinates: 33°10′43″N 59°37′19″E
- Country: Iran
- Province: South Khorasan
- County: Darmian
- District: Qohestan
- Rural District: Kushkak

Population (2016)
  - Total: 138
- Time zone: UTC+3:30 (IRST)

Avishk (Persian: اويشك) (Note: Also romanized as Āvīshk and Evīshk; also known as Evick) is a village in Kushkak Rural District of Qohestan District in Darmian County, South Khorasan province, Iran.

== Demographics ==
=== Population ===
At the time of the 2006 National Census, the village's population was 109 in 30 households, when it was in Qohestan Rural District. The following census in 2011 counted 118 people in 32 households. The 2016 census measured the population of the village as 138 people in 35 households.

In 2021, Avishk was separated from the rural district in the formation of Kushkak Rural District.
