= Khalaf, South Khorasan =

Village in South Khorasan province, Iran

Khalaf Persian: خلف
- Village
- Location within Iran
- Coordinates: 33°08′34″N 59°52′54″E
- Country: Iran
- Province: South Khorasan
- County: Darmian
- District: Miyandasht
- Rural District: Miyandasht

Population (2016)
  - Total: 332
- Time zone: UTC+3:30 (IRST)

Khalaf (Persian: خلف) is a village in Miyandasht Rural District of Miyandasht District in Darmian County, South Khorasan province, Iran.

== Demographics ==
=== Population ===
At the time of the 2006 National Census, the village's population was 387 in 105 households, when it was in the Central District. The following census in 2011 counted 386 people in 112 households. The 2016 census measured the population of the village as 332 people in 103 households.

In 2021, the rural district was separated from the district in the formation of Miyandasht District.
