= Bidesk-e Monond =

Village in South Khorasan province, Iran

Bidesk-e Monond Persian: بيدسك منند
- Village
- Location within Iran
- Coordinates: 33°11′41″N 59°36′31″E
- Country: Iran
- Province: South Khorasan
- County: Darmian
- District: Qohestan
- Rural District: Kushkak

Population (2016)
  - Total: 42
- Time zone: UTC+3:30 (IRST)

Bidesk-e Monond (Persian: بيدسك منند) (Note: Also romanized as Bīdesk-e Monond; also known as Bedesk, Bedestk, Bīdesg, and Bīdesk)) is a village in Kushkak Rural District of Qohestan District in Darmian County, South Khorasan province, Iran.

== Demographics ==
=== Population ===
At the time of the 2006 National Census, the village's population was 86 in 37 households, when it was in Qohestan Rural District. The following census in 2011 counted 45 people in 21 households. The 2016 census measured the population of the village as 42 people in 20 households.

In 2021, Bidesk-e Monond was separated from the rural district in the formation of Kushkak Rural District.
