= Asadiyeh, Miyandasht =

Village in South Khorasan province, Iran

Asadiyeh Persian: اسديه
- Village
- Country: Iran
- Province: South Khorasan
- County: Darmian
- District: Miyandasht
- Rural District: Miyandasht

Population (2016)
  - Total: 16
- Time zone: UTC+3:30 (IRST)

Asadiyeh (Persian: اسديه) (Note: Also romanized as Āsadīyeh) is a village in Miyandasht Rural District of Miyandasht District in Darmian County, South Khorasan province, Iran.

== Demographics ==
=== Population ===
At the time of the 2006 National Census, the village's population was 53 in 15 households, when it was in the Central District. The following census in 2011 counted 26 people in eight households. The 2016 census measured the population of the village as 16 people in six households.

In 2021, the rural district was separated from the district in the formation of Miyandasht District.
