= Amidabad (disambiguation) =

Amidabad is a village in Zanjan Province, Iran.

Amidabad (Persian: عميداباد) may also refer to:

- Amidabad-e Olya, South Khorasan Province
- Amidabad-e Qazi, South Khorasan Province
- Amidabad-e Sofla, South Khorasan Province
