= Qasemabad, Darmian =

Village in South Khorasan province, Iran

Qasemabad Persian: قاسم اباد
- Village
- Location within Iran
- Country: Iran
- Province: South Khorasan
- County: Darmian
- District: Miyandasht
- Rural District: Miyandasht

Population (2016)
  - Total: 31
- Time zone: UTC+3:30 (IRST)

Qasemabad (Persian: قاسم اباد) (Note: Also romanized as Qāsemābād; also known as Ghasem Abad Mo’men Abad, Kalāteh-ye Qāsemābād, and Qāsimābād) is a village in Miyandasht Rural District of Miyandasht District in Darmian County, South Khorasan province, Iran.

== Demographics ==
=== Population ===
At the time of the 2006 National Census, the village's population was 38 in eight households, when it was in the Central District. The following census in 2011 counted 38 people in 12 households. The 2016 census measured the population of the village as 31 people in seven households.

In 2021, the rural district was separated from the district in the formation of Miyandasht District.
