= Mask, South Khorasan =

Village in South Khorasan province, Iran

Mask Persian: مسك
- Village
- Location within Iran
- Coordinates: 32°58′16″N 59°42′51″E
- Country: Iran
- Province: South Khorasan
- County: Darmian
- District: Miyandasht
- Rural District: Miyandasht

Population (2016)
  - Total: 375
- Time zone: UTC+3:30 (IRST)

Mask (Persian: مسك) (Note: Also known as Māzk) is a village in Miyandasht Rural District of Miyandasht District in Darmian County, South Khorasan province, Iran.

== Demographics ==
=== Population ===
At the time of the 2006 National Census, the village's population was 423 in 142 households, when it was in the Central District. The following census in 2011 counted 430 people in 140 households. The 2016 census measured the population of the village as 375 people in 139 households.

In 2021, the rural district was separated from the district in the formation of Miyandasht District.
