= Komachi, Iran =

Village in South Khorasan province, Iran

Komachi Persian: كماچي
- Village
- Location within Iran
- Coordinates: 33°10′20″N 59°39′38″E
- Country: Iran
- Province: South Khorasan
- County: Darmian
- District: Qohestan
- Rural District: Kushkak

Population (2016)
  - Total: 89
- Time zone: UTC+3:30 (IRST)

Komachi (Persian: كماچي) (Note: Also romanized as Komāchī) is a village in Kushkak Rural District of Qohestan District in Darmian County, South Khorasan province, Iran.

== Demographics ==
=== Population ===
At the time of the 2006 National Census, the village's population was 110 in 24 households, when it was in Qohestan Rural District. The following census in 2011 counted 94 people in 31 households. The 2016 census measured the population of the village as 89 people in 34 households.

In 2021, Komachi was separated from the rural district in the formation of Kushkak Rural District.
