= Serijan =

Village in South Khorasan province, Iran

Serijan Persian: سريجان
- Village
- Location within Iran
- Coordinates: 33°09′08″N 59°36′50″E
- Country: Iran
- Province: South Khorasan
- County: Darmian
- District: Qohestan
- Rural District: Kushkak

Population (2016)
  - Total: 89
- Time zone: UTC+3:30 (IRST)

Serijan (Persian: سريجان) (Note: Also romanized as Serījān; also known as Sar-i-Jub and Sīrjān) is a village in Kushkak Rural District of Qohestan District in Darmian County, South Khorasan province, Iran.

== Demographics ==
=== Population ===
At the time of the 2006 National Census, the village's population was 138 in 34 households, when it was in Qohestan Rural District. The following census in 2011 counted 110 people in 27 households. The 2016 census measured the population of the village as 89 people in 22 households.

In 2021, Serijan was separated from the rural district in the formation of Kushkak Rural District.
