= Asfich =

Village in South Khorasan province, Iran

Asfich Persian: اسفيچ
- Village
- Location within Iran
- Coordinates: 33°02′34″N 59°38′26″E
- Country: Iran
- Province: South Khorasan
- County: Darmian
- District: Miyandasht
- Rural District: Fakhrrud

Population (2016)
  - Total: 368
- Time zone: UTC+3:30 (IRST)

Asfich (Persian: اسفيچ) (Note: Also romanized as Āsfīch; also known as Esfīj) is a village in Fakhrrud Rural District of Miyandasht District in Darmian County, South Khorasan province, Iran.

== Demographics ==
=== Population ===
At the time of the 2006 National Census, the village's population was 334 in 101 households, when it was in Qohestan District. The following census in 2011 counted 319 people in 100 households. The 2016 census measured the population of the village as 368 people in 114 households.

In 2021, the rural district was separated from the district in the formation of Miyandasht District.
