= Zargaz =

Village in South Khorasan province, Iran

Zargaz Persian: زارگز
- Village
- Location within Iran
- Coordinates: 32°58′44″N 59°41′32″E
- Country: Iran
- Province: South Khorasan
- County: Darmian
- District: Miyandasht
- Rural District: Fakhrrud

Population (2016)
  - Total: 513
- Time zone: UTC+3:30 (IRST)

Zargaz (Persian: زارگز) (Note: Also romanized as Zārgaz; also known as Kalāteh Zangaz and Sar Gaz) is a village in Fakhrrud Rural District of Miyandasht District in Darmian County, South Khorasan province, Iran.

== Demographics ==
=== Population ===
At the time of the 2006 National Census, the village's population was 500 in 128 households, when it was in Qohestan District. The following census in 2011 counted 512 people in 140 households. The 2016 census measured the population of the village as 513 people in 140 households.

In 2021, the rural district was separated from the district in the formation of Miyandasht District.
