= Abdoleh =

Village in South Khorasan province, Iran

Abdoleh Persian: عبدله
- Village
- Location within Iran
- Coordinates: 33°05′52″N 59°35′34″E
- Country: Iran
- Province: South Khorasan
- County: Darmian
- District: Miyandasht
- Rural District: Fakhrrud

Population (2016)
  - Total: 60
- Time zone: UTC+3:30 (IRST)

Abdoleh (Persian: عبدله) (Note: Also romanized as ‘Abdoleh and ‘Abdollāh; also known as Abdolī and ‘Abdullah) is a village in Fakhrrud Rural District of Miyandasht District in Darmian County, South Khorasan province, Iran.

== Demographics ==
=== Population ===
At the time of the 2006 National Census, the village's population was 65 in 21 households, when it was in Qohestan District. The following census in 2011 counted 59 people in 20 households. The 2016 census measured the population of the village as 60 people in 21 households.

In 2021, the rural district was separated from the district in the formation of Miyandasht District.
