= Sar Khong =

Sar Khong سرخنگ
- Village
- Location within Iran
- Coordinates: 33°11′09″N 59°42′08″E
- Country: Iran
- Province: South Khorasan
- County: Darmian
- Bakhsh: Qohestan
- Rural District: Qohestan

Population (2006)
  - Total: 91
- Time zone: UTC+3:30 (IRST)
  - Summer (DST): UTC+4:30 (IRDT)

Sar Khong (Persian: سرخنگ, also Romanized as Sar-e Khong, Sar-i-Khung, Sar Khank, and Sar Khonak; also known as Bāgh-e Sar Khonak) is a village in Qohestan Rural District, Qohestan District, Darmian County, South Khorasan Province, Iran. At the 2006 census, its population was 91, in 43 families.
