= Pir Zanuk =

Village in South Khorasan province, Iran

Pir Zanuk Persian: پيرزنوك
- Village
- Location within Iran
- Coordinates: 33°07′04″N 59°34′09″E
- Country: Iran
- Province: South Khorasan
- County: Darmian
- District: Miyandasht
- Rural District: Fakhrrud

Population (2016)
  - Total: 67
- Time zone: UTC+3:30 (IRST)

Pir Zanuk (Persian: پيرزنوك) (Note: Also romanized as Pīr Zanūk and Pīrzenūk; also known as Bīrzanūk) is a village in Fakhrrud Rural District of Miyandasht District in Darmian County, South Khorasan province, Iran.

== Demographics ==
=== Population ===
At the time of the 2006 National Census, the village's population was 89 in 28 households, when it was in Qohestan District. The following census in 2011 counted 56 people in 16 households. The 2016 census measured the population of the village as 67 people in 20 households.

In 2021, the rural district was separated from the district in the formation of Miyandasht District.
