= Fizik =

Village in South Khorasan province, Iran

Fizik Persian: فيزيك
- Village
- Location within Iran
- Coordinates: 32°58′53″N 59°40′03″E
- Country: Iran
- Province: South Khorasan
- County: Darmian
- District: Miyandasht
- Rural District: Fakhrrud

Population (2016)
  - Total: 102
- Time zone: UTC+3:30 (IRST)

Fizik (Persian: فيزيك) (Note: Also romanized as Fīzīk; also known as Fezīk and Fīzak) is a village in Fakhrrud Rural District of Miyandasht District in Darmian County, South Khorasan province, Iran.

== Demographics ==
=== Population ===
At the time of the 2006 National Census, the village's population was 172 in 46 households, when it was in Qohestan District. The following census in 2011 counted 142 people in 42 households. The 2016 census measured the population of the village as 102 people in 34 households.

In 2021, the rural district was separated from the district in the formation of Miyandasht District.
