= Darreh Charm =

Village in South Khorasan province, Iran

Darreh Charm Persian: دره چرم
- Village
- Location within Iran
- Coordinates: 33°07′25″N 59°54′11″E
- Country: Iran
- Province: South Khorasan
- County: Darmian
- District: Miyandasht
- Rural District: Miyandasht

Population (2016)
  - Total: 496
- Time zone: UTC+3:30 (IRST)

Darreh Charm (Persian: دره چرم) (Note: Also romanized as Darreh-ye Charm; also known as Dar-i-Charm) is a village in Miyandasht Rural District of Miyandasht District in Darmian County, South Khorasan province, Iran.

== Demographics ==
=== Population ===
At the time of the 2006 National Census, the village's population was 581 in 123 households, when it was in the Central District. The following census in 2011 counted 543 people in 144 households. The 2016 census measured the population of the village as 496 people in 119 households.

In 2021, the rural district was separated from the district in the formation of Miyandasht District.
