= Seyyedan, Darmian =

Village in South Khorasan province, Iran

Seyyedan Persian: سيدان
- Village
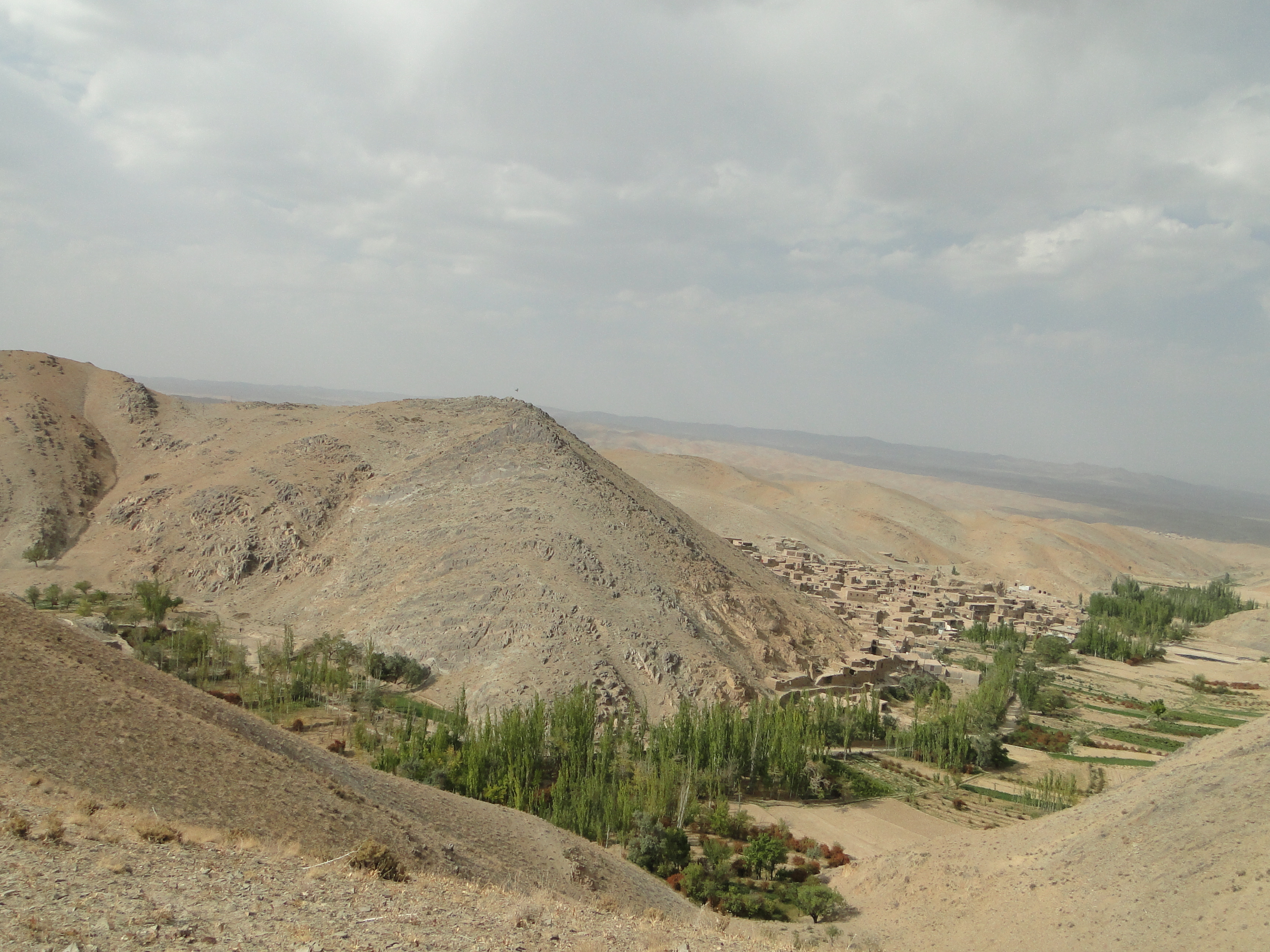
- The village of Seyyedan

- Location within Iran
- Coordinates: 33°01′04″N 59°37′17″E
- Country: Iran
- Province: South Khorasan
- County: Darmian
- District: Miyandasht
- Rural District: Fakhrrud

Population (2016)
  - Total: 324
- Time zone: UTC+3:30 (IRST)

Seyyedan (Persian: سيدان) (Note: Also romanized as Seyyedān; also known as Saiyidādān, Sendādān, Seyyed Dān, and Seyyedādān) is a village in Fakhrrud Rural District of Miyandasht District in Darmian County, South Khorasan province, Iran.

== Demographics ==
=== Population ===
At the time of the 2006 National Census, the village's population was 412 in 101 households, when it was in Qohestan District. The following census in 2011 counted 365 people in 96 households. The 2016 census measured the population of the village as 324 people in 97 households.

In 2021, the rural district was separated from the district in the formation of Miyandasht District.
