= Tangal =

Village in South Khorasan province, Iran

Tangal Persian: تنگل
- Village
- Location within Iran
- Coordinates: 33°08′02″N 59°40′03″E
- Country: Iran
- Province: South Khorasan
- County: Darmian
- District: Qohestan
- Rural District: Kushkak

Population (2016)
  - Total: 133
- Time zone: UTC+3:30 (IRST)

Tangal (Persian: تنگل) (Note: Also known as Tang-e Yāl and Tangyāl) is a village in Kushkak Rural District of Qohestan District in Darmian County, South Khorasan province, Iran.

== Demographics ==
=== Population ===
At the time of the 2006 National Census, the village's population was 164 in 39 households, when it was in Qohestan Rural District. The following census in 2011 counted 155 people in 38 households. The 2016 census measured the population of the village as 133 people in 35 households.

In 2021, Tangal was separated from the rural district in the formation of Kushkak Rural District.
