= Khosrowabad, Darmian =

Village in South Khorasan province, Iran

Khosrowabad Persian: خسرواباد
- Village
- Location within Iran
- Coordinates: 33°04′50″N 59°43′54″E
- Country: Iran
- Province: South Khorasan
- County: Darmian
- District: Qohestan
- Rural District: Kushkak

Population (2016)
  - Total: 460
- Time zone: UTC+3:30 (IRST)

Khosrowabad (Persian: خسرواباد) (Note: Also romanized as Khosrowābād; also known as Khosrābād and Khusrābād) is a village in Kushkak Rural District of Qohestan District in Darmian County, South Khorasan province, Iran.

== Demographics ==
=== Population ===
At the time of the 2006 National Census, the village's population was 431 in 135 households, when it was in Fakhrrud Rural District of Qohestan District. The following census in 2011 counted 461 people in 129 households. The 2016 census measured the population of the village as 460 people in 130 households.

In 2021, the rural district was separated from the district in the formation of Miyandasht District, and Khosrowabad was transferred to Kushkak Rural District created in Qohestan District.
