= Avijan =

Village in South Khorasan province, Iran

Avijan Persian: اويجان
- Village
- Location within Iran
- Coordinates: 33°00′20″N 59°39′36″E
- Country: Iran
- Province: South Khorasan
- County: Darmian
- District: Miyandasht
- Rural District: Fakhrrud

Population (2016)
  - Total: 185
- Time zone: UTC+3:30 (IRST)

Avijan (Persian: اويجان) (Note: Also romanized as Āvījān; also known as Āb Jūb) is a village in Fakhrrud Rural District of Miyandasht District in Darmian County, South Khorasan province, Iran.

== Demographics ==
=== Population ===
At the time of the 2006 National Census, the village's population was 194 in 50 households, when it was in Qohestan District. The following census in 2011 counted 162 people in 42 households. The 2016 census measured the population of the village as 185 people in 53 households.

In 2021, the rural district was separated from the district in the formation of Miyandasht District.
