= Reza, Iran =

Reza (Persian: رضا) may refer to:

- Reza, Khuzestan
- Reza, South Khorasan

== See also ==
- Deh Reza (disambiguation)
