= Gaz, Darmian =

Village in South Khorasan province, Iran

Gaz Persian: گز
- Village
- Location within Iran
- Coordinates: 33°10′12″N 59°39′36″E
- Country: Iran
- Province: South Khorasan
- County: Darmian
- District: Qohestan
- Rural District: Kushkak

Population (2016)
  - Total: 9
- Time zone: UTC+3:30 (IRST)

Gaz (Persian: گز) is a village in Kushkak Rural District of Qohestan District in Darmian County, South Khorasan province, Iran.

== Demographics ==
=== Population ===
At the time of the 2006 National Census, the village's population was 11 in seven households, when it was in Qohestan Rural District. The following census in 2011 counted 11 people in seven households. The 2016 census measured the population of the village as nine people in four households.

In 2021, Gaz was separated from the rural district in the formation of Kushkak Rural District.
