= Chak, South Khorasan =

Village in South Khorasan province, Iran

Chak Persian: چک
- Village
- Location within Iran
- Coordinates: 32°56′15″N 59°48′51″E
- Country: Iran
- Province: South Khorasan
- County: Darmian
- District: Miyandasht
- Rural District: Miyandasht

Population (2016)
  - Total: 197
- Time zone: UTC+3:30 (IRST)

Chak (Persian: چک) (Note: Also known as Chīk) is a village in Miyandasht Rural District of Miyandasht District in Darmian County, South Khorasan province, Iran.

== Demographics ==
=== Population ===
At the time of the 2006 National Census, the village's population was 223 in 55 households, when it was in the Central District. The following census in 2011 counted 201 people in 64 households. The 2016 census measured the population of the village as 197 people in 66 households.

In 2021, the rural district was separated from the district in the formation of Miyandasht District.
