= Rejnuk =

Village in South Khorasan province, Iran

Rejnuk Persian: رجنوك
- Village
- Location within Iran
- Country: Iran
- Province: South Khorasan
- County: Darmian
- District: Qohestan
- Rural District: Kushkak

Population (2016)
  - Total: 117
- Time zone: UTC+3:30 (IRST)

Rejnuk (Persian: رجنوك) (Note: Also romanized as Rajonūk and Rejnūk) is a village in Kushkak Rural District of Qohestan District in Darmian County, South Khorasan province, Iran.

== Demographics ==
=== Population ===
At the time of the 2006 National Census, the village's population was 146 in 46 households, when it was in Qohestan Rural District. The following census in 2011 counted 145 people in 46 households. The 2016 census measured the population of the village as 117 people in 38 households.

In 2021, Rejnuk was separated from the rural district in the formation of Kushkak Rural District.
