= Khunik-e Baz =

Village in South Khorasan province, Iran

Khunik-e Baz Persian: خونيك باز
- Village
- Location within Iran
- Coordinates: 32°57′25″N 59°46′50″E
- Country: Iran
- Province: South Khorasan
- County: Darmian
- District: Miyandasht
- Rural District: Miyandasht

Population (2016)
  - Total: 83
- Time zone: UTC+3:30 (IRST)

Khunik-e Baz (Persian: خونيك باز) (Note: Also romanized as Khūnīk-e Bāz; also known as Khank Bāz, Khonik Baz, and Khūnīk Bās) is a village in Miyandasht Rural District of Miyandasht District in Darmian County, South Khorasan province, Iran.

== Demographics ==
=== Population ===
At the time of the 2006 National Census, the village's population was 87 in 21 households, when it was in the Central District. The following census in 2011 counted 79 people in 24 households. The 2016 census measured the population of the village as 83 people in 29 households.

In 2021, the rural district was separated from the district in the formation of Miyandasht District.
