= Aliabad-e Fakhrud =

Village in South Khorasan province, Iran

Aliabad-e Fakhrud Persian: علي ابادفخرود
- Village
- Location within Iran
- Coordinates: 33°5′11″N 59°35′57″E
- Country: Iran
- Province: South Khorasan
- County: Darmian
- District: Miyandasht
- Rural District: Fakhrrud

Population (2016)
  - Total: 31
- Time zone: UTC+3:30 (IRST)

Aliabad-e Fakhrud (Persian: علي ابادفخرود) (Note: Also romanized as ‘Alīābād-e Fakhrūd; also known as ‘Alīābād) is a village in Fakhrrud Rural District of Miyandasht District in Darmian County, South Khorasan province, Iran.

== Demographics ==
=== Population ===
At the time of the 2006 National Census, the village's population was 75 in 21 households, when it was in Qohestan District. The following census in 2011 counted 43 people in 13 households. The 2016 census measured the population of the village as 31 people in 11 households.

In 2021, the rural district was separated from the district in the formation of Miyandasht District.
