= Bonyab =

Village in South Khorasan province, Iran

Bonyab Persian: بنياب
- Village
- Location within Iran
- Coordinates: 32°52′27″N 59°54′52″E
- Country: Iran
- Province: South Khorasan
- County: Darmian
- District: Central
- Rural District: Nughab

Population (2016)
  - Total: 211
- Time zone: UTC+3:30 (IRST)

Bonyab (Persian: بنياب) (Note: Also romanized as Bonyāb; also known as Bonīābād, Buniāb, and Buniah) is a village in Nughab Rural District of the Central District in Darmian County, South Khorasan province, Iran.

== Demographics ==
=== Population ===
At the time of the 2006 National Census, the village's population was 189 in 46 households, when it was in Darmian Rural District of the Central District. The following census in 2011 counted 186 people in 47 households. The 2016 census measured the population of the village as 211 people in 53 households.

In 2021, Bonyab was separated from the rural district in the creation of Nughab Rural District.
