= Sehk =

Village in South Khorasan province, Iran

Sehk Persian: سهك
- Village
- Location within Iran
- Coordinates: 33°04′05″N 59°34′45″E
- Country: Iran
- Province: South Khorasan
- County: Darmian
- District: Miyandasht
- Rural District: Fakhrrud

Population (2016)
  - Total: 75
- Time zone: UTC+3:30 (IRST)

Sehk (Persian: سهك) (Note: Also romanized as Sahk; also known as Sek, Sekh, and Sīk) is a village in Fakhrrud Rural District of Miyandasht District in Darmian County, South Khorasan province, Iran.

== Demographics ==
=== Population ===
At the time of the 2006 National Census, the village's population was 122 in 36 households, when it was in Qohestan District. The following census in 2011 counted 71 people in 27 households. The 2016 census measured the population of the village as 75 people in 27 households.

In 2021, the rural district was separated from the district in the formation of Miyandasht District.
