= Mahmudabad, Darmian =

Village in South Khorasan province, Iran

Mahmudabad Persian: محموداباد
- Village
- Location within Iran
- Coordinates: 32°56′23″N 59°58′41″E
- Country: Iran
- Province: South Khorasan
- County: Darmian
- District: Central
- Rural District: Nughab

Population (2016)
  - Total: 105
- Time zone: UTC+3:30 (IRST)

Mahmudabad (Persian: محموداباد) (Note: Also romanized as Maḥmūdābād; also known as Khar Mīrī and Maḥmūdābād-e Kharmīrī) is a village in Nughab Rural District of the Central District in Darmian County, South Khorasan province, Iran.

== Demographics ==
=== Population ===
At the time of the 2006 National Census, the village's population was 62 in 14 households, when it was in Darmian Rural District of the Central District. The following census in 2011 counted 37 people in 10 households. The 2016 census measured the population of the village as 105 people in 18 households.

In 2021, Mahmudabad was separated from the rural district in the creation of Nughab Rural District.
