= Arreh Furg =

Village in South Khorasan province, Iran

Arreh Furg Persian: اره فورگ
- Village
- Location within Iran
- Coordinates: 32°51′07″N 59°57′57″E
- Country: Iran
- Province: South Khorasan
- County: Darmian
- District: Central
- Rural District: Nughab

Population (2016)
  - Total: 201
- Time zone: UTC+3:30 (IRST)

Arreh Furg (Persian: اره فورگ) (Note: Also romanized as Arreh Fūrg; also known as Arfūrk and Arreh) is a village in Nughab Rural District of the Central District in Darmian County, South Khorasan province, Iran.

== Demographics ==
=== Population ===
At the time of the 2006 National Census, the village's population was 148 in 35 households, when it was in Darmian Rural District of the Central District. The following census in 2011 counted 161 people in 39 households. The 2016 census measured the population of the village as 201 people in 57 households.

In 2021, Arreh Furg was separated from the rural district in the creation of Nughab Rural District.
