= Feyzabad, Darmian =

Village in South Khorasan province, Iran

Feyzabad Persian: فيض اباد
- Village
- Location within Iran
- Coordinates: 32°45′56″N 60°12′01″E
- Country: Iran
- Province: South Khorasan
- County: Darmian
- District: Gazik
- Rural District: Tabas-e Masina

Population (2016)
  - Total: 329
- Time zone: UTC+3:30 (IRST)

Feyzabad (Persian: فيض اباد) (Note: Also romanized as Feyẕābād and Feyzābād; also known as Faizābād) is a village in Tabas-e Masina Rural District of Gazik District in Darmian County, South Khorasan province, Iran.

== Demographics ==
=== Population ===
At the time of the 2006 National Census, the village's population was 434 in 89 households. The following census in 2011 counted 356 people in 87 households. The 2016 census measured the population of the village as 329 people in 76 households.
