= Daftabad-e Olya =

Village in South Khorasan province, Iran

Daftabad-e Olya Persian: دفت ابادعليا
- Village
- Location within Iran
- Coordinates: 32°49′10″N 59°58′46″E
- Country: Iran
- Province: South Khorasan
- County: Darmian
- District: Central
- Rural District: Nughab

Population (2016)
  - Total: 63
- Time zone: UTC+3:30 (IRST)

Daftabad-e Olya (Persian: دفت ابادعليا) (Note: Also romanized as Daftābād-e 'Olyā; also known as Daftābād-e Bālā and Raftābād) is a village in Nughab Rural District of the Central District in Darmian County, South Khorasan province, Iran.

== Demographics ==
=== Population ===
At the time of the 2006 National Census, the village's population was 70 in 15 households, when it was in Darmian Rural District of the Central District. The following census in 2011 counted 51 people in 14 households. The 2016 census measured the population of the village as 63 people in 17 households.

In 2021, Daftabad-e Olya was separated from the rural district in the creation of Nughab Rural District.
