= Qaleh Now, South Khorasan =

Village in South Khorasan province, Iran

Qaleh Now Persian: قلعه نو
- Village
- Location within Iran
- Coordinates: 32°55′01″N 60°16′20″E
- Country: Iran
- Province: South Khorasan
- County: Darmian
- District: Gazik
- Rural District: Gazik

Population (2016)
  - Total: 54
- Time zone: UTC+3:30 (IRST)

Qaleh Now (Persian: قلعه نو) (Note: Also romanized as Qal‘eh Now and Qal‘eh-ye Now; also known as Ghal‘eh Now and Qalah Nau) is a village in Gazik Rural District of Gazik District in Darmian County, South Khorasan province, Iran.

== Demographics ==
=== Population ===
At the time of the 2006 National Census, the village's population was 29 in six households. The following census in 2011 counted 21 people in five households. The 2016 census measured the population of the village as 54 people in 15 households.
