= Kalateh-ye Now Salmanabad =

Kalateh-ye Now Salmanabad كلاته نوسلمان اباد
- village
- Location within Iran
- Coordinates: 32°45′06″N 60°11′18″E
- Country: Iran
- Province: South Khorasan
- County: Darmian
- Bakhsh: Gazik
- Rural District: Tabas-e Masina

Population (2006)
  - Total: 32
- Time zone: UTC+3:30 (IRST)
  - Summer (DST): UTC+4:30 (IRDT)

Kalateh-ye Now Salmanabad (Persian: كلاته نوسلمان اباد, also Romanized as Kalāteh-ye Now Salmānābād; also known as Kalāteh) is a village in Tabas-e Masina Rural District, Gazik District, Darmian County, South Khorasan Province, Iran. At the 2006 census, its population was 32, in 8 families.
