= Sarab-e Sofla =

Village in South Khorasan province, Iran

Sarab-e Sofla Persian: سراب سفلي
- Village
- Location within Iran
- Coordinates: 33°14′09″N 59°57′45″E
- Country: Iran
- Province: South Khorasan
- County: Darmian
- District: Qohestan
- Rural District: Qohestan

Population (2016)
  - Total: 271
- Time zone: UTC+3:30 (IRST)

Sarab-e Sofla (Persian: سراب سفلي) (Note: Also romanized as Sarāb-e Soflá) is a village in Qohestan Rural District of Qohestan District in Darmian County, South Khorasan province, Iran.

== Demographics ==
=== Population ===
At the time of the 2006 National Census, the village's population was 276 in 87 households. The following census in 2011 counted 320 people in 88 households. The 2016 census measured the population of the village as 271 people in 86 households.
