= Dastgerd, Darmian =

Village in South Khorasan province, Iran

Dastgerd Persian: دستگرد
- Village
- Location within Iran
- Coordinates: 32°43′04″N 60°12′50″E
- Country: Iran
- Province: South Khorasan
- County: Darmian
- District: Gazik
- Rural District: Tabas-e Masina

Population (2016)
  - Total: 1,262
- Time zone: UTC+3:30 (IRST)

Dastgerd (Persian: دستگرد) (Note: Also known as Dastgird and Dastjirdūn) is a village in Tabas-e Masina Rural District of Gazik District in Darmian County, South Khorasan province, Iran.

== Demographics ==
=== Population ===
At the time of the 2006 National Census, the village's population was 1,179 in 262 households. The following census in 2011 counted 1,149 people in 298 households. The 2016 census measured the population of the village as 1,262 people in 332 households. It was the most populous village in its rural district.
