= Khuniksar =

Village in South Khorasan province, Iran

Khuniksar Persian: خونيكسار
- Village
- Location within Iran
- Coordinates: 33°12′09″N 59°58′41″E
- Country: Iran
- Province: South Khorasan
- County: Darmian
- District: Qohestan
- Rural District: Qohestan

Population (2016)
  - Total: 1,118
- Time zone: UTC+3:30 (IRST)

Khuniksar (Persian: خونيكسار) (Note: Also romanized as Khūnīḵsār) is a village in Qohestan Rural District of Qohestan District in Darmian County, South Khorasan province, Iran.

== Demographics ==
=== Population ===
At the time of the 2006 National Census, the village's population was 943 in 236 households. The following census in 2011 counted 981 people in 256 households. The 2016 census measured the population of the village as 1,118 people in 280 households, the most populous village in its rural district.
