= Khvan =

Village in South Khorasan province, Iran

Khvan Persian: خوان
- Village
- Location within Iran
- Coordinates: 33°15′27″N 59°42′50″E
- Country: Iran
- Province: South Khorasan
- County: Darmian
- District: Qohestan
- Rural District: Qohestan

Population (2016)
  - Total: 333
- Time zone: UTC+3:30 (IRST)

Khvan (Persian: خوان) (Note: Also romanized as Khvān; also known as Khūy and Kūh) is a village in Qohestan Rural District of Qohestan District in Darmian County, South Khorasan province, Iran.

== Demographics ==
=== Population ===
At the time of the 2006 National Census, the village's population was 375 in 126 households. The following census in 2011 counted 429 people in 140 households. The 2016 census measured the population of the village as 333 people in 114 households.
