= Zekri, Iran =

Zekri ذكري
- Village
- Location within Iran
- Coordinates: 32°38′18″N 60°16′17″E
- Country: Iran
- Province: South Khorasan
- County: Darmian
- Bakhsh: Gazik
- Rural District: Tabas-e Masina

Population (2006)
  - Total: 87
- Time zone: UTC+3:30 (IRST)
  - Summer (DST): UTC+4:30 (IRDT)

Zekri (Persian: ذكري, also Romanized as Z̄ekrī; also known as Kalāteh Z̄ekrī) is a village in Tabas-e Masina Rural District, Gazik District, Darmian County, South Khorasan Province, Iran. At the 2006 census, its population was 87, in 17 families.
