= Zir Barandud =

Village in South Khorasan province, Iran

Zir Barandud Persian: زيربراندود
- Village
- Location within Iran
- Coordinates: 33°11′23″N 59°46′58″E
- Country: Iran
- Province: South Khorasan
- County: Darmian
- District: Qohestan
- Rural District: Qohestan

Population (2016)
  - Total: 265
- Time zone: UTC+3:30 (IRST)

Zir Barandud (Persian: زيربراندود) (Note: Also romanized as Zīr Barandūd, Zīr-e Barandūd, and Zīr-i-Barandūd; also known as Barandūd, Zīr Banāndūd, and Zīrandūd) is a village in Qohestan Rural District of Qohestan District in Darmian County, South Khorasan province, Iran.

== Demographics ==
=== Population ===
At the time of the 2006 National Census, the village's population was 244 in 66 households. The following census in 2011 counted 221 people in 59 households. The 2016 census measured the population of the village as 265 people in 80 households.
