= Zaliran =

Village in South Khorasan province, Iran

Zaliran Persian: زليران
- Village
- Location within Iran
- Country: Iran
- Province: South Khorasan
- County: Darmian
- District: Central
- Rural District: Nughab

Population (2016)
  - Total: 19
- Time zone: UTC+3:30 (IRST)

Zaliran (Persian: زليران) (Note: Also romanized as Zalīrān; also known as Zalerān and Zūlīrān) is a village in Nughab Rural District of the Central District in Darmian County, South Khorasan province, Iran.

== Demographics ==
=== Population ===
At the time of the 2006 National Census, the village's population was 24 in 11 households, when it was in Darmian Rural District of the Central District. The following census in 2011 counted 20 people in six households. The 2016 census measured the population of the village as 19 people in nine households.

In 2021, Zaliran was separated from the rural district in the creation of Nughab Rural District.
