= Rud-e Robat =

Village in South Khorasan province, Iran

Rud-e Robat Persian: رودرباط
- Village
- Location within Iran
- Coordinates: 33°13′03″N 60°08′21″E
- Country: Iran
- Province: South Khorasan
- County: Darmian
- District: Central
- Rural District: Nughab

Population (2016)
  - Total: 53
- Time zone: UTC+3:30 (IRST)

Rud-e Robat (Persian: رودرباط) (Note: Also romanized as Rūd-e Robāţ; also known as Robāţ) is a village in Nughab Rural District of the Central District in Darmian County, South Khorasan province, Iran.

== Demographics ==
=== Population ===
At the time of the 2006 National Census, the village's population was 69 in 21 households, when it was in Darmian Rural District of the Central District. The following census in 2011 counted 53 people in 17 households. The 2016 census measured the population of the village as 53 people in 16 households.

In 2021, Rud-e Robat was separated from the rural district in the creation of Nughab Rural District.
