= Git, Iran =

Village in South Khorasan province, Iran

Git Persian: گيت
- Village
- Location within Iran
- Coordinates: 33°16′08″N 59°59′17″E
- Country: Iran
- Province: South Khorasan
- County: Darmian
- District: Qohestan
- Rural District: Qohestan

Population (2016)
  - Total: 395
- Time zone: UTC+3:30 (IRST)

Git (Persian: گيت) (Note: Also romanized as Gīt) is a village in Qohestan Rural District of Qohestan District in Darmian County, South Khorasan province, Iran.

== Demographics ==
=== Population ===
At the time of the 2006 National Census, the village's population was 457 in 130 households. The following census in 2011 counted 391 people in 124 households. The 2016 census measured the population of the village as 395 people in 120 households.
