= Takhteh-ye Jan =

Village in South Khorasan province, Iran

Takhteh-ye Jan Persian: تخته جان
- Village
- Location within Iran
- Coordinates: 33°13′21″N 60°00′04″E
- Country: Iran
- Province: South Khorasan
- County: Darmian
- District: Qohestan
- Rural District: Qohestan

Population (2016)
  - Total: 770
- Time zone: UTC+3:30 (IRST)

Takhteh-ye Jan (Persian: تخته جان) (Note: Also romanized as Takhte Jan, Takhteh Jan, and Takhteh-ye Jān) is a village in Qohestan Rural District of Qohestan District in Darmian County, South Khorasan province, Iran.

== Demographics ==
=== Population ===
At the time of the 2006 National Census, the village's population was 830 in 265 households. The following census in 2011 counted 865 people in 268 households. The 2016 census measured the population of the village as 770 people in 244 households.
