= Barandud =

Village in South Khorasan province, Iran

Barandud Persian: براندود
- Village
- Location within Iran
- Coordinates: 33°12′42″N 59°45′54″E
- Country: Iran
- Province: South Khorasan
- County: Darmian
- District: Qohestan
- Rural District: Qohestan

Population (2016)
  - Total: 274
- Time zone: UTC+3:30 (IRST)

Barandud (Persian: براندود) (Note: Also romanized as Barandūd) is a village in Qohestan Rural District of Qohestan District in Darmian County, South Khorasan province, Iran.

== Demographics ==
=== Population ===
At the time of the 2006 National Census, the village's population was 296 in 80 households. The following census in 2011 counted 271 people in 82 households. The 2016 census measured the population of the village as 274 people in 86 households.
