= Nughab, Darmian =

Village in South Khorasan province, Iran

Nughab Persian: نوغاب
- Village
- Location within Iran
- Coordinates: 32°58′53″N 59°55′15″E
- Country: Iran
- Province: South Khorasan
- County: Darmian
- District: Central
- Rural District: Nughab

Population (2016)
  - Total: 3,520
- Time zone: UTC+3:30 (IRST)

Nughab (Persian: نوغاب) (Note: Also romanized as Naughāb, Nooghab, Nowghāb, and Nūghāb; also known as Nowqāb and Nūqāb) is a village in, and the capital of, Nughab Rural District in the Central District of Darmian County, South Khorasan province, Iran.

== Demographics ==
=== Population ===
At the time of the 2006 National Census, the village's population was 3,198 in 742 households, when it was in Miyandasht Rural District of the Central District. The following census in 2011 counted 3,342 people in 851 households. The 2016 census measured the population of the village as 3,520 people in 927 households.

In 2021, the rural district was separated from the district in the formation of Miyandasht District, and Nughab was transferred to Nughab Rural District created in the Central District.
