= Zeydan, South Khorasan =

Village in South Khorasan province, Iran

Zeydan Persian: زيدان
- Village
- Location within Iran
- Coordinates: 33°12′05″N 60°09′23″E
- Country: Iran
- Province: South Khorasan
- County: Darmian
- District: Central
- Rural District: Nughab

Population (2016)
  - Total: 348
- Time zone: UTC+3:30 (IRST)

Zeydan (Persian: زيدان) (Note: Also romanized as Zeydān) is a village in Nughab Rural District of the Central District in Darmian County, South Khorasan province, Iran.

== Demographics ==
=== Population ===
At the time of the 2006 National Census, the village's population was 283 in 76 households, when it was in Darmian Rural District of the Central District. The following census in 2011 counted 291 people in 84 households. The 2016 census measured the population of the village as 348 people in 95 households.

In 2021, Zeydan was separated from the rural district in the creation of Nughab Rural District.
