= Aliabad, Darmian =

Village in South Khorasan province, Iran

Aliabad Persian: علي اباد
- Village
- Location within Iran
- Coordinates: 32°46′35″N 60°13′50″E
- Country: Iran
- Province: South Khorasan
- County: Darmian
- District: Gazik
- Rural District: Tabas-e Masina

Population (2016)
  - Total: 393
- Time zone: UTC+3:30 (IRST)

Aliabad (Persian: علي اباد) (Note: Also romanized as ‘Alīābād) is a village in Tabas-e Masina Rural District of Gazik District in Darmian County, South Khorasan province, Iran.

== Demographics ==
=== Population ===
At the time of the 2006 National Census, the village's population was 515 in 116 households. The following census in 2011 counted 436 people in 97 households. The 2016 census measured the population of the village as 393 people in 90 households.
