= Mahsnan =

Mahsnan ماه سنان
- Village
- Location within Iran
- Coordinates: 33°16′09″N 59°42′28″E
- Country: Iran
- Province: South Khorasan
- County: Darmian
- Bakhsh: Qohestan
- Rural District: Qohestan

Population (2006)
  - Total: 151
- Time zone: UTC+3:30 (IRST)
  - Summer (DST): UTC+4:30 (IRDT)

Mahsnan (Persian: ماه سنان, also Romanized as Māhsnān; also known as Māsnān, Māsenān, Māsinu, and Māsīnū) is a village in Qohestan Rural District, Qohestan District, Darmian County, South Khorasan Province, Iran. At the 2006 census, its population was 151, in 44 families.
