= Shirk =

Shirk may refer to:

- Shirk (surname)
- Shirk (Islam), in Islam, the sin of idolatry or worshiping beings or things other than God ('attributing an associate (to God)')
- Shirk, Iran, a village in South Khorasan Province, Iran
- Shirk-e Sorjeh, a village in South Khorasan Province, Iran
- "Shirk break", a synonym for coffee break
- Shirking model, part of the economic principle of the efficiency wage
- USS Shirk (DD-318), a United States Navy destroyer in service 1921 to 1930

== See also ==
- Shirag, a village in Birjand County, South Khorasan Province, Iran
