= Furg =

Furg may refer to:

- Furg, Darmian, a village in Darmian County, South Khorasan Province, Iran
  - Furg citadel, a 12th-century citadel
- Fur Jan, also known as Furg, a village in Birjand County, South Khorasan Province, Iran

FURG may refer to:

- Fundação Universidade Federal do Rio Grande, a public Brazilian university funded by the Brazilian federal government, located in the city of Rio Grande, Rio Grande do Sul

== See also ==
- Fourg, a commune in France
