= Nughab, Qohestan =

Nughab نوغاب
- Village
- Location within Iran
- Coordinates: 33°19′21″N 59°41′32″E
- Country: Iran
- Province: South Khorasan
- County: Darmian
- Bakhsh: Qohestan
- Rural District: Qohestan

Population (2006)
  - Total: 313
- Time zone: UTC+3:30 (IRST)
  - Summer (DST): UTC+4:30 (IRDT)

Nughab (Persian: نوغاب, also Romanized as Nūghāb; also known as Nūgau and Nūgow) is a village in Qohestan Rural District, Qohestan District, Darmian County, South Khorasan Province, Iran. At the 2006 census, its population was 313, in 80 families.
