= Gask, Iran =

Village in South Khorasan province, Iran

Gask Persian: گسك
- Village
- Location within Iran
- Coordinates: 33°02′19″N 59°42′16″E
- Country: Iran
- Province: South Khorasan
- County: Darmian
- District: Miyandasht
- Rural District: Fakhrrud

Population (2016)
  - Total: 581
- Time zone: UTC+3:30 (IRST)

Gask (Persian: گسك) (Note: Also known as Gāsg and Gesg) is a village in, and the capital of, Fakhrrud Rural District in Miyandasht District of Darmian County, South Khorasan province, Iran.

== Demographics ==
=== Population ===
At the time of the 2006 National Census, the village's population was 565 in 174 households, when it was in Qohestan District. The following census in 2011 counted 613 people in 192 households. The 2016 census measured the population of the village as 581 people in 190 households, the most populous village in its rural district.

In 2021, the rural district was separated from the district in the formation of Miyandasht District.
