= Mohammadabad, Darmian =

Village in South Khorasan province, Iran

Mohammadabad Persian: محمداباد
- Village
- Location within Iran
- Coordinates: 32°45′48″N 60°13′15″E
- Country: Iran
- Province: South Khorasan
- County: Darmian
- District: Gazik
- Rural District: Tabas-e Masina

Population (2016)
  - Total: 710
- Time zone: UTC+3:30 (IRST)

Mohammadabad (Persian: محمداباد) (Note: Also romanized as Moḩammadābād; also known as Muhammadābād) is a village in Tabas-e Masina Rural District of Gazik District in Darmian County, South Khorasan province, Iran.

== Demographics ==
=== Population ===
At the time of the 2006 National Census, the village's population was 788 in 148 households. The following census in 2011 counted 657 people in 142 households. The 2016 census measured the population of the village as 710 people in 150 households.
