= Kalateh-ye Gavich =

Village in South Khorasan province, Iran

Kalateh-ye Gavich Persian: كلاته گاويچ
- Village
- Location within Iran
- Coordinates: 32°51′48″N 60°21′02″E
- Country: Iran
- Province: South Khorasan
- County: Darmian
- District: Gazik
- Rural District: Gazik

Population (2016)
  - Total: 143
- Time zone: UTC+3:30 (IRST)

Kalateh-ye Gavich (Persian: كلاته گاويچ) (Note: Also romanized as Kalāteh-ye Gāvīch) is a village in Gazik Rural District of Gazik District in Darmian County, South Khorasan province, Iran.

== Demographics ==
=== Population ===
At the time of the 2006 National Census, the village's population was 96 in 25 households. The following census in 2011 counted 81 people in 21 households. The 2016 census measured the population of the village as 143 people in 37 households.
