= Zekri (disambiguation) =

Zekri may refer to:

== Places ==
- Zekri, town in Algeria
- Zekri, Iran, town in Iran

== People ==
- Zekri (surname)
