= Bureng =

Village in South Khorasan province, Iran

Bureng Persian: بورنگ
- Village
- Location within Iran
- Coordinates: 33°00′55″N 59°45′07″E
- Country: Iran
- Province: South Khorasan
- County: Darmian
- District: Miyandasht
- Rural District: Miyandasht

Population (2016)
  - Total: 2,276
- Time zone: UTC+3:30 (IRST)

Bureng (Persian: بورنگ) (Note: Also romanized as Baurang, Būrang, and Būreng) is a village in Miyandasht Rural District of Miyandasht District in Darmian County, South Khorasan province, Iran, serving as capital of both the district and the rural district.

== Demographics ==
=== Population ===
At the time of the 2006 National Census, the village's population was 2,099 in 474 households, when it was in the Central District. The following census in 2011 counted 2,772 people in 747 households. The 2016 census measured the population of the village as 2,276 people in 687 households.

In 2021, the rural district was separated from the district in the formation of Miyandasht District.
