= Shirk, Iran =

Village in South Khorasan province, Iran

Shirk Persian: شيرك
- Village
- Location within Iran
- Coordinates: 33°06′41″N 59°30′28″E
- Country: Iran
- Province: South Khorasan
- County: Darmian
- District: Miyandasht
- Rural District: Fakhrrud

Population (2016)
  - Total: 390
- Time zone: UTC+3:30 (IRST)

Shirk (Persian: شیرک) (Note: Also romanized as Shīrk; also known as Shīrag and Shīrg (شیرگ)) is a village in Fakhrrud Rural District of Miyandasht District in Darmian County, South Khorasan province, Iran.

== Demographics ==
=== Population ===
At the time of the 2006 National Census, the village's population was 617 in 161 households, when it was in Qohestan District. The following census in 2011 counted 469 people in 140 households. The 2016 census measured the population of the village as 390 people in 126 households.

In 2021, the rural district was separated from the district in the formation of Miyandasht District.
