= Taghan =

Village in South Khorasan province, Iran

Taghan Persian: تاغان
- Village
- Location within Iran
- Coordinates: 32°55′03″N 60°02′58″E
- Country: Iran
- Province: South Khorasan
- County: Darmian
- District: Central
- Rural District: Nughab

Population (2016)
  - Total: 988
- Time zone: UTC+3:30 (IRST)

Taghan (Persian: تاغان) (Note: Also romanized as Ţāghān; also known as Ţāqān) is a village in Nughab Rural District of the Central District in Darmian County, South Khorasan province, Iran.

== Demographics ==
=== Population ===
At the time of the 2006 National Census, the village's population was 941 in 179 households, when it was in Darmian Rural District of the Central District. The following census in 2011 counted 905 people in 214 households. The 2016 census measured the population of the village as 988 people in 246 households.

In 2021, Taghan was separated from the rural district in the creation of Nughab Rural District.
