= Ahmadabad, Darmian =

Village in South Khorasan province, Iran

Ahmadabad Persian: احمداباد
- Village
- Location within Iran
- Coordinates: 32°46′13″N 60°11′13″E
- Country: Iran
- Province: South Khorasan
- County: Darmian
- District: Gazik
- Rural District: Tabas-e Masina

Population (2016)
  - Total: 582
- Time zone: UTC+3:30 (IRST)

Ahmadabad (Persian: احمداباد) (Note: Also romanized as Aḩmadābād) is a village in Tabas-e Masina Rural District of Gazik District in Darmian County, South Khorasan province, Iran.

== Demographics ==
=== Population ===
At the time of the 2006 National Census, the village's population was 664 in 119 households. The following census in 2011 counted 651 people in 139 households. The 2016 census measured the population of the village as 582 people in 141 households.
