= Furg Citadel =

18th-century castle in Iran

Forg Castle (Mirza Rafi Khan Castle)
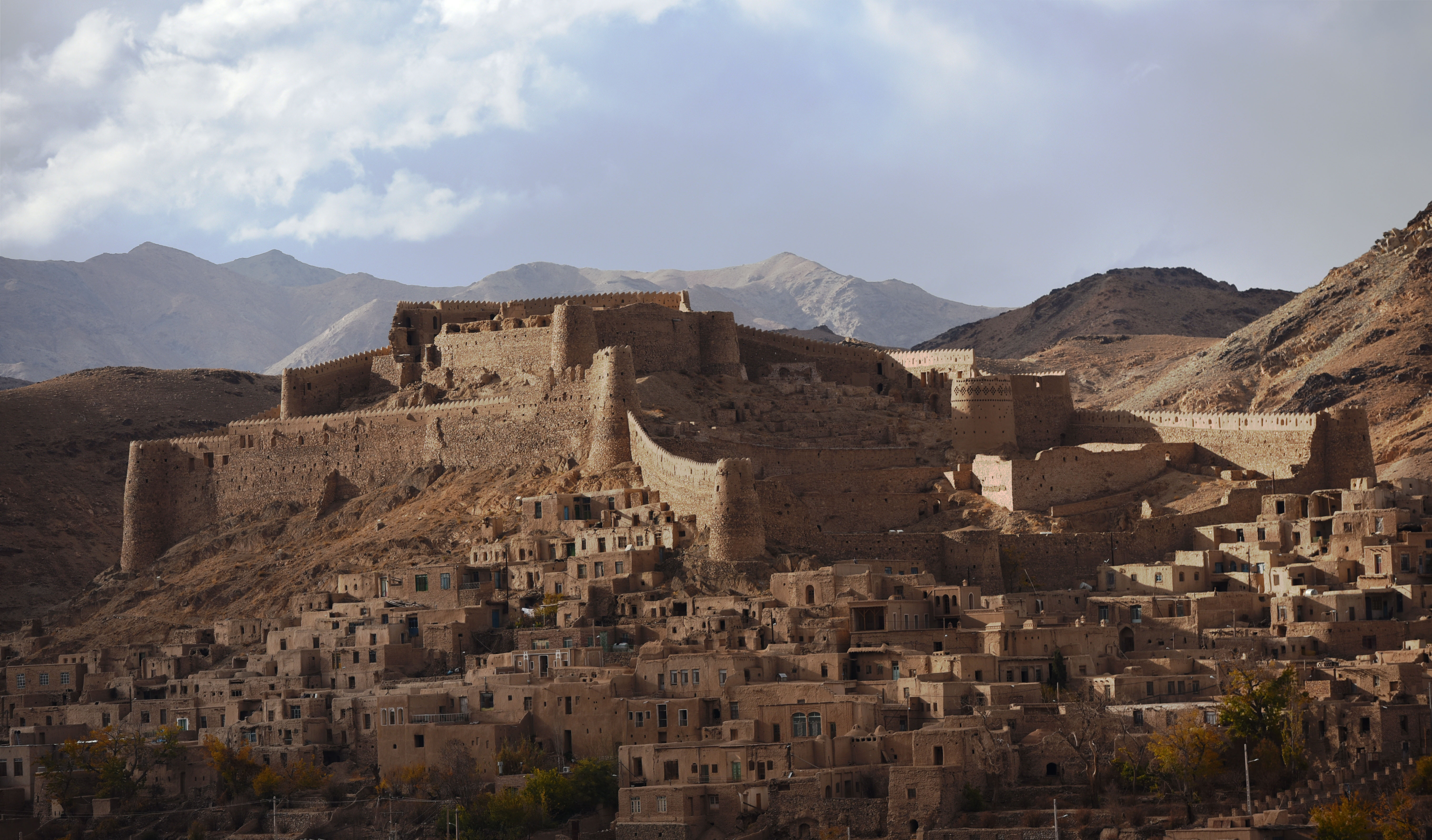
- Forg Castle (Mirza Rafi Khan Castle)

- Location within Iran
- 32°50′41″N 59°56′55″E
- Type: Settlement
- Periods: Afsharid era
- Location: Darmian, Iran
- Region: South Khorasan province

Site notes
- Owner: Mixed public and private
- Public access: Partial

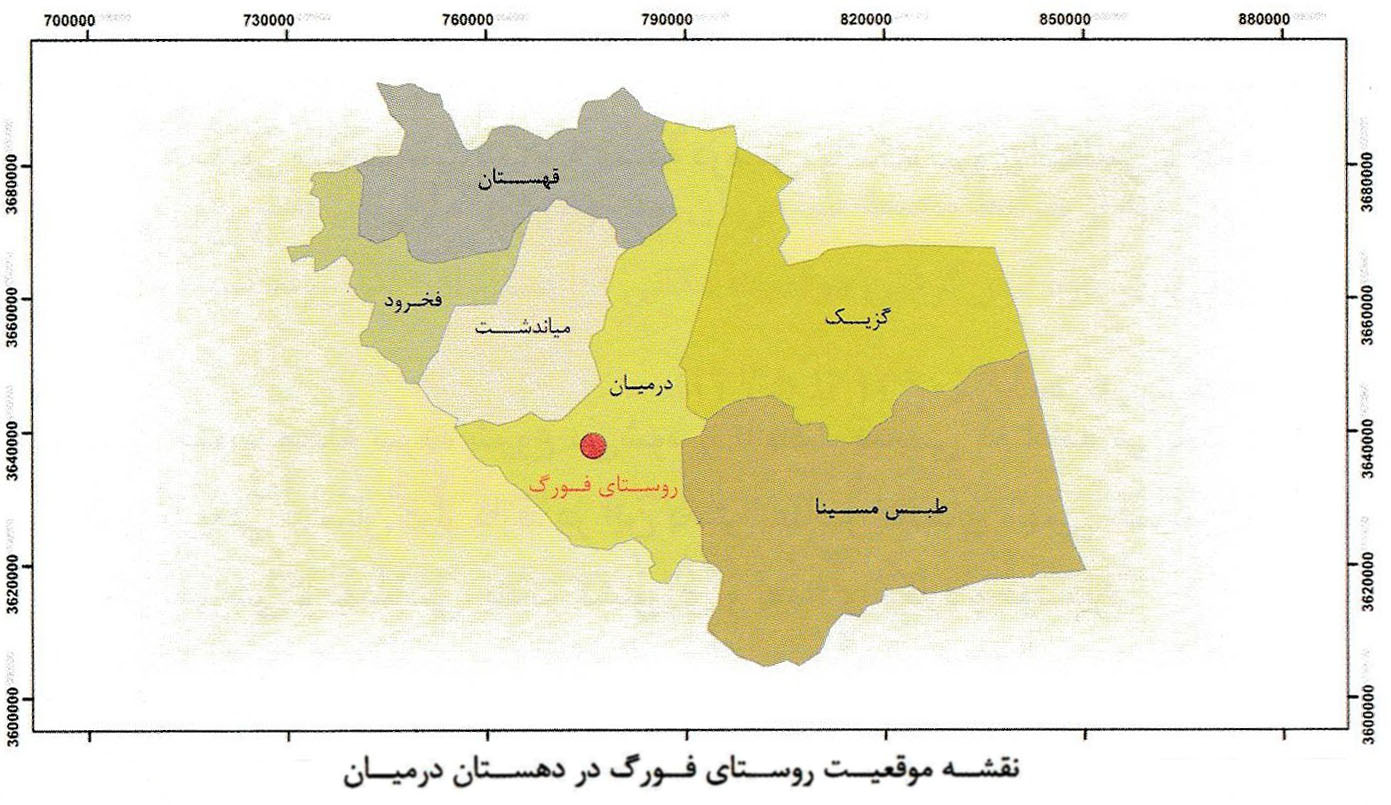
Forg citadel within Darmian County

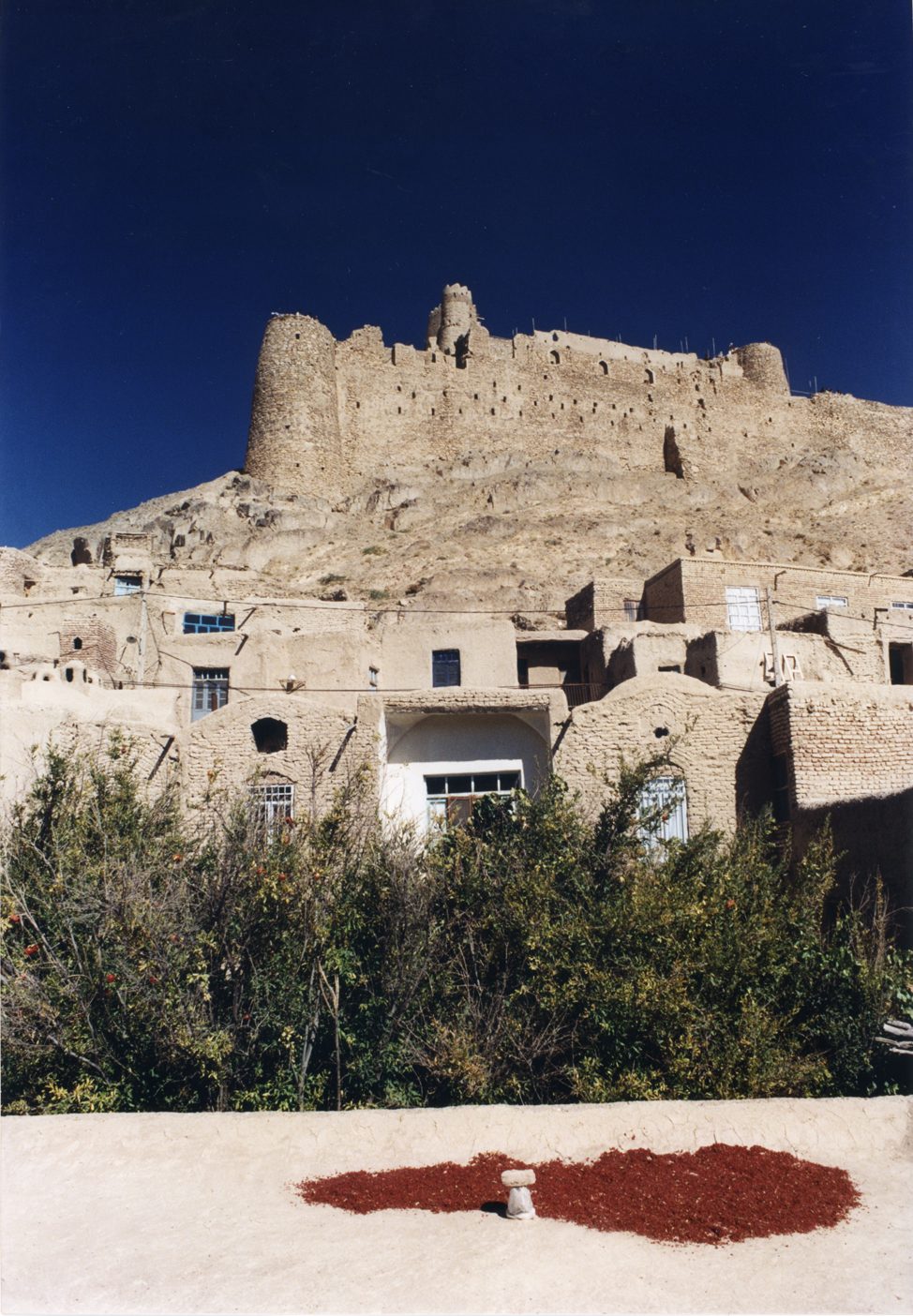
Furg Citadel

Furg Citadel (Persian: ارگ فورگ, romanized: Arg-e Furg), also known as Forg citadel and Mirza Rafi Khan citadel, is an 18th-century citadel located in Furg Village in Darmian County, South Khorasan province, Iran.

Furg Citadel was constructed by Meerza Muhammad Rafiee Darmiany I (Lama). It was registered in the List of National Works on 18 March 2001.

== Name ==
There are different origin stories for the name of Forg/Furg. One of the more common is that Forg was commonly pronounced "Fork" among the people. The Dehkhoda Dictionary, in a quote from the Encyclopedia, explicitly mentions that "Fork" was the name of the ancestor of a family in Iran, and is an Iranian name.

Other versions suggest that Fork was the name of the daughter of "Ryan Konouj", an Indian king; that Fork was the wife of Bahram Gour (as stated in Borhan); and/or that perhaps the name stems from the Persian word pour, meaning "son". Still other theories attribute Fork to the founder of this village, i.e. Mozafar Keyghobad, and based on an inscription on which the year of 307 is written, they infer that as the founder of this village was initially "Pour Keyghobad", it was first called "Pourg", and then renamed to Fork and then to Forg over time.

== Location ==
Furg Citadel is located on the north side of Fork Village at an altitude of 1840 meters. It is on the edge of the heights of Darmian Valley, leading to the Asadiyeh plain. Furg Citadel covers about 9,200 square meters, extending from east to west.

== Description ==
The citadel today has three major sections

=== Section 1 ===
Section 1 of the citadel contains a barn on the east side that served as living quarters for the staff, as a cattle barn and as a dock warehouse.

This section also includes a citadel entrance, guard towers, water storage and other spaces.

=== Section 2 ===
Section 2 is a tall central area that is 50 meters from the storage areas, armory and barracks. The citadel has a brick tower with cruciform or lozenge design decorations in the northeast corner.

=== Section 3 ===
Section 3 encompasses two floors overlooking the village and roads of the area. It is located in the west and is separated from section 2 by two towers and fortified and long walls. Most of the second floor has been destroyed.

=== Tunnel ===
The tunnel has approximately 100 usable stairs.

The current tunnel was allegedly used during the battle between Mirza Rafi Khan with Mir Alam Khan and his son Amir Asadollah Khan. This battle is referred to in Einolvaghaye

"… Esmaeil Khan, Atakhan, and their families obeyed and followed; and Afghans with Mirza Rafi Khan, Haji Fathkhan Afghan and Behboud son of Nazarkhan Ghalehgahi erected a burrow on one side of the citadel and escaped at night".

However, given the length of time needed to bore a tunnel, the author might be referring to an earlier structure.

== History ==
=== Construction ===
Based on the existing documents, the Book of Divan-e-Lame and local comments, construction of the Furg Citadel began in early 1160 AH, during the reign of Nader Shah Afshar, by Mirza Bagha Khan, son of the First Mirza Rafi Khan. The citadel was completed by his son, the Second Mirza Rafi Khan.

However, the Divan-e-Lame also says:

"But, was it really started the building of the citadel by Mirza Bagha Khan and completed by his son, Mirza Rafi Khan (Lame's grandson) or is it one of the old buildings and these two persons and the former ones, everyone has had a hand in it and made effort to repair and complete it, is something that has not been achieved yet; not based on the written documents and not through oral promise of the elders.

It is likely that Lame and his father had possessed the citadel and it was their place of residence and administration center and shelter. The Book of Haghayeghol Akhbr Naseri, discusses the events of the lunar year of 1268 about Mirza Rafi Khan:

"In the same year, Mirza Rafi Khan, who was staying in Ghaenat places, started to oppose, General Pashakhan with two legions from city of Semnan and a collective of cavalry and forty cannons were also assigned to punish him. Mirza Rafi Khan went to Harat. Zahiroddoleh interceded for him, and his crime was pardoned."

=== Qajar era ===
An inscription carved on the mortar surface of the water storage of the citadel indicates the lunar date of 1217.

Riazi Heravi writes in Einolvaghayeh Book as follows:

"Forg citadel is 12 miles away from Birjand and locates around plain and entrance of "Darmian" valley and has a lot of gardens and trees and enjoys a good climate, the citadel is on the top of a mountain of which walls and towers have been firmly constructed by mud bricks and its foundation was made by Ajin stone and has two Haji Shir around itself and two embankments each of which diameter is five cubits.

=== European visitors ===
Furg Citadel was described by a "Doctor Forbes" in 1814 AD, a "Colonel MacGerger" in 1875, and a "Khanykf" and "Blue". MacGerger cited Forbes in his itinerary titled "A Journey to the Province of Khorasan" as follows:

"The citadel has been built on the top of a hill at an altitude of 2000 to 2500 feet which could be threatened by the fire load from the highlands of the north and west. A mountain is located in the south and on the other two sides which is away 1200 yards from the peak to the walls of the citadel. Three water storages were provided inside the citadel which is said that the storage of their water will supply the utility of a great garrison for the period of one year and six months.

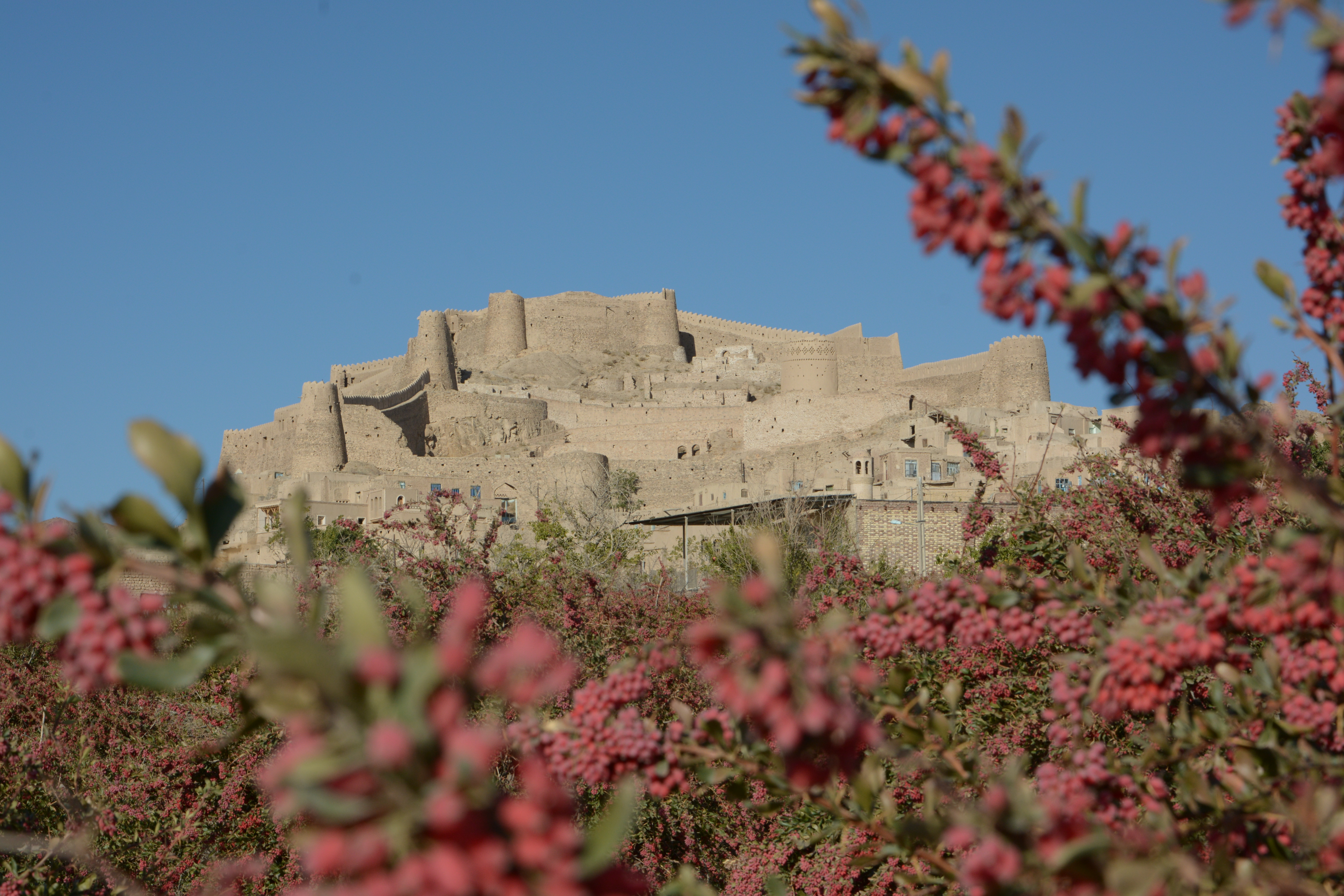

== Archaeological excavation ==
In 2001, an excavation was conducted at Furg Citadel. It identified a stable, food storage areas, burrows and corridors connecting different sections of the citadel.

Evidence shows that the citadel was actually built in the Afsharid era. The classification of Furg citadel as an Ismailia structure is debatable. Ismailia citadels were constructed in remote and hidden from view.

Like other official citadels in Iran, the Furg consisted of three sections:

- Kohandej (place of living the ruler),
- Sharestan (Place of living of the people of village)
- Rabath (farms and gardens) sections

== See also ==
- Khorasan
- Iranian architecture
