= Ab Garm, South Khorasan =

Village in South Khorasan province, Iran

Ab Garm Persian: ابگرم
- Village
- Location within Iran
- Coordinates: 32°54′19″N 60°15′39″E
- Country: Iran
- Province: South Khorasan
- County: Darmian
- District: Gazik
- Rural District: Gazik

Population (2016)
  - Total: 418
- Time zone: UTC+3:30 (IRST)

Ab Garm (Persian: ابگرم) (Note: Also romanized as Āb Garm, Āb-e Garm, Ābgarm, and Āb-i-Garm) is a village in Gazik Rural District of Gazik District in Darmian County, South Khorasan province, Iran.

== Demographics ==
=== Population ===
At the time of the 2006 National Census, the village's population was 284 in 62 households. The following census in 2011 counted 334 people in 86 households. The 2016 census measured the population of the village as 418 people in 89 households.
