= Takhvij =

Village in South Khorasan province, Iran

Takhvij Persian: تخويج
- Village
- Location within Iran
- Coordinates: 32°55′40″N 59°50′24″E
- Country: Iran
- Province: South Khorasan
- County: Darmian
- District: Miyandasht
- Rural District: Miyandasht

Population (2016)
  - Total: 189
- Time zone: UTC+3:30 (IRST)

Takhvij (Persian: تخويج) (Note: Also romanized as Takhvīj; also known as Takhīrīj, Takhrij, and Takhvīch) is a village in Miyandasht Rural District of Miyandasht District in Darmian County, South Khorasan province, Iran.

== Demographics ==
=== Population ===
At the time of the 2006 National Census, the village's population was 216 in 50 households, when it was in the Central District. The following census in 2011 counted 156 people in 43 households. The 2016 census measured the population of the village as 189 people in 60 households.

In 2021, the rural district was separated from the district in the formation of Miyandasht District.
