= Masnan =

Masnan may refer to:

- Masnàn, a mountain in Switzerland
- Mahsnan, a village in Iran
