= Nasr ol Din =

Village in South Khorasan province, Iran

Nasr ol Din Persian: نصرالدين
- Village
- Location within Iran
- Coordinates: 32°54′55″N 60°15′16″E
- Country: Iran
- Province: South Khorasan
- County: Darmian
- District: Gazik
- Rural District: Gazik

Population (2016)
  - Total: 642
- Time zone: UTC+3:30 (IRST)

Nasr ol Din (Persian: نصرالدين) (Note: Also romanized as Naşr ol Dīn; also known as Naşr od Dīn, Nasradi, Nasreddin, and Nasredī) is a village in Gazik Rural District of Gazik District in Darmian County, South Khorasan province, Iran.

== Demographics ==
=== Population ===
At the time of the 2006 National Census, the village's population was 546 in 119 households. The following census in 2011 counted 562 people in 136 households. The 2016 census measured the population of the village as 642 people in 155 households.
