= Sarv, South Khorasan =

Village in South Khorasan province, Iran

Sarv Persian: سرو
- Village
- Location within Iran
- Coordinates: 32°52′42″N 59°58′37″E
- Country: Iran
- Province: South Khorasan
- County: Darmian
- District: Central
- Rural District: Nughab

Population (2016)
  - Total: 771
- Time zone: UTC+3:30 (IRST)

Sarv (Persian: سرو) (Note: Also known as Saur, Savar, Sowr, and Sūr) is a village in Nughab Rural District of the Central District in Darmian County, South Khorasan province, Iran.

== Demographics ==
=== Population ===
At the time of the 2006 National Census, the village's population was 615 in 148 households, when it was in Darmian Rural District of the Central District. The following census in 2011 counted 700 people in 169 households. The 2016 census measured the population of the village as 771 people in 191 households.

In 2021, Sarv was separated from the rural district in the creation of Nughab Rural District.
