= Kalati, Iran =

Kalati (Persian: كلاتي) may refer to:

- Kalati, Kamyaran
- Kalati, Sanandaj

== See also ==
- Kalateh (disambiguation)
