= Anik =

Anik may refer to:

- Anik (satellite), satellites launched by Canadian telecommunications company Telesat
- Anik, Iran, a village in South Khorasan Province, Iran
- Anik Mountain
- Anik Bissonnette, a Canadian ballet dancer
- Anik Jean (born 1977), Canadian pop and rock singer, actress and screenwriter
- Anik Matern, a Canadian actress and founder of the Dynamic Theater Factory
- Jon Anik, American mixed martial arts commentator
