= Anik, Iran =

Village in South Khorasan province, Iran

Anik Persian: انيك
- Village
- Location within Iran
- Coordinates: 33°18′17″N 59°42′11″E
- Country: Iran
- Province: South Khorasan
- County: Darmian
- District: Qohestan
- Rural District: Qohestan

Population (2016)
  - Total: 404
- Time zone: UTC+3:30 (IRST)

Anik (Persian: انيك) (Note: Also romanized as Ānīk; also known as Ownīk and Ūnīk) is a village in Qohestan Rural District of Qohestan District in Darmian County, South Khorasan province, Iran.

== Demographics ==
=== Population ===
At the time of the 2006 National Census, the village's population was 525 in 136 households. The following census in 2011 counted 477 people in 134 households. The 2016 census measured the population of the village as 404 people in 110 households.
