= Kalateh-ye Baluch, Darmian =

Village in South Khorasan province, Iran

Kalateh-ye Baluch Persian: كلاته بلوچ
- Village
- Location within Iran
- Coordinates: 32°51′14″N 60°21′21″E
- Country: Iran
- Province: South Khorasan
- County: Darmian
- District: Gazik
- Rural District: Gazik

Population (2016)
  - Total: 55
- Time zone: UTC+3:30 (IRST)

Kalateh-ye Baluch (Persian: كلاته بلوچ) (Note: Also romanized as Kalateh Balooch and Kalāteh-ye Balūch; also known as Kalāt-e Balūch and Kalāteh-ye Rokh) is a village in Gazik Rural District of Gazik District in Darmian County, South Khorasan province, Iran.

== Demographics ==
=== Population ===
At the time of the 2006 National Census, the village's population was 53 in 11 households. The following census in 2011 counted 29 people in six households. The 2016 census measured the population of the village as 55 people in 12 households.
