= Govich =

Govich may refer to:

- Govij (disambiguation), places in Iran
- Milena Govich (b. 1976), American actress
