= Sahk =

Sahk may refer to:

- Tõnis Sahk (b. 1983), Estonian long jumper
- Sahk, Iran, a village in South Khorasan Province, Iran

== See also ==
- SAHK, Scout Association of Hong Kong
