= Amidabad-e Olya =

Amidabad-e Olya عميدابادعليا
- Village
- Country: Iran
- Province: South Khorasan
- County: Darmian
- Bakhsh: Central
- Rural District: Darmian

Population (2006)
  - Total: 24
- Time zone: UTC+3:30 (IRST)
  - Summer (DST): UTC+4:30 (IRDT)

Amidabad-e Olya (Persian: عميدابادعليا, also Romanized as ʿAmīdābād-e ‘Olyā) is a village in Darmian Rural District, in the Central District of Darmian County, South Khorasan Province, Iran. At the 2006 census, its population was 24, in 9 families.
