= Pa Tang, Iran =

Village in South Khorasan province, Iran

Pa Tang Persian: پاتنگ
- Village
- Location within Iran
- Coordinates: 33°03′35″N 60°18′47″E
- Country: Iran
- Province: South Khorasan
- County: Darmian
- District: Gazik
- Rural District: Gazik

Population (2016)
  - Total: 42
- Time zone: UTC+3:30 (IRST)

Pa Tang (Persian: پاتنگ) (Note: Also romanized as Pā Tang) is a village in Gazik Rural District of Gazik District in Darmian County, South Khorasan province, Iran.

== Demographics ==
=== Population ===
At the time of the 2006 National Census, the village's population was 150 in 45 households. The following census in 2011 counted 20 people in six households. The 2016 census measured the population of the village as 42 people in 12 households.
