= Khusrabad =

Khusrabad (Persian: خوسراباد) may refer to:

- Khusrabad, Isfahan
- Khusrabad, South Khorasan
