= Deh Reza =

Deh Reza or Deh-e Reza (Persian: ده رضا) may refer to various places in Iran:

- Deh-e Reza, Rigan, Kerman Province
- Deh Reza, Markazi
- Deh-e Reza, Mirjaveh, Sistan and Baluchestan Province
- Deh Reza, South Khorasan
