= Biasca (disambiguation) =

Biasca may refer to:

- Biasca, town in the district of Riviera in the canton of Ticino in Switzerland
  - Biasca–Acquarossa railway, a Swiss metre gauge railway that linked the towns of Biasca and Acquarossa, in the canton of Ticino
  - Biasca railway station, in Biasca, Swiss canton of Ticino
  - Cima di Biasca, mountain of the Swiss Lepontine Alps, located southeast of Biasca
