= Ashg =

Ashg may refer to:

- Ashk, Iran (also Ashg and Eshk), a village in South Khorasan Province, Iran
- ASHG, the acronym for the American Society of Human Genetics
