= Pa Tang =

Pa Tang may refer to:

- Pa Tang, a village in Sesant Commune, Ou Ya Dav District, Cambodia
- Pa Tang (commune), a commune in Lumphat District, Cambodia
- Pa Tang, Iran
