= Takhrij Ahadith al-Kashshaf =

- Author: Jamal al-Din al-Zayla'i
- Original title: تخريج أحاديث الكشاف للزمخشري
- Language: Arabic
- Series: Hadith Studies / Takhrij
- Subject: Hadith, Tafsir, Al-Kashshaf
- Genre: Religious, Scholarly
- Publisher: Dar Ibn Khuzaymah (Modern edition)
- Publication date: 14th Century (Original)
- Publication place: Egypt / Mamluk Sultanate
- Media type: Print
- Pages: 4 volumes (Modern edition)

Takhrij Ahadith al-Kashshaf (Arabic: تخريج أحاديث الكشاف) is a significant work of Hadith literature authored by the 14th-century scholar Jamal al-Din al-Zayla'i (d. 762 AH / 1360 CE). The book was written to verify, document, and evaluate the authenticity of the prophetic traditions (hadiths) and reports from the Companions of the Prophet (Athar) cited in the famous Quranic exegesis (Tafsir) known as Al-Kashshaf by the Mu'tazilite scholar Al-Zamakhshari.

== Background and Context ==
The source text, Al-Kashshaf, is widely regarded as a masterpiece of Arabic linguistics, rhetoric, and eloquence. However, its author, Al-Zamakhshari, was a staunch proponent of Mu'tazilite theology, and his work often incorporated hadiths that were considered weak (da'if) or fabricated (mawdu), particularly those concerning the specific virtues of various Surahs of the Quran.

During the Mamluk era, a period characterized by the flourishing of hadith sciences, scholars sought to purify the major works of Islamic scholarship from unreliable narrations. Jamal al-Din al-Zayla'i, a prominent Hanafi jurist and hadith master (hafiz), undertook the task of critically examining the traditions in Al-Kashshaf. His work is considered one of the most comprehensive examples of the genre known as Takhrij (the science of tracing and verifying hadiths).

== Methodology ==
Al-Zayla'i employed a rigorous and systematic approach in his verification process:

1. Comprehensive Coverage: He attempted to trace every hadith and report mentioned by Al-Zamakhshari, including those mentioned only by partial reference or allusion.
2. Structural Organization: The book follows the structure of the Quran, beginning with Al-Fatiha and concluding with Al-Nas, mirroring the order in which the hadiths appear in Al-Kashshaf.
3. Critical Analysis (Jarh wa Ta'dil): Zayla'i did not merely list sources; he provided detailed commentary on the narrators, citing the opinions of earlier hadith masters regarding their reliability or lack thereof.
4. Theological Critique: While primarily a work of hadith, Zayla'i occasionally pointed out the Mu'tazilite biases in Al-Zamakhshari’s interpretations, particularly where they conflicted with Sunni orthodoxy.
5. Source Diversity: He utilized a vast array of primary hadith collections, including the Kutub al-Sittah, as well as rarer manuscripts that are now lost to modern scholars.

== Significance ==
The importance of Takhrij Ahadith al-Kashshaf lies in several factors:

- Preservation of Lost Knowledge: Zayla'i quoted from several works that have since disappeared or remain in manuscript form, such as the Tafsir of Ibn Mardawayh and the Kitab al-Targhib by Ibn Shahin.
- Scholarly Objectivity: Despite being a Hanafi, Zayla'i is noted for his academic fairness and lack of sectarian bias when evaluating the chains of transmission.
- Influence on Later Scholars: The work served as the primary foundation for Ibn Hajar al-Asqalani's later abridgment and expansion, titled Al-Kafi al-Shaf fi Takhrij Ahadith al-Kashshaf. Ibn Hajar, arguably the most influential hadith scholar of the late medieval period, praised Zayla'i's thoroughness while adding his own findings to the corpus.

== Critiques ==
Despite its high standing, the work was not without criticism. Ibn Hajar al-Asqalani noted that Zayla'i occasionally missed hadiths that Al-Zamakhshari referred to only indirectly. Furthermore, Ibn Hajar pointed out that Zayla'i did not always provide the same level of scrutiny for Mawquf reports (traditions attributed to the Companions rather than the Prophet).

Modern researchers, such as Abdullah al-Saad, have defended Zayla'i, arguing that many of the "missing" reports were outside the scope of Zayla'i's intended methodology, as he focused primarily on Marfu' (prophetic) traditions and major Companion reports rather than the opinions of the Tabi'un (Successors).

== Modern Editions ==
The book has been published in several modern editions, most notably:

- An edition edited by Sultan al-Tubayshi, with an introduction by Sheikh Abdullah al-Saad, published by Dar Ibn Khuzaymah in Saudi Arabia (1414 AH) in four volumes.
- A subsequent reprint by the Ministry of Islamic Affairs of Saudi Arabia in 2003 (1424 AH).

== See also ==
- Nasb al-Rayah, another major work by Al-Zayla'i.
- List of hadith authors and commentators
- Hadith sciences
