= Amidabad-e Qazi =

Amidabad-e Qazi عميدابادقاضي
- Village
- Country: Iran
- Province: South Khorasan
- County: Darmian
- Bakhsh: Central
- Rural District: Darmian

Population (2006)
  - Total: 16
- Time zone: UTC+3:30 (IRST)
  - Summer (DST): UTC+4:30 (IRDT)

Amidabad-e Qazi (Persian: عميدابادقاضي, also Romanized as ʿAmīdābād-e Qāz̤ī) is a village in Darmian Rural District, in the Central District of Darmian County, South Khorasan Province, Iran. At the 2006 census, its population was 16, in 5 families.
