= Naginu =

Naginu may refer to:

- Neginan
- Neygenan
