= Ashk, Iran =

Village in South Khorasan province, Iran

Ashk Persian: اشك
- Village
- Location within Iran
- Coordinates: 33°01′50″N 60°05′18″E
- Country: Iran
- Province: South Khorasan
- County: Darmian
- District: Central
- Rural District: Nughab

Population (2016)
  - Total: 619
- Time zone: UTC+3:30 (IRST)

Ashk (Persian: اشك) (Note: Also romanized as Eshk; also known as Ashg, Kaleh Ishq, Qal‘eh Ishq, and Qal‘eh-ye ‘Eshq) is a village in Nughab Rural District of the Central District in Darmian County, South Khorasan province, Iran.

== Demographics ==
=== Population ===
At the time of the 2006 National Census, the village's population was 569 in 109 households, when it was in Darmian Rural District of the Central District. The following census in 2011 counted 660 people in 147 households. The 2016 census measured the population of the village as 619 people in 133 households.

In 2021, Ashk was separated from the rural district in the creation of Nughab Rural District.
