= Gesg =

Gesg or GESG may refer to:

- Gesk, North Khorasan Province
- Gask, Iran, in South Khorasan Province
- GESG, the Grupo Ecológico Sierra Gorda founded by Martha Isabel Ruiz Corzo
