= Amidabad-e Sofla =

Amidabad-e Sofla عميدابادسفلي
- Village
- Location within Iran
- Coordinates: 32°48′26″N 59°54′34″E
- Country: Iran
- Province: South Khorasan
- County: Darmian
- Bakhsh: Central
- Rural District: Darmian

Population (2006)
  - Total: 45
- Time zone: UTC+3:30 (IRST)
  - Summer (DST): UTC+4:30 (IRDT)

Amidabad-e Sofla (Persian: عميدابادسفلي, also Romanized as ʿAmīdābād-e Soflá; also known as Amīdābād-e Paeen) is a village in Darmian Rural District, in the Central District of Darmian County, South Khorasan Province, Iran. At the 2006 census, its population was 45, in 17 families.
