= Gavij, South Khorasan =

Village in South Khorasan province, Iran

Gavij Persian: گاويج
- Village
- Location within Iran
- Coordinates: 32°54′58″N 60°16′40″E
- Country: Iran
- Province: South Khorasan
- County: Darmian
- District: Gazik
- Rural District: Gazik

Population (2016)
  - Total: 484
- Time zone: UTC+3:30 (IRST)

Gavij (Persian: گاويج) (Note: Also romanized as Gāvīj; also known as Gāvīch, Gāvoj, Gāwich, Kalāt-e Gāvīch, Kalateh Gavij, and Kalāteh-ye Gāvoj) is a village in Gazik Rural District of Gazik District in Darmian County, South Khorasan province, Iran.

== Demographics ==
=== Population ===
At the time of the 2006 National Census, the village's population was 381 in 74 households. The following census in 2011 counted 410 people in 90 households. The 2016 census measured the population of the village as 484 people in 115 households.
