= Kalateh-ye Baluch =

Kalateh-ye Baluch or Kalateh-ye Baluch (Persian: كلاته بلوچ) may refer to:

- Kalateh-ye Baluch, Darmian
- Kalateh-ye Boluch, Sarbisheh
