= Awaz (disambiguation) =

Awaz may refer to:

- Awaz, a Pakistani musical band
  - Awaz (album)
- Awaz (1978 film), a Pakistani film
- Awaaz, a 1984 Indian Hindi-language film by Shakti Samanta
- Awaz - Dil Se Dil Tak, Indian television series
- Awaz Television Network, a Sindhi-language television channel
- Awaz, South Khorasan, a village in South Khorasan Province, Iran
- Awaz Sayeed, Indian Urdu writer

== See also ==
- Avaz (disambiguation)
- Aaj Ki Awaaz (lit. 'Today's Voice'), a 1984 Indian film by Ravi Chopra
