= Kushkak Rural District =

Rural district in South Khorasan province, Iran

Kushkak Rural District Persian: دهستان کوشکک
- Rural District
- Location within Iran
- Coordinates: 33°08′N 59°41′E
- Country: Iran
- Province: South Khorasan
- County: Darmian
- District: Qohestan
- Established: 2021
- Capital: Kushkak
- Time zone: UTC+3:30 (IRST)

Kushkak Rural District (Persian: دهستان کوشکک) is in Qohestan District of Darmian County, South Khorasan province, Iran. Its capital is the village of Kushkak, whose population at the time of the 2016 National Census was 877 people in 277 households.

== History ==
Kushkak Rural District was created in Qohestan District in 2021.

== Other villages in the rural district ==
- Aliabad-e Farhang
- Avishk
- Bidesk-e Monond
- Darreh-ye Abbas
- Fazlabad
- Furkhas
- Gaz
- Khosrowabad
- Khvorshidan
- Komachi
- Lati
- Monond-e Bala
- Neginan
- Rejnuk
- Serijan
- Seyyedabad
- Shamsabad
- Tangal
