= Avaz, South Khorasan =

Village in South Khorasan province, Iran

Avaz Persian: اواز
- Village
- Location within Iran
- Coordinates: 32°57′02″N 60°15′29″E
- Country: Iran
- Province: South Khorasan
- County: Darmian
- District: Gazik
- Rural District: Gazik

Population (2016)
  - Total: 1,696
- Time zone: UTC+3:30 (IRST)

Avaz (Persian: اواز) (Note: Also romanized as Āvāz and Awāz; also known as Ahvāz) is a village in Gazik Rural District of Gazik District in Darmian County, South Khorasan province, Iran.

== Demographics ==
=== Population ===
At the time of the 2006 National Census, the village's population was 1,760 in 404 households. The following census in 2011 counted 1,934 people in 509 households. The 2016 census measured the population of the village as 1,696 people in 457 households, the most populous in its rural district.
