= Furg, Darmian =

Village in South Khorasan province, Iran

Furg Persian: فورگ
- Village
- Location within Iran
- Coordinates: 32°50′41″N 59°56′59″E
- Country: Iran
- Province: South Khorasan
- County: Darmian
- District: Central
- Rural District: Nughab

Population (2016)
  - Total: 690
- Time zone: UTC+3:30 (IRST)

Furg (Persian: فورگ) (Note: Also romanized as Foorag and Fūrg; also known as Fūrk) is a village in Nughab Rural District of the Central District in Darmian County, South Khorasan province, Iran.

== Demographics ==
=== Population ===
At the time of the 2006 National Census, the village's population was 854 in 240 households, when it was in Darmian Rural District of the Central District. The following census in 2011 counted 698 people in 213 households. The 2016 census measured the population of the village as 690 people in 204 households.

In 2021, Furg was separated from the rural district in the creation of Nughab Rural District.
