= Qohestan =

City in South Khorasan province, Iran

Qohestan Persian: قهستان
- City
- Location within Iran
- Coordinates: 33°09′22″N 59°42′49″E
- Country: Iran
- Province: South Khorasan
- County: Darmian
- District: Qohestan
- Established as a city: 2008

Population (2016)
  - Total: 2,322
- Time zone: UTC+3:30 (IRST)

Qohestan (Persian: قهستان) (Note: Also romanized as Qohestān; formerly the village of Darakhsh) is a city in, and the capital of, Qohestan District in Darmian County, South Khorasan province, Iran. It also serves as the administrative center for Qohestan Rural District.

== History ==
In 2005, the village of Derakhsh (درخش) merged with the village of Asiyaban (آسیابان) and was renamed the village of Qohestan, which was converted to a city in 2008.

== Demographics ==
=== Population ===
At the time of the 2006 National Census, Qohestan's population was 2,451 in 674 households, when it was a village in Qohestan Rural District. The following census in 2011 counted 3,028 people in 741 households, by which time the village had been converted to a city. The 2016 census measured the population of the city as 2,322 people in 701 households.
