= Gavij =

Gavij or Gevij or Govij (Persian: گويج or گاويج) may refer to:

- Gavij, East Azerbaijan (گويج - Gavīj)
- Gavij, South Khorasan (گاويج - Gāvīj)
