= Razeh, South Khorasan =

Village in South Khorasan province, Iran

Razeh Persian: رزه
- Village
- Location within Iran
- Coordinates: 32°39′20″N 60°17′17″E
- Country: Iran
- Province: South Khorasan
- County: Darmian
- District: Gazik
- Rural District: Tabas-e Masina

Population (2016)
  - Total: 205
- Time zone: UTC+3:30 (IRST)

Razeh (Persian: رزه) (Note: Also romanized as Razzeh; also known as Deh Rezā, Deh Riza, Deh-e Reẕā, Deh-e Razeh, Paza, Rezā, and Riza) is a village in Tabas-e Masina Rural District of Gazik District in Darmian County, South Khorasan province, Iran. Portions of the 1928 German silent film Folly of Love were filmed here.

== Demographics ==
=== Population ===
At the time of the 2006 National Census, the village's population was 261 in 60 households. The following census in 2011 counted 219 people in 61 households. The 2016 census measured the population of the village as 205 people in 54 households.
