= Gazik, Darmian =

City in South Khorasan province, Iran

Gazik Persian: گزیک
- City
- Location within Iran
- Coordinates: 32°59′57″N 60°13′35″E
- Country: Iran
- Province: South Khorasan
- County: Darmian
- District: Gazik
- Established as a city: 2010

Population (2016)
  - Total: 2,294
- Time zone: UTC+3:30 (IRST)

Gazik (Persian: گزیک) (Note: Also romanized as Gazīk and Gezīk; also known as Kazik) is a city in, and the capital of, Gazik District in Darmian County, South Khorasan province, Iran. It also serves as the administrative center for Gazik Rural District.

== Demographics ==
=== Population ===
At the time of the 2006 National Census, Gazik's population was 2,773 in 775 households, when it was a village in Gazik Rural District. The following census in 2011 counted 2,934 people in 835 households, by which time Gazik had been converted to a city. The 2016 census measured the population of the city as 2,294 people in 679 households.
