= Miyandasht Rural District (Darmian County) =

Rural district in South Khorasan province, Iran

Miyandasht Rural District Persian: دهستان مياندشت
- Rural District
- Location within Iran
- Coordinates: 33°01′N 59°52′E
- Country: Iran
- Province: South Khorasan
- County: Darmian
- District: Miyandasht
- Established: 2005
- Capital: Bureng

Population (2016)
  - Total: 9,811
- Time zone: UTC+3:30 (IRST)

Miyandasht Rural District (Persian: دهستان مياندشت) is in Miyandasht District of Darmian County, South Khorasan province, Iran. Its capital is the village of Bureng.

== Demographics ==
=== Population ===
At the time of the 2006 National Census, the rural district's population (as a part of the Central District) was 9,791 in 2,385 households. There were 10,378 inhabitants in 2,851 households at the following census of 2011. The 2016 census measured the population of the rural district as 9,811 in 2,808 households. The most populous of its 23 villages was Nughab (now in Nughab Rural District of the Central District), with 3,520 people.

In 2021, the rural district was separated from the district in the formation of Miyandasht District.

=== Other villages in the rural district ===
- Asadiyeh
- Chak
- Darreh Charm
- Hendevalan
- Khalaf
- Mehdiabad
- Mohammadiyeh
- Moqdar
- Nowzad
- Khunik-e Baz
- Mah Banu
- Mask
- Nakh Ab
- Qasemabad
- Takhvij
- Tashvand
