= Masnàn =

Mountain in Switzerland

- Location within Switzerland

Highest point
- Elevation: 2,505 m (8,219 ft)
- Prominence: 30 m (98 ft)
- Parent peak: Cima di Biasca
- Coordinates: 46°20′40.8″N 9°0′51″E

Geography
- Location: Ticino, Switzerland
- Parent range: Lepontine Alps

The Masnàn is a mountain of the Swiss Lepontine Alps, located east of Biasca and Osogna in the canton of Ticino.
