= Gazik Rural District =

Rural district in South Khorasan province, Iran

Gazik Rural District Persian: دهستان گزيك
- Rural District
- Location within Iran
- Coordinates: 33°02′10″N 60°22′44″E
- Country: Iran
- Province: South Khorasan
- County: Darmian
- District: Gazik
- Capital: Gazik

Population (2016)
  - Total: 4,201
- Time zone: UTC+3:30 (IRST)

Gazik Rural District (Persian: دهستان گزيك) is in Gazik District of Darmian County, South Khorasan province, Iran. It is administered from the city of Gazik.

== Demographics ==
=== Population ===
At the time of the 2006 National Census, the rural district's population was 6,742 in 1,648 households. There were 4,151 inhabitants in 1,034 households at the following census of 2011. The 2016 census measured the population of the rural district as 4,201 in 1,039 households. The most populous of its 16 villages was Avaz, with 1,696 people.

=== Other villages in the rural district ===
- Ab Garm
- Gavij
- Kalateh-ye Baluch
- Kalateh-ye Gavich
- Kheyrabad
- Nasr ol Din
- Pa Tang
- Qaleh Now
