= Shirk (surname) =

Shirk is a surname. Notable people with the surname include:

- Amos Urban Shirk (c. 1890 – 1956), American businessman
- Bill Shirk (born 1945), American escape artist
- Dave Shirk, visual effects supervisor
- Eugene Shirk (1901–1994), American politician
- Gary Shirk (born 1950), American football player
- George H. Shirk (1913–1977), American lawyer and historian
- James Shirk (1832–1873), American naval officer
- John Shirk (1917–1993), American football player
- Marshall Shirk (born 1940), American player of Canadian football
- Mary Kimberly Shirk (1880–1979), American philanthropist
- Matthew Shirk (born 1973), American lawyer
- Susan Shirk (born c. 1945), American academic
