= Avaz Zeynalli =

Azerbaijani critic and investigative journalist (1970–2026)

- Əvəz Zeynallı
- Zeynalli in 2018
- Born: Avaz Tapdig oglu Zeynalli; 1 January 1970; Agbulag, Goycha district, Armenian SSR, USSR
- Died: 28 September 2026 (aged 56)
- Citizenship: Azerbaijan
- Education: Ankara University
- Occupation: Journalist
- Known for: Investigative journalist, critic
- Television: Xural TV online YouTube channel

Avaz Zeynalli (Azerbaijani: Əvəz Tapdıq oğlu Zeynallı; 1 January 1970 – 28 September 2026) was an Azerbaijani critic, investigative journalist and media executive. He was the head of the Xural Media Group, founder of the Xural TV online YouTube channel, and the author and host of the socio-political program Siyasət Meydanı ("Political Arena").

== Early life and education ==
Zeynalli was born on 1 January 1970, in the village of Aghbulag, located in the Goycha region. In 1988, he was deported from Armenia alongside other ethnic Azerbaijanis during rising ethnic tensions. Between 1988 and 1990, he served in the Soviet army.

In 1991, Zeynalli enrolled at the Faculty of Law at Ankara University in Turkey. Upon graduating in 1999, he returned to Azerbaijan and began working for various newspapers.

== Career ==
While studying in Turkey, Zeynalli published the magazine Böyük Gələcək ("Great Future"). After returning to Azerbaijan, he contributed to several newspapers, including Günaydın, P.S., and Millətin Səsi ("The Nation’s Voice"), and served as editor-in-chief of Vətəndaş Həmrəyliyi ("Civic Solidarity").

In 2002, he founded the newspaper Xural, acting as its editor-in-chief. Since 2010, he has managed the website xural.org, which serves as a platform for independent journalism in Azerbaijan.

In addition to his journalistic work, Zeynalli has translated multiple books into Azerbaijani. Among them is The Prize by Daniel Yergin, a widely acclaimed work on the history and politics of the global oil industry.

== Public initiatives ==
Zeynalli is credited with promoting the idea of establishing a National Lovers' Day in Azerbaijan. He proposed celebrating June 30, the wedding anniversary of January 20 martyrs Ilham and Fariza, as a day to honor love and devotion. He actively campaigned for the adoption of this idea through public events and media initiatives.

In 2006, he published the book June 30 – Lovers' Day. During his imprisonment between 2011 and 2014, he authored a 40-volume prison diary titled Selcanın Məmləkəti (Selcan's Homeland) , parts of which have been published four times.

== Legal issues and imprisonment ==
In 2011, Zeynalli was arrested on charges including large-scale bribery, extortion through threats, repeated bribery, and tax evasion. Zeynalli denied the charges and asserted that his imprisonment was politically motivated. The European Court of Human Rights (ECHR) ruled that Zeynalli's 2011 detention violated several provisions of the European Convention on Human Rights, including Articles 5§3, 6§1, 6§3(d), 8, and 10. The Court found that Azerbaijan had failed to protect his rights to a fair trial and freedom of expression. Following the ruling, it was recommended that the Supreme Court acquit Zeynalli and compensate him for both moral and material damages.

He was sentenced to prison for 9 years but was released in 2014 following a presidential pardon issued by President Ilham Aliyev.

On 10 September 2022, he was arrested again under Articles 311.3.3 and later 312–1 of the Criminal Code. Zeynalli rejected all accusations, maintaining that the charges were politically motivated and related to his professional activities as a journalist.

In April 2025, while still imprisoned, Zeynalli was diagnosed with metastatic colon cancer, with the disease having spread to his liver. Avaz Zeynalli was released following his appeal to the court for release from the remainder of his sentence due to his illness.

== Personal life and death ==
Zeynalli was married to Melahat Zeynalli, who is also a journalist. The couple had two daughters. He died of colon cancer on 28 September 2026, at the age of 56.
