= Nughab Rural District =

Rural district in South Khorasan province, Iran

Nughab Rural District Persian: دهستان نوغاب
- Rural District
- Location within Iran
- Coordinates: 32°59′N 60°05′E
- Country: Iran
- Province: South Khorasan
- County: Darmian
- District: Central
- Established: 2021
- Capital: Nughab
- Time zone: UTC+3:30 (IRST)

Nughab Rural District (Persian: دهستان نوغاب) is in the Central District of Darmian County, South Khorasan province, Iran. Its capital is the village of Nughab, whose population at the time of the National Census of 2016 was 3,520 people in 927 households.

== History ==
Nughab Rural District was established in the Central District in 2021.

== Other villages in the rural district ==
- Arreh Furg
- Ashk
- Bonyab
- Daftabad-e Olya
- Furg
- Gol Afshan Shahr
- Mahmudabad
- Rud-e Robat
- Sarv
- Taghan
- Zaliran
- Zeydan
