= Asadiyeh =

City in South Khorasan province, Iran

Asadiyeh Persian: اسديه
- City
- Location within Iran
- Coordinates: 32°54′49″N 60°01′18″E
- Country: Iran
- Province: South Khorasan
- County: Darmian
- District: Central
- Established as a city: 1996

Population (2016)
  - Total: 5,460
- Time zone: UTC+3:30 (IRST)

Asadiyeh (Persian: اسديه) (Note: Also romanized as Asadīyeh; formerly the village of Asadabad (اسدآباد), also romanized as Asadābād) is a city in the Central District of Darmian County, South Khorasan province, Iran, serving as both capital of the county and the district. The village of Asadabad was converted to a city in 1996 and renamed Asadiyeh.

== Demographics ==
=== Population ===
At the time of the 2006 National Census, the city's population was 4,312 in 969 households. The following census in 2011 counted 5,804 people in 1,330 households. The 2016 census measured the population of the city as 5,460 people in 1,383 households.
