= Nughab, Sarbisheh =

Nughab نوغاب
- Village
- Location within Iran
- Coordinates: 32°23′07″N 59°41′27″E
- Country: Iran
- Province: South Khorasan
- County: Sarbisheh
- Bakhsh: Central
- Rural District: Momenabad

Population (2006)
  - Total: 92
- Time zone: UTC+3:30 (IRST)
  - Summer (DST): UTC+4:30 (IRDT)

Nughab (Persian: نوغاب, also Romanized as Nūghāb, Nowghāb, Naughāb, Nooghab, and Nūqhāb) is a village in Momenabad Rural District, in the Central District of Sarbisheh County, South Khorasan Province, Iran. At the 2006 census, its population was 92, in 22 families.
