= Nughab, Birjand =

Nughab نوغاب
- Village
- Location within Iran
- Coordinates: 33°03′12″N 59°26′35″E
- Country: Iran
- Province: South Khorasan
- County: Birjand
- Bakhsh: Central
- Rural District: Kahshang

Population (2006)
  - Total: 105
- Time zone: UTC+3:30 (IRST)
  - Summer (DST): UTC+4:30 (IRDT)

Nughab (Persian: نوغاب, also Romanized as Nūghāb; also known as Nowghāb-e Zīrak, Naughā, and Nowgāh) is a village in Kahshang Rural District, in the Central District of Birjand County, South Khorasan Province, Iran. At the 2006 census, its population was 105, in 42 families.
