= Avaz Jabiyev =

Azerbaijani medical doctor

- Əvəz Cəbiyev
- Born: 14 May 1922; Azerbaijan SSR Masalli Arkivan
- Died: 20 October 1977; Baku
- Resting place: Masalli Arkivan
- Citizenship: Azerbaijan SSR
- Education: Azerbaijan Medical University
- Scientific career
- Fields: Medicine
- Doctoral advisor: A. L. Myasnikov

Avaz Abdulhasan oglu Jabiyev (May 14, 1922, Arkivan, Masalli district – October 20, 1977, Baku) was an Azerbaijani doctor of medical sciences, and a professor.

He was the first doctor of medical sciences in Masally District and the first scientist in Arkivan village. Masalli District Central Hospital is named after A. Jabiyev.

Avaz Jabiyev was born on May 14, 1922, in the Jabili neighborhood of the Arkivan village of the Masalli region. He died on October 20, 1977, at the age of 55, in Baku, and was buried in the Jabili cemetery of Arkivan. On May 14, 2022, the 100th anniversary of his birth was celebrated in the city of Masalli, where he was born.

== Education ==
Avaz Jabiyev completed his secondary education at the Arkivan village secondary school. In 1948, he graduated from the treatment and prevention faculty of the Azerbaijan State Medical Institute named after N. Narimanov. He continued his education at the institute's postgraduate school and then took advanced training courses in Leningrad (now Saint Petersburg) in 1952 and at the I.M. Sechenov Moscow Medical Institute in 1968. Jabiyev wanted to become an engineer, but scientist and physician Mirkazım Aslanli-Sareng inspired him to become a doctor.

== Career ==
In 1940–1943, he taught physics, mathematics and chemistry at the secondary school No. 2 of Masallı city. In 1943–1944, Jabiyev worked at the State Insurance Inspectorate under the Finance Department of the Masalli district. In March 1948, he continued his studies at the Department of Infectious Diseases of the Azerbaijan State Medical Institute. In 1951–1952, Jabiyev worked at the Baku city medical school No. 3, and in 1952–1956, at the N.A. Semashko hospital. In 1952, Jabiyev took advanced training courses in Saint Petersburg and in 1968 in Moscow. He was appointed assistant professor at the first department of medicine at the Azerbaijan State Medical Institute in 1956, associate professor in March 1963, and professor in June 1969, and worked at the institute (now Azerbaijan Medical University) until the end of his life.

== Scientific activity ==
In 1954, Avaz Jabiyev defended his dissertation on "Carbohydrate metabolism in endemic typhus" to receive the degree of candidate of medical sciences. This was his first scientific success. In May 1968, the scientist defended his doctoral dissertation on "Epidemiology of ischemic heart disease among various population groups of Azerbaijan". By 1973, 54 scientific works of Avaz Jabiyev were published in the country's press. He has lectured and presented papers at conferences and congresses, symposiums and meetings held abroad. The study of atherosclerosis also occupies a special place in his scientific activity. A. L. Myasnikov, a full member of the Academy of Sciences of the Soviet Union and scientific advisor to Avaz Jabiyev in the defense of his doctoral dissertation, wrote important notes on atherosclerosis in his monograph "Hypertension and Atherosclerosis", referring to ideas of Avaz.
