= Zekri (surname) =

Zekri is a surname. Notable people with the surname include:

- Karim Zekri (born 1985), Egyptian footballer
- Mohamed Zekri (born 1985), Egyptian footballer
- Noureddine Zekri, Algerian footballer
- Talaat Zekri (born 1945), Chairman & CEO of Zekri Group & Zekri Tours Former Honorary Consul of Estonia in Cairo-Egypt 2001–2008
