= Avaz, Razavi Khorasan =

Avaz عوض
- Village
- Location within Iran
- Coordinates: 36°15′44″N 57°56′42″E
- Country: Iran
- Province: Razavi Khorasan
- County: Sabzevar
- Bakhsh: Central
- Rural District: Robat

Population (2006)
  - Total: 309
- Time zone: UTC+3:30 (IRST)
  - Summer (DST): UTC+4:30 (IRDT)

Avaz (Persian: عوض, also Romanized as ‘Avaẕ) is a village in Robat Rural District, in the Central District of Sabzevar County, Razavi Khorasan Province, Iran. At the 2006 census, its population was 309, in 87 families.

== See also ==
- List of cities, towns and villages in Razavi Khorasan Province
