= Kalateh, Ilam =

Kalateh كلاته
- Village
- Location within Iran
- Coordinates: 33°45′39″N 47°02′48″E
- Country: Iran
- Province: Ilam
- County: Chardavol
- Bakhsh: Helilan
- Rural District: Helilan

Population (2006)
  - Total: 67
- Time zone: UTC+3:30 (IRST)
  - Summer (DST): UTC+4:30 (IRDT)

Kalateh (Persian: كلاته, also Romanized as Kalāteh; also known as Kalāteh-ye Halīlān) is a village in Helilan Rural District, Helilan District, Chardavol County, Ilam Province, Iran. At the 2006 census, its population was 67, in 14 families. The village is populated by Kurds.
