= Chal Konar =

Chal Konar چال كنار
- Village
- Location within Iran
- Coordinates: 32°03′43″N 49°23′42″E
- Country: Iran
- Province: Khuzestan
- County: Dezful
- Bakhsh: Sardasht
- Rural District: Seyyedvaliyeddin

Population (2006)
  - Total: 24
- Time zone: UTC+3:30 (IRST)
  - Summer (DST): UTC+4:30 (IRDT)

Chal Konar (Persian: چال كنار, also Romanized as Chāl Konār; also known as Reẕā) is a village in Seyyedvaliyeddin Rural District, Sardasht District, Dezful County, Khuzestan Province, Iran. It is the home of Iran's annual Folly Festival. At the time of the 2006 census, its population was 24, in 4 families.
