= Deh-e Reza, Rigan =

Deh-e Reza ده رضا
- Village
- Location within Iran
- Coordinates: 28°40′36″N 59°15′27″E
- Country: Iran
- Province: Kerman
- County: Rigan
- Bakhsh: Central
- Rural District: Rigan

Population (2006)
  - Total: 229
- Time zone: UTC+3:30 (IRST)
  - Summer (DST): UTC+4:30 (IRDT)

Deh-e Reza (Persian: ده رضا, also Romanized as Deh-e Reẕā) is a village in Rigan Rural District, in the Central District of Rigan County, Kerman Province, Iran. At the 2006 census, its population was 229, in 58 families.
