= Cima di Biasca =

Mountain in Switzerland

- Location within Switzerland

Highest point
- Elevation: 2,574 m (8,445 ft)
- Prominence: 146 m (479 ft)
- Parent peak: Torent Alto
- Coordinates: 46°20′46″N 9°01′21″E

Geography
- Location: Ticino, Switzerland
- Parent range: Lepontine Alps

The Cima di Biasca is a mountain of the Swiss Lepontine Alps, located southeast of Biasca in the canton of Ticino.
