= Kalati, Sanandaj =

Kalati كلاتي
- Village
- Location within Iran
- Coordinates: 35°18′32″N 46°43′26″E
- Country: Iran
- Province: Kurdistan
- County: Sanandaj
- Bakhsh: Kalatrazan
- Rural District: Zhavarud-e Gharbi

Population (2006)
  - Total: 621
- Time zone: UTC+3:30 (IRST)
  - Summer (DST): UTC+4:30 (IRDT)

Kalati (Persian: كلاتي, also Romanized as Kalātī; also known as Kalāleh, Kalate, and Kalāteh) is a village in Zhavarud-e Gharbi Rural District, Kalatrazan District, Sanandaj County, Kurdistan Province, Iran. At the 2006 census, its population was 621, in 152 families. The village is populated by Kurds.
