= Kalati, Kamyaran =

Kalati كلاتي
- Village
- Location within Iran
- Coordinates: 34°52′32″N 46°44′36″E
- Country: Iran
- Province: Kurdistan
- County: Kamyaran
- Bakhsh: Central
- Rural District: Zhavehrud

Population (2006)
  - Total: 221
- Time zone: UTC+3:30 (IRST)
  - Summer (DST): UTC+4:30 (IRDT)

Kalati (Persian: كلاتي, also Romanized as Kalātī; also known as Kalāteh) is a village in Zhavehrud Rural District, in the Central District of Kamyaran County, Kurdistan Province, Iran. At the 2006 census, its population was 221, in 53 families. The village is populated by Kurds.
