= Tabas-e Masina Rural District =

Rural district in South Khorasan province, Iran

Tabas-e Masina Rural District Persian: دهستان طبس مسينا
- Rural District
- Location within Iran
- Coordinates: 32°44′N 60°26′E
- Country: Iran
- Province: South Khorasan
- County: Darmian
- District: Gazik
- Established: 1987
- Capital: Tabas-e Masina

Population (2016)
  - Total: 4,778
- Time zone: UTC+3:30 (IRST)

Tabas-e Masina Rural District (Persian: دهستان طبس مسينا) is in Gazik District of Darmian County, South Khorasan province, Iran. It is administered from the city of Tabas-e Masina.

== Demographics ==
=== Population ===
At the time of the 2006 National Census, the rural district's population was 8,347 in 1,733 households. There were 4,554 inhabitants in 1,072 households at the following census of 2011. The 2016 census measured the population of the rural district as 4,778 in 1,147 households. The most populous of its 28 villages was Dastgerd, with 1,262 people.

=== Other villages in the rural district ===
- Ahmadabad
- Aliabad
- Feyzabad
- Mohammadabad
- Razeh
