= Fakhrrud Rural District =

Rural district in South Khorasan province, Iran

Fakhrrud Rural District Persian: دهستان فخررود
- Rural District
- Location within Iran
- Coordinates: 33°02′N 59°38′E
- Country: Iran
- Province: South Khorasan
- County: Darmian
- District: Miyandasht
- Established: 1987
- Capital: Gask

Population (2016)
  - Total: 4,889
- Time zone: UTC+3:30 (IRST)

Fakhrrud Rural District (Persian: دهستان فخررود) is in Miyandasht District of Darmian County, South Khorasan province, Iran. Its capital is the village of Gask.

== Demographics ==
=== Population ===
At the time of the 2006 National Census, the rural district's population (as a part of Qohestan District) was 5,446 in 1,530 households. There were 5,183 inhabitants in 1,481 households at the following census of 2011. The 2016 census measured the population of the rural district as 4,889 in 1,489 households. The most populous of its 23 villages was Gask, with 581 people.

In 2021, the rural district was separated from the district in the formation of Miyandasht District.

=== Other villages in the rural district ===
- Abdoleh
- Aliabad-e Fakhrud
- Asfich
- Avijan
- Fizik
- Mansurabad
- Pir Zanuk
- Sehk
- Seyyedan
- Shirk
- Zargaz
