= Qohestan Rural District =

Rural district in South Khorasan province, Iran

Qohestan Rural District Persian: دهستان قهستان
- Rural District
- Location within Iran
- Coordinates: 33°14′N 59°50′E
- Country: Iran
- Province: South Khorasan
- County: Darmian
- District: Qohestan
- Established: 1987
- Capital: Qohestan

Population (2016)
  - Total: 7,084
- Time zone: UTC+3:30 (IRST)

Qohestan Rural District (Persian: دهستان قهستان) is in Qohestan District of Darmian County, South Khorasan province, Iran. It is administered from the city of Qohestan. (Note: Formerly the village of Derakhsh)

== Demographics ==
=== Population ===
At the time of the 2006 National Census, the rural district's population was 9,849 in 2,819 households. There were 7,275 inhabitants in 2,158 households at the following census of 2011. The 2016 census measured the population of the rural district as 7,084 in 2,136 households. The most populous of its 41 villages was Khuniksar, with 1,118 people.

=== Other villages in the rural district ===
- Anik
- Barandud
- Git
- Khvan
- Sarab-e Sofla
- Takhteh-ye Jan
- Zir Barandud
