= Gazik District =

District in South Khorasan province, Iran

Gazik District Persian: بخش گزیک
- District
- Location within Iran
- Coordinates: 32°54′N 60°26′E
- Country: Iran
- Province: South Khorasan
- County: Darmian
- Established: 2005
- Capital: Gazik

Population (2016)
  - Total: 15,869
- Time zone: UTC+3:30 (IRST)

Gazik District (Persian: بخش گزیک) is in Darmian County, South Khorasan province, Iran. Its capital is the city of Gazik.

== History ==
The village of Tabas-e Masina was converted to a city in 2008, and likewise the village of Gazik in 2010.

== Demographics ==
=== Population ===
At the time of the 2006 census, the district's population was 15,089 in 3,381 households. The following census in 2011 counted 15,772 people in 3,920 households. The 2016 census measured the population of the district as 15,869 inhabitants in 3,937 households.

=== Administrative divisions ===
Gazik District Population
Administrative Divisions	2006	2011	2016
Gazik RD	6,742	4,151	4,201
Tabas-e Masina RD	8,347	4,554	4,778
Gazik (city)		2,934	2,294
Tabas-e Masina (city)		4,133	4,596
Total	15,089	15,772	15,869
RD = Rural District
