= Central District (Darmian County) =

District in South Khorasan province, Iran

Central District (Darmian County) Persian: بخش مرکزی شهرستان درمیان
- District
- Location within Iran
- Coordinates: 32°58′N 60°00′E
- Country: Iran
- Province: South Khorasan
- County: Darmian
- Established: 2005
- Capital: Asadiyeh

Population (2016)
  - Total: 23,550
- Time zone: UTC+3:30 (IRST)

The Central District of Darmian County (Persian: بخش مرکزی شهرستان درمیان) is in South Khorasan province, Iran. Its capital is the city of Asadiyeh.

== History ==
In 2021 Nughab Rural District was established in the district, and Miyandasht Rural District was separated from it in the formation of Miyandasht District.

== Demographics ==
=== Population ===
At the time of the 2006 National Census, the district's population was 21,409 in 5,163 households. The following census in 2011 counted 23,822 people in 6,166 households. The 2016 census measured the population of the district as 23,550 inhabitants in 6,376 households.

=== Administrative divisions ===
Central District (Darmian County) Population
Administrative Divisions	2006	2011	2016
Darmian RD	7,306	7,640	8,279
Miyandasht RD (Note: Transferred to Miyandasht District after the 2016 census)	9,791	10,378	9,811
Nughab RD (Note: Established after the 2016 census)			
Asadiyeh (city)	4,312	5,804	5,460
Total	21,409	23,822	23,550
RD = Rural District
