= Miyandasht District =

District in South Khorasan province, Iran

Miyandasht District Persian: بخش میاندشت
- District
- Location within Iran
- Coordinates: 33°02′N 59°44′E
- Country: Iran
- Province: South Khorasan
- County: Darmian
- Established: 2021
- Capital: Bureng
- Time zone: UTC+3:30 (IRST)

Miyandasht District (Persian: بخش میاندشت) is in Darmian County, South Khorasan province, Iran. Its capital is the village of Bureng, whose population at the time of the 2016 National Census was 2,276 people in 687 households.

== History ==
In 2021, Fakhrud Rural District was separated from Qohestan District, and Miyandasht Rural District from the Central District, in the formation of Miyandasht District.

== Demographics ==
=== Administrative divisions ===
Miyandasht District
Administrative Divisions
Fakhrud RD
Miyandasht RD
RD = Rural District
