= Qohestan District =

District in South Khorasan province, Iran

Qohestan District Persian: بخش قهستان
- District
- Location within Iran
- Coordinates: 33°11′N 59°48′E
- Country: Iran
- Province: South Khorasan
- County: Darmian
- Established: 2005
- Capital: Qohestan

Population (2016)
  - Total: 14,295
- Time zone: UTC+3:30 (IRST)

Qohestan District (Persian: بخش قهستان) is in Darmian County, South Khorasan province, Iran. Its capital is the city of Qohestan.

== History ==
The village of Qohestan was converted to a city in 2008. In 2021, Kushkak Rural District was created in the district, and Fakhrud Rural District was separated from it in the formation of Miyandasht District.

== Demographics ==
=== Population ===
At the time of the 2006 National Census, the district's population was 15,295 in 4,349 households. The following census in 2011 counted 15,486 people in 4,380 households. The 2016 census measured the population of the district as 14,295 inhabitants in 4,326 households.

=== Administrative divisions ===
Qohestan District Population
| Administrative Divisions | 2006 | 2011 | 2016 |
|---|---|---|---|
| Fakhrud RD (Note: Transferred to Miyandasht District after the 2016 census) | 5,446 | 5,183 | 4,889 |
| Kushkak RD (Note: Established after the 2016 census) | | | |
| Qohestan RD | 9,849 | 7,275 | 7,084 |
| Qohestan (city) (Note: Merger of two villages) | | 3,028 | 2,322 |
| Total | 15,295 | 15,486 | 14,295 |
RD = Rural District
