= Darmian County =

County in South Khorasan province, Iran

Darmian County Persian: شهرستان درمیان
- County
- Location of Darmian County in South Khorasan province (right, pink)

- Location of South Khorasan province in Iran
- Coordinates: 32°56′N 60°06′E
- Country: Iran
- Province: South Khorasan
- Established: 2005
- Capital: Asadiyeh
- Districts: Central, Gazik, Miyandasht, Qohestan

Population (2016)
  - Total: 53,714
- Time zone: UTC+3:30 (IRST)

Darmian County (Persian: شهرستان درمیان) is in South Khorasan province, Iran. Its capital is the city of Asadiyeh.

== History ==
The villages of Qohestan and Tabas-e Masina were converted to cities in 2008, and likewise the village of Gazik in 2010.

In 2021, Fakhrrud Rural District was separated from Qohestan District, and Miyandasht Rural District from the Central District, in the formation of Miyandasht District. In addition, Nughab Rural District was established in the Central District, and Kushkak Rural District in Qohestan District.

== Demographics ==
=== Population ===
At the time of the 2006 National Census, the county's population was 51,793 in 12,893 households. The following census in 2011 counted 55,080 people in 14,433 households. The 2016 census measured the population of the county as 53,714 in 14,639 households.

=== Administrative divisions ===
Darmian County's population history and administrative structure over three consecutive censuses are shown in the following table.

Darmian County Population
Administrative Divisions	2006	2011	2016
Central District	21,409	23,822	23,550
Darmian RD	7,306	7,640	8,279
Miyandasht RD	9,791	10,378	9,811
Nughab RD (Note: Established after the 2016 census)			
Asadiyeh (city)	4,312	5,804	5,460
Gazik District	15,089	15,772	15,869
Gazik RD	6,742	4,151	4,201
Tabas-e Masina RD	8,347	4,554	4,778
Gazik (city)		2,934	2,294
Tabas-e Masina (city)		4,133	4,596
Miyandasht District			
Fakhrrud RD			
Miyandasht RD			
Qohestan District	15,295	15,486	14,295
Fakhrrud RD	5,446	5,183	4,889
Kushkak RD			
Qohestan RD	9,849	7,275	7,084
Qohestan (city) (Note: Merger of two villages)		3,028	2,322
Total	51,793	55,080	53,714
RD = Rural District

== See also ==
Media related to Darmian County at Wikimedia Commons
