= Khunik =

Khunik or Khonik (Persian: خونيك) may refer to:

- Khunik, Alqurat
- Khunik (Khong-e Bala), Baqeran
- Khunik (32°46′ N 59°22′ E), Baqeran
- Khunik (32°48′ N 59°11′ E), Baqeran
- Khunik, Darmian
- Khunik-e Baz, Darmian
- Khunik, alternate name of Khunikak, Nehbandan
- Khunik-e Olya, Nehbandan
- Khunik-e Pain, Nehbandan
- Khunik-e Bala, Qaen
- Khunik-e Pain, Qaen
- Khunik-e Pay Godar, Qaen
- Khunik-e Tajen, Qaen
- Khunik, Sarbisheh
- Khunik Zirak
- Khunik, Razavi Khorasan

== See also ==
- Khanik (disambiguation)
