= Bihud, South Khorasan =

Village in South Khorasan province, Iran

Bihud Persian: بيهود
- Village
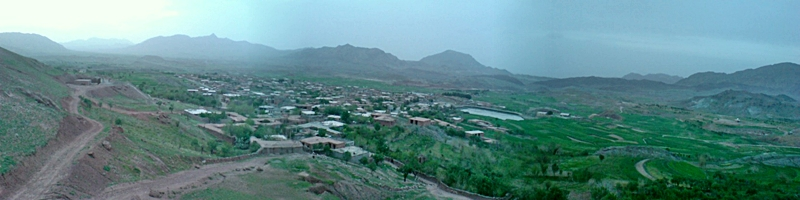
- The village of Bihud

- Location within Iran
- Coordinates: 33°46′31″N 58°51′35″E
- Country: Iran
- Province: South Khorasan
- County: Qaen
- District: Central
- Rural District: Pishkuh

Population (2016)
  - Total: 1,577
- Time zone: UTC+3:30 (IRST)
- Prefix code: +98 Iran - (0)562538 Bihud

Bihud (Persian: بيهود) (Note: Also romanized as Bīhūd) is a village in, and the capital of, Pishkuh Rural District in the Central District of Qaen County, South Khorasan province, Iran.

== Etymology ==
In Dehkhoda lexicon "bihud" means something that is yellowed or parched because of exposure to heat or fire. In Borhan lexicon, it means something that is near to fire and its color became yellowish. In Rashidi lexicon, it refers to a cloth or something that is in burning point because of fire adjacency. Some lexicographers believe that "bihud" means a charred white wood, which is half-white and half-black. This trait is visible, when the area is observed from a height, in the mountain ranges surrounding the village, which resembles this supposition. If we split it to "bi" and "hud/t" it refers to a place where fish could not survive for long time in its water.

== History ==
Bihud is a historical village with more than 2500 years of antiquity. There is no authentic document suggesting the exact ancientness of the village, but with respect to the historical places, cemeteries and the recently discovered buried stuffs it can be concluded that its antiquity goes back to pre-Islam period. These evidence shows that the village had been habituated before Islam and its people had been Zoroastrian. There are some historical citadels in the area such as Khoad, Mohalle rezvan, Alishah Bozbishe, Sarcheshmeh Grimonj and Ghaleh Now.

== Demographics ==
=== Population ===
At the time of the 2006 National Census, the village's population was 1,461 in 497 households. The following census in 2011 counted 1,785 people in 580 households. The 2016 census measured the population of the village as 1,577 people in 572 households, the most populous in its rural district.

== Geography ==
Its altitude is 1830 meters above the sea level according to. Bihud is surrounded by Gerimenj and Islamabad from north, Hashemiyeh and Tighab from south, Shendan Arab and Nughab from West and Khunik and Tajan from the east.

== Climate ==
The village has a mountainous cold-temperate climate. Hottest months are August and September, January and February has the lowest sunny days. The yearly average temperature is 14.9 ˚C and sometimes in winter, it is the coldest spot it the country. It has 100 days of frosting through the year. The average precipitation is 175 mm/year. The source of precipitations are the humid Mediterranean and Sudani streams at the end of winter and early in spring. The infiltration of Siberic streams intensely lower the temperature in the winter. The village is inclosed by a barrier of mountains, so that you can see mountains in all orientations and vista. Agriculture largely depends on amount of annual rain especially winter and spring rain because the cultivation in this area is based on drylanding and successive spring rains are necessary for this type of cultivation. Saffron is the unique agricultural product of this region which, governs the economy of the village. there are small springs around the village which are called Kalate.

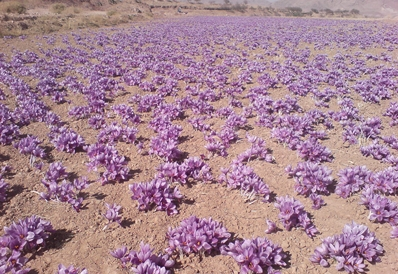
Saffron Field

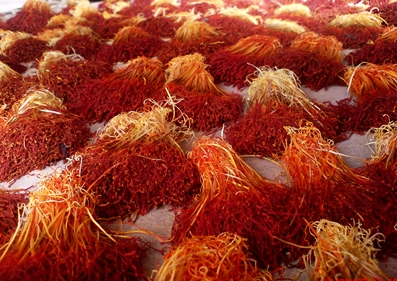
Saffron Crop

== See also ==
- Birjand
- Qaen
- Saffron
