= Deh Mir =

Deh Mir or Deh-e Mir or Deh-i-Mir (Persian: ده مير) may refer to:

- Deh-e Mir, Rudbar-e Jonubi, Kerman Province
- Deh-e Mir, Sirjan, Kerman Province
- Deh Mir, Bampur, Sistan and Baluchestan Province
- Deh-e Mir, Dalgan, Sistan and Baluchestan Province
- Deh Mir, Khusf, South Khorasan Province
- Deh-e Mir, Qaen, South Khorasan Province
