= Darreh Sefid =

Darreh Sefid (Persian: دره سفيد) may refer to:

- Darreh Sefid, Mamasani, Fars Province
- Darreh Sefid, Sepidan, Fars Province
- Darreh Sefid, South Khorasan

== See also ==
- Sefid Darreh
