= Hatamabad =

Hatamabad (Persian: حاتم آباد) may refer to:

- Hatamabad, Chaharmahal and Bakhtiari
- Hatamabad, Hamadan
- Hatamabad, Delfan, Lorestan Province
- Hatamabad, Selseleh, Lorestan Province
- Hatamabad, Markazi
- Hatamabad, South Khorasan
