= Chedan =

Chedan چدان
- Village
- Location within Iran
- Coordinates: 33°38′39″N 59°01′51″E
- Country: Iran
- Province: South Khorasan
- County: Qaen
- Bakhsh: Central
- Rural District: Qaen

Population (2006)
  - Total: 189
- Time zone: UTC+3:30 (IRST)
  - Summer (DST): UTC+4:30 (IRDT)

Chedan (Persian: چدان, also Romanized as Chedān; also known as Chedān-e Bālā) is a village in Qaen Rural District, in the Central District of Qaen County, South Khorasan Province, Iran. At the 2006 census, its population was 189, in 44 families.
