= Fandokht-e Jadid =

Village in South Khorasan province, Iran

Fandokht-e Jadid Persian: فندخت جديد
- Village
- Location within Iran
- Coordinates: 33°47′28″N 59°53′45″E
- Country: Iran
- Province: South Khorasan
- County: Zirkuh
- District: Shaskuh
- Rural District: Bohnabad

Population (2016)
  - Total: 1,665
- Time zone: UTC+3:30 (IRST)

Fandokht-e Jadid (Persian: فندخت جديد) (Note: Also romanized as Fandokht-e Jadīd; also known as Fandokht and Findūkht) is a village in Bohnabad Rural District of Shaskuh District in Zirkuh County, South Khorasan province, Iran.

== Demographics ==
=== Population ===
At the time of the 2006 National Census, the village's population was 1,431 in 330 households, when it was in Shaskuh Rural District of the former Zirkuh District in Qaen County. The following census in 2011 counted 1,594 people in 409 households. The 2016 census measured the population of the village as 1,665 people in 463 households, by which time the district had been separated from the county in the establishment of Zirkuh County. The rural district was transferred to the new Shaskuh District, and the village was transferred to Bohnabad Rural District created in the same district. Fandokht-e Jadid was the most populous village in its rural district.
