= Bonarg =

Bonarg بنرگ
- Village
- Location within Iran
- Coordinates: 33°53′33″N 58°46′59″E
- Country: Iran
- Province: South Khorasan
- County: Qaen
- Bakhsh: Nimbeluk
- Rural District: Nimbeluk

Population (2006)
  - Total: 81
- Time zone: UTC+3:30 (IRST)
  - Summer (DST): UTC+4:30 (IRDT)

Bonarg (Persian: بنرگ, also Romanized as Bonrak and Bownark; also known as Būnzak) is a village in Nimbeluk Rural District, Nimbeluk District, Qaen County, South Khorasan Province, Iran. At the 2006 census, its population was 81, in 31 families.
