= Cheshmeh Bid =

Cheshmeh Bid (Persian: چشمه بيد) may refer to:

- Cheshmeh Bid, Lorestan
- Cheshmeh Bid, South Khorasan
- Cheshmeh Bid Cheng Baradeh, Lorestan Province
