= Mahyar =

Mahyar (Persian مهیار) is a Persian word and may refer to:

== Given name ==
- Mahyar Alizadeh (born 1982), Iranian musician
- Mahyar Amouzegar, Iranian-American academic
- Mahyar Dean, Iranian musician
- Mahyar Hassan-Nejad (born 1985), Iranian footballer
- Mahyar Jabbari (born 1998), Iranian footballer
- Mahyar Monshipour (born 1975), French-Iranian boxer
- Mahyar Sedaghat (born 1996), Iranian sport shooter
- Mahyar Zahmatkesh (born 1993), Iranian football

== Middle name ==
- Amir Mahyar Tafreshipour (born 1974), Iranian-Danish composer

== Places ==
- Mahyar, Isfahan, Iran
- Mahyar, South Khorasan, Iran
- Mahyar Rural District, in Iran
