= Shir Maghz-e Pain =

Shir Maghz-e Pain شيرمغزپائين
- Village
- Location within Iran
- Coordinates: 34°04′04″N 59°14′18″E
- Country: Iran
- Province: South Khorasan
- County: Qaen
- Bakhsh: Nimbeluk
- Rural District: Nimbeluk

Population (2006)
  - Total: 13
- Time zone: UTC+3:30 (IRST)
  - Summer (DST): UTC+4:30 (IRDT)

Shir Maghz-e Pain (Persian: شيرمغزپائين, also Romanized as Shīr Maghz-e Pā’īn) is a village in Nimbeluk Rural District, Nimbeluk District, Qaen County, South Khorasan Province, Iran. At the 2006 census, its population was 13, in 4 families.
