= Khanaq =

Khanaq (Persian: خنیک) may refer to:

- Khanaq, alternate name of Khunik-e Pay Godar
- Khanaq-e Bala
- Khanaq-e Pain
