= Karizan-e Sofla =

Village in South Khorasan province, Iran

Karizan-e Sofla Persian: كريزان سفلي
- Village
- Location within Iran
- Coordinates: 33°53′24″N 59°48′49″E
- Country: Iran
- Province: South Khorasan
- County: Zirkuh
- District: Shaskuh
- Rural District: Bohnabad

Population (2016)
  - Total: 1,665
- Time zone: UTC+3:30 (IRST)

Karizan-e Sofla (Persian: كريزان سفلي) (Note: Also romanized as Kārīzān-e Soflá) is a village in Bohnabad Rural District of Shaskuh District in Zirkuh County, South Khorasan province, Iran.

== Demographics ==
=== Population ===
At the time of the 2006 National Census, the village's population was 339 in 70 households, when it was in Shaskuh Rural District of the former Zirkuh District in Qaen County. The following census in 2011 counted 349 people in 88 households. The 2016 census measured the population of the village as 373 people in 104 households, by which time the district had been separated from the county in the establishment of Zirkuh County. The rural district was transferred to the new Shaskuh District, and the village was transferred to Bohnabad Rural District created in the same district.
