= Bahmanabad-e Jadid =

Village in South Khorasan province, Iran

Bahmanabad-e Jadid Persian: بهمن اباد جديد
- Village
- Location within Iran
- Country: Iran
- Province: South Khorasan
- County: Zirkuh
- District: Shaskuh
- Rural District: Bohnabad

Population (2016)
  - Total: 1,654
- Time zone: UTC+3:30 (IRST)

Bahmanabad-e Jadid (بهمن اباد جديد) (Note: Also romanized as Bahmanābād-e Jadīd; also known as Bahmanābād) is a village in, and the capital of, Bohnabad Rural District in Shaskuh District of Zirkuh County, South Khorasan province, Iran.

== Demographics ==
=== Population ===
At the time of the 2006 National Census, the village's population was 1,226 in 269 households, when it was in Shaskuh Rural District of the former Zirkuh District in Qaen County. The following census in 2011 counted 1,318 people in 334 households. The 2016 census measured the population of the village as 1,654 people in 450 households, by which time the district had been separated from the county in the establishment of Zirkuh County. The rural district was transferred to the new Shaskuh District, and Bahmanabad-e Jadid was transferred to Bohnabad Rural District created in the same district.
