= Chah Jamali =

Chah Jamali چاه جملي
- Village
- Location within Iran
- Coordinates: 34°03′51″N 59°08′49″E
- Country: Iran
- Province: South Khorasan
- County: Qaen
- Bakhsh: Nimbeluk
- Rural District: Nimbeluk

Population (2006)
  - Total: 41
- Time zone: UTC+3:30 (IRST)
  - Summer (DST): UTC+4:30 (IRDT)

Chah Jamali (Persian: چاه جملي, also Romanized as Chāh Jamalī) is a village in Nimbeluk Rural District, Nimbeluk District, Qaen County, South Khorasan Province, Iran. At the 2006 census, its population was 41, in 9 families.
