= Rajang, Iran =

Rajang رجنگ
- Village
- Location within Iran
- Coordinates: 34°04′31″N 59°12′07″E
- Country: Iran
- Province: South Khorasan
- County: Qaen
- Bakhsh: Nimbeluk
- Rural District: Nimbeluk

Population (2006)
  - Total: 79
- Time zone: UTC+3:30 (IRST)
  - Summer (DST): UTC+4:30 (IRDT)

Rajang (Persian: رجنگ; also known as Rajīng) is a village in Nimbeluk Rural District, Nimbeluk District, Qaen County, South Khorasan Province, Iran. At the 2006 census, its population was 79, in 20 families.
