= Shahrak-e Chah Payab Chah Shatt =

Village in South Khorasan province, Iran

Shahrak-e Chah Payab Chah Shatt Persian: شهركچاه پاياب چاه شط
- Village
- Location within Iran
- Coordinates: 33°51′51″N 60°03′13″E
- Country: Iran
- Province: South Khorasan
- County: Zirkuh
- District: Shaskuh
- Rural District: Bohnabad

Population (2016)
  - Total: 300
- Time zone: UTC+3:30 (IRST)

Shahrak-e Chah Payab Chah Shatt (Persian: شهركچاه پاياب چاه شط) (Note: Also romanized as Shahraḵ-e Chāh Pāyāb Chāh Shatṭ; also known as Chāh Pāyāb, Chakpāi Āb, and Hemmatabad) is a village in Bohnabad Rural District of Shaskuh District in Zirkuh County, South Khorasan province, Iran.

== Demographics ==
=== Population ===
At the time of the 2006 National Census, the village's population was 312 in 76 households, when it was in Shaskuh Rural District of the former Zirkuh District in Qaen County. The following census in 2011 counted 316 people in 76 households. The 2016 census measured the population of the village as 300 people in 82 households, by which time the district had been separated from the county in the establishment of Zirkuh County. The rural district was transferred to the new Shaskuh District, and the village was transferred to Bohnabad Rural District created in the same district.
