= Abbasabad, Nimbeluk =

Abbasabad عباس اباد
- Village
- Location within Iran
- Coordinates: 34°06′13″N 59°02′21″E
- Country: Iran
- Province: South Khorasan
- County: Qaen
- Bakhsh: Nimbeluk
- Rural District: Nimbeluk

Population (2006)
  - Total: 139
- Time zone: UTC+3:30 (IRST)
  - Summer (DST): UTC+4:30 (IRDT)

Abbasabad (Persian: عباس اباد, also Romanized as ‘Abbāsābād) is a village in Nimbeluk Rural District, Nimbeluk District, Qaen County, South Khorasan Province, Iran. At the 2006 census, its population was 139, in 36 families.
