= Shahrak-e Bidokht =

Village in South Khorasan province, Iran

Shahrak-e Bidokht Persian: شهرک بيدخت
- Village
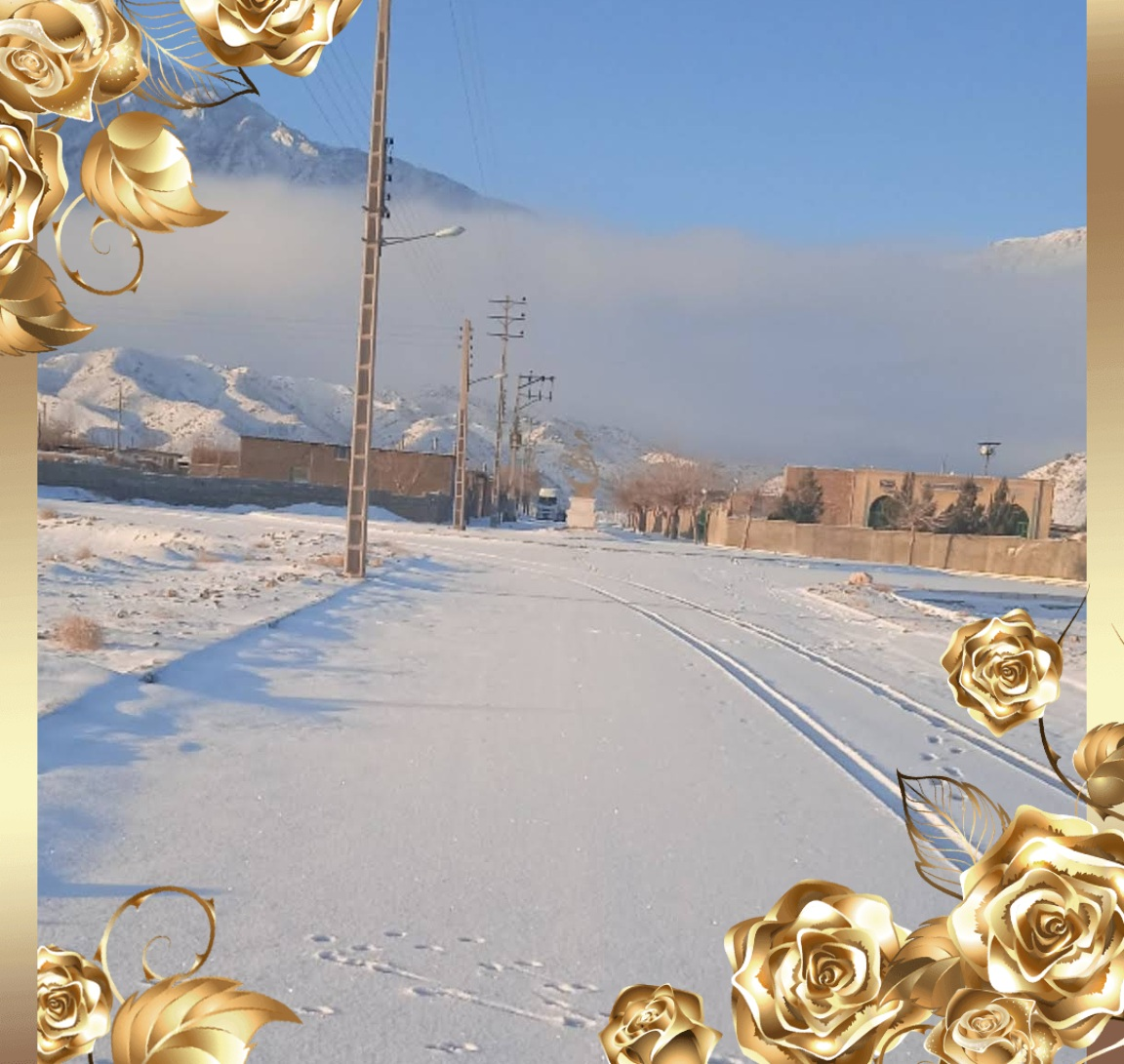
- Central street of Shahrak-e Bidokht, Zirkuh County

- Location within Iran
- Coordinates: 33°48′46″N 59°52′51″E
- Country: Iran
- Province: South Khorasan
- County: Zirkuh
- District: Shaskuh
- Rural District: Bohnabad

Population (2016)
  - Total: 225
- Time zone: UTC+3:30 (IRST)

Shahrak-e Bidokht (Persian: شهرك بيدخت) (Note: Also romanized as Shahraḵ-e Bīdokht; also known as Beydokht and Bīdokht, also romanized as Bidokht) is a village in Bohnabad Rural District of Shaskuh District in Zirkuh County, South Khorasan province, Iran. Among the famous souvenirs of this village are saffron, barberry, jujube, and apricot.

== Demographics ==
=== Population ===
At the time of the 2006 National Census, the village's population was 197 in 43 households, when it was in Shaskuh Rural District of the former Zirkuh District in Qaen County. The following census in 2011 counted 219 people in 48 households. The 2016 census measured the population of the village as 225 people in 56 households, by which time the district had been separated from the county in the establishment of Zirkuh County. The rural district was transferred to the new Shaskuh District, and the village was transferred to Bohnabad Rural District created in the same district.
