= Khorvaj =

Khorvaj خرواج
- Village
- Location within Iran
- Coordinates: 33°35′11″N 59°10′20″E
- Country: Iran
- Province: South Khorasan
- County: Qaen
- Bakhsh: Central
- Rural District: Qaen

Population (2006)
  - Total: 101
- Time zone: UTC+3:30 (IRST)
  - Summer (DST): UTC+4:30 (IRDT)

Khorvaj (Persian: خرواج, also Romanized as Khorvāj, Kharvāj, Khūrvaj, and Khurwāj) is a village in Qaen Rural District, in the Central District of Qaen County, South Khorasan Province, Iran. At the 2006 census, its population was 101, in 31 families.
