= Now Deh, Zirkuh =

Village in South Khorasan province, Iran

Now Deh Persian: نوده
- Village
- Location within Iran
- Coordinates: 33°39′36″N 59°57′39″E
- Country: Iran
- Province: South Khorasan
- County: Zirkuh
- District: Shaskuh
- Rural District: Shaskuh

Population (2016)
  - Total: 188
- Time zone: UTC+3:30 (IRST)

Now Deh (Persian: نوده) (Note: Also known as Kalāt-e Nowdeh, Kalāteh Naudeh, Kalateh-i-Naudeh, Kalāteh-ye Nowdeh, Kalāteh-ye Nūdeh, and Kūh-e Nowdeh) is a village in Shaskuh Rural District of Shaskuh District in Zirkuh County, South Khorasan province, Iran.

== Demographics ==
=== Population ===
At the time of the 2006 National Census, the village's population was 160 in 41 households, when it was in the former Zirkuh District of Qaen County. The following census in 2011 counted 170 people in 47 households. The 2016 census measured the population of the village as 188 people in 54 households, by which time the district had been separated from the county in the establishment of Zirkuh County. The rural district was transferred to the new Shaskuh District.
