= Zirach =

Zirach may refer to:

- Ziraj, Birjand County, South Khorasan Province, Iran
- Zirenj, Qaen County, South Khorasan Province, Iran
