= Shendan =

Shendan may refer to:

- Shendan Expressway, in China
- Shendan, South Khorasan, a village in Iran
