= Mozdabad =

Village in South Khorasan province, Iran

Mozdabad Persian: مزداباد
- Village
- Location within Iran
- Coordinates: 34°00′40″N 58°41′19″E
- Country: Iran
- Province: South Khorasan
- County: Qaen
- District: Nimbeluk
- Rural District: Nimbeluk

Population (2016)
  - Total: 164
- Time zone: UTC+3:30 (IRST)

Mozdabad (Persian: مزداباد) (Note: Also romanized as Mozdābād) is a village in Nimbeluk Rural District of Nimbeluk District in Qaen County, South Khorasan province, Iran.

== Demographics ==
=== Population ===
At the time of the 2006 National Census, the village's population was 249 in 82 households. The following census in 2011 counted 222 people in 84 households. The 2016 census measured the population of the village as 164 people in 70 households.
