= Khug =

Village in South Khorasan province, Iran

Khug Persian: خوگ
- Village
- Location within Iran
- Coordinates: 33°54′25″N 58°46′15″E
- Country: Iran
- Province: South Khorasan
- County: Qaen
- District: Nimbeluk
- Rural District: Nimbeluk

Population (2016)
  - Total: 217
- Time zone: UTC+3:30 (IRST)

Khug (Persian: خوگ) (Note: Also romanized as Khūg; also known as Khūk and Khūkī) is a village in Nimbeluk Rural District of Nimbeluk District in Qaen County, South Khorasan province, Iran.

== Demographics ==
=== Population ===
At the time of the 2006 National Census, the village's population was 291 in 75 households. The following census in 2011 counted 277 people in 66 households. The 2016 census measured the population of the village as 217 people in 66 households.
