= Pahnai =

Village in South Khorasan province, Iran

Pahnai Persian: پهنايي
- Village
- Location within Iran
- Coordinates: 33°38′55″N 59°07′31″E
- Country: Iran
- Province: South Khorasan
- County: Qaen
- District: Central
- Rural District: Qaen

Population (2016)
  - Total: 2,442
- Time zone: UTC+3:30 (IRST)

Pahnai (Persian: پهنايي) (Note: Also romanized as Pahnā’ī; also known as Pānāi and Pānāy) is a village in Qaen Rural District of the Central District in Qaen County, South Khorasan province, Iran.

== Demographics ==
=== Population ===
At the time of the 2006 National Census, the village's population was 1,776 in 465 households. The following census in 2011 counted 2,187 people in 675 households. The 2016 census measured the population of the village as 2,442 people in 743 households.
