= Tigab =

Village in South Khorasan province, Iran

Tigab Persian: تيگاب
- Village
- Location within Iran
- Coordinates: 33°51′28″N 59°44′12″E
- Country: Iran
- Province: South Khorasan
- County: Qaen
- District: Central
- Rural District: Qaen

Population (2016)
  - Total: 660
- Time zone: UTC+3:30 (IRST)

Tigab (Persian: تيگاب) (Note: Also romanized as Tīgāb; also known as Tīgh Āb) is a village in Qaen Rural District of the Central District in Qaen County, South Khorasan province, Iran.

== Demographics ==
=== Population ===
At the time of the 2006 National Census, the village's population was 630 in 146 households. The following census in 2011 counted 624 people in 170 households. The 2016 census measured the population of the village as 660 people in 175 households.
