= Gazneshk =

Village in South Khorasan province, Iran

Gazneshk Persian: گزنشك
- Village
- Location within Iran
- Coordinates: 33°49′32″N 58°43′47″E
- Country: Iran
- Province: South Khorasan
- County: Qaen
- District: Nimbeluk
- Rural District: Karghond

Population (2016)
  - Total: 599
- Time zone: UTC+3:30 (IRST)

Gazneshk (Persian: گزنشك) (Note: Also romanized as Gazenshak; also known as Gaznishk) is a village in Karghond Rural District of Nimbeluk District in Qaen County, South Khorasan province, Iran.

== Demographics ==
=== Population ===
At the time of the 2006 National Census, the village's population was 544 in 134 households. The following census in 2011 counted 606 people in 171 households. The 2016 census measured the population of the village as 599 people in 180 households.
