= Khonj, South Khorasan =

Village in South Khorasan province, Iran

Khonj Persian: خنج
- Village
- Location within Iran
- Coordinates: 33°51′09″N 58°41′14″E
- Country: Iran
- Province: South Khorasan
- County: Qaen
- District: Nimbeluk
- Rural District: Karghond

Population (2016)
  - Total: 201
- Time zone: UTC+3:30 (IRST)

Khonj (Persian: خنج) (Note: Also romanized as Khanj; also known as Khownj and Khūnj) is a village in Karghond Rural District of Nimbeluk District in Qaen County, South Khorasan province, Iran.

== Demographics ==
=== Population ===
At the time of the 2006 National Census, the village's population was 209 in 68 households. The following census in 2011 counted 213 people in 69 households. The 2016 census measured the population of the village as 201 people in 72 households.
