= Deheshk, South Khorasan =

Village in South Khorasan province, Iran

Deheshk Persian: دهشك
- Village
- Location within Iran
- Coordinates: 33°54′53″N 58°50′24″E
- Country: Iran
- Province: South Khorasan
- County: Qaen
- District: Nimbeluk
- Rural District: Nimbeluk

Population (2016)
  - Total: 1,597
- Time zone: UTC+3:30 (IRST)

Deheshk (Persian: دهشك) (Note: Also known as Dehishk) is a village in Nimbeluk Rural District of Nimbeluk District in Qaen County, South Khorasan province, Iran.

== Demographics ==
=== Population ===
At the time of the 2006 National Census, the village's population was 1,264 in 367 households. The following census in 2011 counted 1,285 people in 372 households. The 2016 census measured the population of the village as 1,597 people in 491 households, the most populous in its rural district.
