= Boz Bisheh =

Village in South Khorasan province, Iran

Boz Bisheh Persian: بزبيشه
- Village
- Location within Iran
- Coordinates: 33°48′26″N 58°54′30″E
- Country: Iran
- Province: South Khorasan
- County: Qaen
- District: Central
- Rural District: Pishkuh

Population (2016)
  - Total: 105
- Time zone: UTC+3:30 (IRST)

Boz Bisheh (Persian: بزبيشه) (Note: Also romanized as Boz Bīsheh; also known as Buz Bishah) is a village in Pishkuh Rural District of the Central District in Qaen County, South Khorasan province, Iran.

== Demographics ==
=== Population ===
At the time of the 2006 National Census, the village's population was 167 in 53 households. The following census in 2011 counted 227 people in 74 households. The 2016 census measured the population of the village as 105 people in 46 households.
