= Varezg =

Village in South Khorasan province, Iran

Varezg Persian: وارزگ
- Village
- Location within Iran
- Coordinates: 33°41′58″N 59°20′51″E
- Country: Iran
- Province: South Khorasan
- County: Qaen
- District: Central
- Rural District: Qaen

Population (2016)
  - Total: 710
- Time zone: UTC+3:30 (IRST)

Varezg (Persian: وارزگ) (Note: Also romanized as Vārezg; also known as Vārīz, Vārzan, Verezg (ورزگ), Verzeg, Vorzg, and Wārīz) is a village in Qaen Rural District of the Central District in Qaen County, South Khorasan province, Iran.

== Demographics ==
=== Population ===
At the time of the 2006 National Census, the village's population was 586 in 169 households. The following census in 2011 counted 519 people in 186 households. The 2016 census measured the population of the village as 710 people in 241 households.
