= Darreh Sefid, South Khorasan =

Darreh Sefid دره سفيد
- Village
- Location within Iran
- Coordinates: 34°01′09″N 59°13′31″E
- Country: Iran
- Province: South Khorasan
- County: Qaen
- Bakhsh: Central
- Rural District: Mahyar

Population (2006)
  - Total: 82
- Time zone: UTC+3:30 (IRST)
  - Summer (DST): UTC+4:30 (IRDT)

Darreh Sefid (Persian: دره سفيد; also known as Dar Sefīd) is a village in Mahyar Rural District, in the Central District of Qaen County, South Khorasan Province, Iran. At the 2006 census, its population was 82, in 16 families.
