= Astand-e Jadid =

Village in South Khorasan province, Iran

Astand-e Jadid Persian: استندجديد
- Village
- Location within Iran
- Coordinates: 33°51′14″N 59°50′00″E
- Country: Iran
- Province: South Khorasan
- County: Zirkuh
- District: Shaskuh
- Rural District: Bohnabad

Population (2016)
  - Total: 1,100
- Time zone: UTC+3:30 (IRST)

Astand-e Jadid (Persian: استندجديد) (Note: Also romanized as Astand-e Jadīd; also known as Astand, Estend and Istind) is a village in Bohnabad Rural District of Shaskuh District in Zirkuh County, South Khorasan province, Iran.

== Demographics ==
=== Population ===
At the time of the 2006 National Census, the village's population was 961 in 221 households, when it was in Shaskuh Rural District of the former Zirkuh District in Qaen County. The following census in 2011 counted 1,025 people in 278 households. The 2016 census measured the population of the village as 1,100 people in 319 households, by which time the district had been separated from the county in the establishment of Zirkuh County. The rural district was transferred to the new Shaskuh District, and the village was transferred to Bohnabad Rural District created in the same district.
