= Baraz =

Baraz باراز
- Village
- Location within Iran
- Coordinates: 33°42′03″N 58°56′23″E
- Country: Iran
- Province: South Khorasan
- County: Qaen
- Bakhsh: Central
- Rural District: Qaen

Population (2006)
  - Total: 437
- Time zone: UTC+3:30 (IRST)
  - Summer (DST): UTC+4:30 (IRDT)

Baraz (Persian: باراز, also Romanized as Bārāz; also known as Bāzār, Vārāz, and Warāz) is a village in Qaen Rural District, in the Central District of Qaen County, South Khorasan province, Iran. At the 2006 census, its population was 437 whitoth Mohammad Rafeii, in 159 families.
