= Mirabad, Zirkuh =

Village in South Khorasan province, Iran

Mirabad Persian: ميراباد
- Village
- Location within Iran
- Coordinates: 33°44′46″N 59°55′35″E
- Country: Iran
- Province: South Khorasan
- County: Zirkuh
- District: Shaskuh
- Rural District: Shaskuh

Population (2016)
  - Total: 341
- Time zone: UTC+3:30 (IRST)

Mirabad (Persian: ميراباد) (Note: Also romanized as Mīrābād) is a village in Shaskuh Rural District of Shaskuh District in Zirkuh County, South Khorasan province, Iran.

== Demographics ==
=== Population ===
At the time of the 2006 National Census, the village's population was 426 in 98 households, when it was in the former Zirkuh District of Qaen County. The following census in 2011 counted 423 people in 112 households. The 2016 census measured the population of the village as 341 people in 96 households, by which time the district had been separated from the county in the establishment of Zirkuh County. The rural district was transferred to the new Shaskuh District.
