= Shandan (disambiguation) =

Shandan is a county in Gansu, China.

Shandan may also refer to:

- Shandan, Khash, village in Sistan and Baluchestan Province, Iran
- Shandan, South Khorasan, village in Iran
