= Kareshk, South Khorasan =

Village in South Khorasan province, Iran

Kareshk Persian: كارشك
- Village
- Location within Iran
- Coordinates: 34°02′16″N 58°43′00″E
- Country: Iran
- Province: South Khorasan
- County: Qaen
- District: Nimbeluk
- Rural District: Nimbeluk

Population (2016)
  - Total: 215
- Time zone: UTC+3:30 (IRST)

Kareshk (Persian: كارشك) (Note: Also romanized as Kāreshk; also known as Barīshk, Barishk, and Boreshk) is a village in Nimbeluk Rural District of Nimbeluk District in Qaen County, South Khorasan province, Iran.

== Demographics ==
=== Population ===
At the time of the 2006 National Census, the village's population was 256 in 94 households. The following census in 2011 counted 168 people in 70 households. The 2016 census measured the population of the village as 215 people in 87 households.
