= Makarom-e Bala =

Makarom-e Bala مكارم بالا
- Village
- Location within Iran
- Coordinates: 34°00′00″N 59°17′24″E
- Country: Iran
- Province: South Khorasan
- County: Qaen
- Bakhsh: Central
- Rural District: Mahyar

Population (2006)
  - Total: 41
- Time zone: UTC+3:30 (IRST)
  - Summer (DST): UTC+4:30 (IRDT)

Makarom-e Bala (Persian: مكارم بالا, also Romanized as Maḵārom-e Bālā; also known as Maḵārom) is a village in Mahyar Rural District, in the Central District of Qaen County, South Khorasan Province, Iran. At the 2006 census, its population was 41, in 11 families.
