= Kalateh-ye Sari =

Village in South Khorasan province, Iran

Kalateh-ye Sari Persian: كلاته سري
- Village
- Location within Iran
- Coordinates: 33°51′04″N 58°43′57″E
- Country: Iran
- Province: South Khorasan
- County: Qaen
- District: Nimbeluk
- Rural District: Karghond

Population (2016)
  - Total: 335
- Time zone: UTC+3:30 (IRST)

Kalateh-ye Sari (Persian: كلاته سري) (Note: Also romanized as Kalāteh Sarī and Kalāteh-ye Sarī; also known as Sarī) is a village in Karghond Rural District of Nimbeluk District in Qaen County, South Khorasan province, Iran.

== Demographics ==
=== Population ===
At the time of the 2006 National Census, the village's population was 476 in 143 households. The following census in 2011 counted 427 people in 134 households. The 2016 census measured the population of the village as 335 people in 121 households.
