= Khorramabad, Qaen =

Village in South Khorasan province, Iran

Khorramabad Persian: خرم اباد
- Village
- Location within Iran
- Coordinates: 33°58′51″N 59°25′27″E
- Country: Iran
- Province: South Khorasan
- County: Qaen
- District: Central
- Rural District: Mahyar

Population (2016)
  - Total: 311
- Time zone: UTC+3:30 (IRST)

Khorramabad (Persian: خرم اباد) (Note: Also romanized as Khorramābād) is a village in Mahyar Rural District of the Central District in Qaen County, South Khorasan province, Iran.

== Demographics ==
=== Population ===
At the time of the 2006 National Census, the village's population was 309 in 69 households. The following census in 2011 counted 291 people in 77 households. The 2016 census measured the population of the village as 311 people in 86 households.
