= Khunik-e Pain =

Khunik-e Pain (Persian: خونيك پائين) may refer to:

- Khunik-e Pain, Nehbandan
- Khunik-e Pain, Qaen
