= Khoshkan =

Village in South Khorasan province, Iran

Khoshkan Persian: خشكان
- Village
- Location within Iran
- Coordinates: 33°48′50″N 58°43′26″E
- Country: Iran
- Province: South Khorasan
- County: Qaen
- District: Nimbeluk
- Rural District: Karghond

Population (2016)
  - Total: 272
- Time zone: UTC+3:30 (IRST)

Khoshkan (Persian: خشكان) (Note: Also romanized as Khoshkān; also known as Khoshkkan and Khoshkkān) is a village in Karghond Rural District of Nimbeluk District in Qaen County, South Khorasan province, Iran.

== Demographics ==
=== Population ===
At the time of the 2006 National Census, the village's population was 275 in 71 households. The following census in 2011 counted 323 people in 87 households. The 2016 census measured the population of the village as 272 people in 84 households.
