= Garmab, South Khorasan =

Village in South Khorasan province, Iran

Garmab Persian: گرماب
- Village
- Location within Iran
- Coordinates: 33°52′54″N 59°42′17″E
- Country: Iran
- Province: South Khorasan
- County: Qaen
- District: Central
- Rural District: Qaen

Population (2016)
  - Total: 906
- Time zone: UTC+3:30 (IRST)

Garmab (Persian: گرماب) (Note: Also romanized as Garmāb) is a village in Qaen Rural District of the Central District in Qaen County, South Khorasan province, Iran.

== Demographics ==
=== Population ===
At the time of the 2006 National Census, the village's population was 735 in 155 households. The following census in 2011 counted 875 people in 212 households. The 2016 census measured the population of the village as 906 people in 254 households.
