= Khunik-e Tajan =

Village in South Khorasan province, Iran

Khunik-e Tajan Persian: خونيك تجن
- Village
- Location within Iran
- Coordinates: 33°44′05″N 58°55′06″E
- Country: Iran
- Province: South Khorasan
- County: Qaen
- District: Central
- Rural District: Pishkuh

Population (2016)
  - Total: 166
- Time zone: UTC+3:30 (IRST)

Khunik-e Tajan (Persian: خونيك تجن) (Note: Also romanized as Khūnīk-e Tajan, Khunik-e Tajen, and Khūnīk-e Tajen) is a village in Pishkuh Rural District of the Central District in Qaen County, South Khorasan province, Iran.

== Demographics ==
=== Population ===
At the time of the 2006 National Census, the village's population was 206 in 41 households, when it was in Qaen Rural District. The following census in 2011 counted 158 people in 57 households. The 2016 census measured the population of the village as 166 people in 61 households, by which time the village had been transferred to Pishkuh Rural District
