= Kharmenj =

Village in South Khorasan province, Iran

Kharmenj Persian: خرمنج
- Village
- Location within Iran
- Coordinates: 33°49′08″N 58°44′21″E
- Country: Iran
- Province: South Khorasan
- County: Qaen
- District: Nimbeluk
- Rural District: Karghond

Population (2016)
  - Total: 309
- Time zone: UTC+3:30 (IRST)

Kharmenj (Persian: خرمنج) (Note: Also romanized as Khar Menj; also known as Faz̤elābād (فضل اباد) and Kharmin) is a village in Karghond Rural District of Nimbeluk District in Qaen County, South Khorasan province, Iran.

== Demographics ==
=== Population ===
At the time of the 2006 National Census, the village's population was 318 in 98 households. The following census in 2011 counted 369 people in 105 households. The 2016 census measured the population of the village as 309 people in 105 households.
