= Boznabad-e Jadid =

Village in South Khorasan province, Iran

Boznabad-e Jadid Persian: بزن ابادجديد
- Village
- Location within Iran
- Coordinates: 33°58′18″N 59°24′57″E
- Country: Iran
- Province: South Khorasan
- County: Qaen
- District: Central
- Rural District: Mahyar

Population (2016)
  - Total: 487
- Time zone: UTC+3:30 (IRST)

Boznabad-e Jadid (Persian: بزن ابادجديد) (Note: Also romanized as Boznābād-e Jadīd; also known as Boznābād, Būznābād, and Buznābād) is a village in Mahyar Rural District of the Central District in Qaen County, South Khorasan province, Iran.

== Demographics ==
=== Population ===
At the time of the 2006 National Census, the village's population was 549 in 139 households. The following census in 2011 counted 569 people in 146 households. The 2016 census measured the population of the village as 487 people in 147 households.
