= Esfad-e Jadid =

Village in South Khorasan province, Iran

Esfad-e Jadid Persian: اسفادجديد
- Village
- Location within Iran
- Coordinates: 33°44′03″N 59°56′26″E
- Country: Iran
- Province: South Khorasan
- County: Zirkuh
- District: Shaskuh
- Rural District: Shaskuh

Population (2016)
  - Total: 629
- Time zone: UTC+3:30 (IRST)

Esfad-e Jadid (Persian: اسفادجديد) (Note: Also romanized as Esfād-e Jadīd; also known as Esfād) is a village in Shaskuh Rural District of Shaskuh District in Zirkuh County, South Khorasan province, Iran.

== Demographics ==
=== Population ===
At the time of the 2006 National Census, the village's population was 628 in 172 households, when it was in the former Zirkuh District of Qaen County. The following census in 2011 counted 634 people in 208 households. The 2016 census measured the population of the village as 629 people in 221 households, by which time the district had been separated from the county in the establishment of Zirkuh County. The rural district was transferred to the new Shaskuh District.
