= Shir Morgh =

Village in South Khorasan province, Iran

Shir Morgh Persian: شيرمرغ
- Village
- Location within Iran
- Coordinates: 33°46′10″N 59°04′16″E
- Country: Iran
- Province: South Khorasan
- County: Qaen
- District: Central
- Rural District: Qaen

Population (2016)
  - Total: 615
- Time zone: UTC+3:30 (IRST)

Shir Morgh (Persian: شيرمرغ) (Note: Also romanized as Shīr Morgh) is a village in Qaen Rural District of the Central District in Qaen County, South Khorasan province, Iran.

== Demographics ==
=== Population ===
At the time of the 2006 National Census, the village's population was 571 in 149 households. The following census in 2011 counted 598 people in 164 households. The 2016 census measured the population of the village as 615 people in 175 households.
