= Tajan, South Khorasan =

Village in South Khorasan province, Iran

Tajan Persian: تجن
- Village
- Location within Iran
- Coordinates: 33°43′27″N 58°54′43″E
- Country: Iran
- Province: South Khorasan
- County: Qaen
- District: Central
- Rural District: Pishkuh

Population (2016)
  - Total: 380
- Time zone: UTC+3:30 (IRST)

Tajan (Persian: تجن) (Note: Also known as Tāji) is a village in Pishkuh Rural District of the Central District in Qaen County, South Khorasan province, Iran.

== Demographics ==
=== Population ===
At the time of the 2006 National Census, the village's population was 447 in 126 households, when it was in Qaen Rural District. The following census in 2011 counted 393 people in 122 households. The 2016 census measured the population of the village as 380 people in 132 households, by which time the village had been transferred to Pishkuh Rural District
