= Chenaran-e Jadid =

Village in South Khorasan province, Iran

Chenaran-e Jadid Persian: چناران جديد
- Village
- Location within Iran
- Coordinates: 33°38′46″N 59°58′07″E
- Country: Iran
- Province: South Khorasan
- County: Zirkuh
- District: Shaskuh
- Rural District: Shaskuh

Population (2016)
  - Total: 148
- Time zone: UTC+3:30 (IRST)

Chenaran-e Jadid (Persian: چناران جديد) (Note: Also romanized as Chenārān-e Jadīd; also known as Chenārān, Kalāt-e Chenārān, and Kalāteh-i-Chinārān) is a village in Shaskuh Rural District of Shaskuh District in Zirkuh County, South Khorasan province, Iran.

== Demographics ==
=== Population ===
At the time of the 2006 National Census, the village's population was 140 in 32 households, when it was in the former Zirkuh District of Qaen County. The following census in 2011 counted 150 people in 45 households. The 2016 census measured the population of the village as 148 people in 44 households, by which time the district had been separated from the county in the establishment of Zirkuh County. The rural district was transferred to the new Shaskuh District.
