= Darreh-ye Baz =

Village in South Khorasan province, Iran

Darreh-ye Baz Persian: دره باز
- Village
- Location within Iran
- Coordinates: 33°52′44″N 58°39′55″E
- Country: Iran
- Province: South Khorasan
- County: Qaen
- District: Nimbeluk
- Rural District: Karghond

Population (2016)
  - Total: 218
- Time zone: UTC+3:30 (IRST)

Darreh-ye Baz (Persian: دره باز) (Note: Also romanized as Darreh Bāz, Darreh-i-Bāz, and Darreh-ye Bāz) is a village in Karghond Rural District of Nimbeluk District in Qaen County, South Khorasan province, Iran.

== Demographics ==
=== Population ===
At the time of the 2006 National Census, the village's population was 257 in 68 households. The following census in 2011 counted 251 people in 71 households. The 2016 census measured the population of the village as 218 people in 69 households.
