= Jabbar, South Khorasan =

Village in South Khorasan province, Iran

Jabbar Persian: جبار
- Village
- Location within Iran
- Coordinates: 34°00′07″N 59°20′03″E
- Country: Iran
- Province: South Khorasan
- County: Qaen
- District: Central
- Rural District: Mahyar

Population (2016)
  - Total: 160
- Time zone: UTC+3:30 (IRST)

Jabbar (Persian: جبار) (Note: Also romanized as Jabbār) is a village in Mahyar Rural District of the Central District in Qaen County, South Khorasan province, Iran.

== Demographics ==
=== Population ===
At the time of the 2006 National Census, the village's population was 169 in 41 households. The following census in 2011 counted 161 people in 44 households. The 2016 census measured the population of the village as 160 people in 54 households.
