= Qayen =

Qayen can refer to:

- Qayen, Iran
- Ghayen County, Iran
- Saffron, produced in Qayen, Iran
- Cain, as depicted in Rastafarian translations of the Bible
