= Binabaj =

Village in South Khorasan province, Iran

Binabaj Persian: بيناباج
- Village
- Location within Iran
- Coordinates: 34°03′12″N 58°41′26″E
- Country: Iran
- Province: South Khorasan
- County: Qaen
- District: Nimbeluk
- Rural District: Nimbeluk

Population (2016)
  - Total: 335
- Time zone: UTC+3:30 (IRST)

Binabaj (Persian: بيناباج) (Note: Also romanized as Beynābāj and Bīnābāj; also known as Beynāvāj) is a village in Nimbeluk Rural District of Nimbeluk District in Qaen County, South Khorasan province, Iran.

== Demographics ==
=== Population ===
At the time of the 2006 National Census, the village's population was 569 in 171 households. The following census in 2011 counted 370 people in 156 households. The 2016 census measured the population of the village as 335 people in 145 households.
