= Karghond =

Village in South Khorasan province, Iran

Karghond Persian: كرغند
- Village
- Location within Iran
- Coordinates: 33°48′38″N 58°42′39″E
- Country: Iran
- Province: South Khorasan
- County: Qaen
- District: Nimbeluk
- Rural District: Karghond

Population (2016)
  - Total: 2,852
- Time zone: UTC+3:30 (IRST)

Karghond (Persian: كرغند) (Note: Also known as Karqand, Korqond, and Kurgūnd) is a village in, and the capital of, Karghond Rural District in Nimbeluk District of Qaen County, South Khorasan province, Iran.

== Demographics ==
=== Population ===
At the time of the 2006 National Census, the village's population was 2,428 in 675 households. The following census in 2011 counted 3,253 people in 941 households. The 2016 census measured the population of the village as 2,852 people in 902 households, the most populous in its rural district.
