= Esfeshad =

Village in South Khorasan province, Iran

Esfeshad Persian: اسفشاد
- Village
- Location within Iran
- Coordinates: 33°45′31″N 59°16′39″E
- Country: Iran
- Province: South Khorasan
- County: Qaen
- District: Central
- Rural District: Qaen

Population (2016)
  - Total: 2,900
- Time zone: UTC+3:30 (IRST)

Esfeshad (Persian: اسفشاد) (Note: Also romanized as Esfashād and Esfeshād; also known as Asb Shahr and Asp Shahr) is a village in Qaen Rural District of the Central District in Qaen County, South Khorasan province, Iran.

== Demographics ==
=== Population ===
At the time of the 2006 National Census, the village's population was 2,400 in 582 households. The following census in 2011 counted 2,659 people in 761 households. The 2016 census measured the population of the village as 2,900 people in 848 households, the most populous in its rural district.
