= Beskabad =

Village in South Khorasan province, Iran

Beskabad Persian: بسكاباد
- Village
- Location within Iran
- Coordinates: 34°01′50″N 58°43′21″E
- Country: Iran
- Province: South Khorasan
- County: Qaen
- District: Nimbeluk
- Rural District: Nimbeluk

Population (2016)
  - Total: 225
- Time zone: UTC+3:30 (IRST)

Beskabad (Persian: بسكاباد) (Note: Also romanized as Besk Ābād, Besḵābād, Bosk Ābād, Boskabad, and Bosḵābād) is a village in Nimbeluk Rural District of Nimbeluk District in Qaen County, South Khorasan province, Iran.

== Demographics ==
=== Population ===
At the time of the 2006 National Census, the village's population was 393 in 118 households. The following census in 2011 counted 300 people in 132 households. The 2016 census measured the population of the village as 225 people in 103 households.
