= Ebrahimabad, Qaen =

Village in South Khorasan province, Iran

Ebrahimabad Persian: ابراهيم اباد
- Village
- Location within Iran
- Coordinates: 33°55′42″N 59°35′20″E
- Country: Iran
- Province: South Khorasan
- County: Qaen
- District: Central
- Rural District: Qaen

Population (2016)
  - Total: 619
- Time zone: UTC+3:30 (IRST)

Ebrahimabad (Persian: ابراهيم اباد) (Note: Also romanized as Ebrāhīmābād; also known as Mehdīābād (مهدي اباد), Qal‘eh Āqā Ḩājī, Qal‘eh-i-Āgha Hāji, and Qal‘eh-ye Āqā Ḩājjī) is a village in Qaen Rural District of the Central District in Qaen County, South Khorasan province, Iran.

== Demographics ==
=== Population ===
At the time of the 2006 National Census, the village's population was 539 in 118 households. The following census in 2011 counted 615 people in 165 households. The 2016 census measured the population of the village as 619 people in 168 households.
