= Shahik =

Village in South Khorasan province, Iran

Shahik Persian: شاهيك
- Village
- Location within Iran
- Coordinates: 33°42′02″N 59°11′23″E
- Country: Iran
- Province: South Khorasan
- County: Qaen
- District: Central
- Rural District: Qaen

Population (2016)
  - Total: 600
- Time zone: UTC+3:30 (IRST)

Shahik (Persian: شاهيك) (Note: Also romanized as Shāhīk; also known as Eslamiyeh) is a village in Qaen Rural District of the Central District in Qaen County, South Khorasan province, Iran.

== Demographics ==
=== Population ===
At the time of the 2006 National Census, the village's population was 230 in 58 households. The following census in 2011 counted 298 people in 78 households. The 2016 census measured the population of the village as 600 people in 118 households.
