= Andarik =

Village in South Khorasan province, Iran

Andarik Persian: اندريك
- Village
- Location within Iran
- Coordinates: 33°45′18″N 58°59′22″E
- Country: Iran
- Province: South Khorasan
- County: Qaen
- District: Central
- Rural District: Qaen

Population (2016)
  - Total: 553
- Time zone: UTC+3:30 (IRST)

Andarik (Persian: اندريك) (Note: Also romanized as Andarīk, Andark, and Anderīk) is a village in Qaen Rural District of the Central District in Qaen County, South Khorasan province, Iran.

== Demographics ==
=== Population ===
At the time of the 2006 National Census, the village's population was 510 in 147 households. The following census in 2011 counted 576 people in 185 households. The 2016 census measured the population of the village as 553 people in 169 households.
