= Sar Saran =

Village in South Khorasan province, Iran

Sar Saran Persian: سرساران
- Village
- Location within Iran
- Coordinates: 33°48′25″N 58°54′47″E
- Country: Iran
- Province: South Khorasan
- County: Qaen
- District: Central
- Rural District: Pishkuh

Population (2016)
  - Total: 67
- Time zone: UTC+3:30 (IRST)

Sar Saran (Persian: سرساران) (Note: Also romanized as Sar Sārān; also known as Sar Sārūn, Sar-e Sālārān, and Sar-i-Sahrah) is a village in Pishkuh Rural District of the Central District in Qaen County, South Khorasan province, Iran.

== Demographics ==
=== Population ===
At the time of the 2006 National Census, the village's population was 96 in 32 households. The following census in 2011 counted 89 people in 29 households. The 2016 census measured the population of the village as 67 people in 27 households.
