= Bidmeshk, Qaen =

Bidmeshk بيدمشك
- Village
- Location within Iran
- Coordinates: 33°35′58″N 59°10′41″E
- Country: Iran
- Province: South Khorasan
- County: Qaen
- Bakhsh: Central
- Rural District: Qaen

Population (2006)
  - Total: 222
- Time zone: UTC+3:30 (IRST)
  - Summer (DST): UTC+4:30 (IRDT)

Bidmeshk (Persian: بيدمشك, also Romanized as Bīdmeshk, Bīdmoshk, and Bīdmushk) is a village in Qaen Rural District, in the Central District of Qaen County, South Khorasan Province, Iran. At the 2006 census, its population was 222, in 59 families.
