= Bidmeshk =

Bidmeshk or Bidmishk or Bidmoshk or Bidmushk (Persian: بيدمشك) may refer to:

- Bidmeshk, Qaen
- Bidmeshk, Sarbisheh
