= Gajin =

Gajin (Persian: گجين) may refer to:

- Gajin, East Azerbaijan
- Gajin, South Khorasan
- Gajin, West Azerbaijan
- Jajang, Iran, also spelled as "Gājīn"
