= Esfian, South Khorasan =

Esfian اسفيان
- Village
- Location within Iran
- Coordinates: 33°58′43″N 58°42′15″E
- Country: Iran
- Province: South Khorasan
- County: Qaen
- Bakhsh: Nimbeluk
- Rural District: Nimbeluk

Population (2006)
  - Total: 33
- Time zone: UTC+3:30 (IRST)
  - Summer (DST): UTC+4:30 (IRDT)

Esfian (Persian: اسفيان, also Romanized as Esfīān; also known as Iapiu) is a village in Nimbeluk Rural District, Nimbeluk District, Qaen County, South Khorasan Province, Iran. At the 2006 census, its population was 33, in 8 families.
