= Deh-e Mir, Qaen =

Deh-e Mir ده مير
- Village
- Location within Iran
- Coordinates: 34°00′17″N 59°14′19″E
- Country: Iran
- Province: South Khorasan
- County: Qaen
- Bakhsh: Central
- Rural District: Mahyar

Population (2006)
  - Total: 91
- Time zone: UTC+3:30 (IRST)
  - Summer (DST): UTC+4:30 (IRDT)

Deh-e Mir (Persian: ده مير, also Romanized as Deh-e Mīr) is a village in Mahyar Rural District, in the Central District of Qaen County, South Khorasan Province, Iran. At the 2006 census, its population was 91, in 18 families.
