= Mohammadabad-e Alam =

Village in South Khorasan province, Iran

Mohammadabad-e Alam Persian: محمداباد علم
- Village
- Location within Iran
- Coordinates: 33°53′57″N 59°12′36″E
- Country: Iran
- Province: South Khorasan
- County: Qaen
- District: Central
- Rural District: Mahyar

Population (2016)
  - Total: 1,575
- Time zone: UTC+3:30 (IRST)

Mohammadabad-e Alam (Persian: محمداباد علم) (Note: Also romanized as Moḩammadābād-e ʿAlam) is a village in, and the capital of, Mahyar Rural District in the Central District of Qaen County, South Khorasan province, Iran.

== Demographics ==
=== Population ===
At the time of the 2006 National Census, the village's population was 1,395 in 323 households. The following census in 2011 counted 1,589 people in 415 households. The 2016 census measured the population of the village as 1,575 people in 449 households, the most populous in its rural district.
