= Varaz =

Varaz or Waraz may refer to:

- Baraz
- Varazq
