= Bakhshabad, South Khorasan =

Village in South Khorasan province, Iran

Bakhshabad Persian: بخش اباد
- Village
- Location within Iran
- Coordinates: 34°02′05″N 59°17′08″E
- Country: Iran
- Province: South Khorasan
- County: Qaen
- District: Central
- Rural District: Mahyar

Population (2016)
  - Total: 74
- Time zone: UTC+3:30 (IRST)

Bakhshabad (Persian: بخش اباد) (Note: Also romanized as Bakhshābād) is a village in Mahyar Rural District of the Central District in Qaen County, South Khorasan province, Iran.

== Demographics ==
=== Population ===
At the time of the 2006 National Census, the village's population was 86 in 14 households. The following census in 2011 counted 75 people in 15 households. The 2016 census measured the population of the village as 74 people in 23 households.
