= Esfian =

Esfian or Esfiyan or Esfeyan (Persian: اسفيان) may refer to:

- Esfian, Fars
- Esfian, South Khorasan
