= Zirenj =

Zirenj زيرنج
- Village
- Location within Iran
- Coordinates: 33°54′40″N 59°15′50″E
- Country: Iran
- Province: South Khorasan
- County: Qaen
- Bakhsh: Central
- Rural District: Mahyar

Population (2006)
  - Total: 58
- Time zone: UTC+3:30 (IRST)
  - Summer (DST): UTC+4:30 (IRDT)

Zirenj (Persian: زيرنج, also Romanized as Zīrenj and Zirinj; also known as Zerīnj and Zirach) is a village in Mahyar Rural District, in the Central District of Qaen County, South Khorasan Province, Iran. At the 2006 census, its population was 58, in 15 families.
