= Hajjiabad-e Nughab =

Village in South Khorasan province, Iran

Hajjiabad-e Nughab Persian: حاجي ابادنوغاب
- Village
- Location within Iran
- Coordinates: 33°51′59″N 59°03′34″E
- Country: Iran
- Province: South Khorasan
- County: Qaen
- District: Central
- Rural District: Mahyar

Population (2016)
  - Total: 743
- Time zone: UTC+3:30 (IRST)

Hajjiabad-e Nughab (Persian: حاجي ابادنوغاب) (Note: Also romanized as Ḩājjīābād-e Nūghāb; also known as Nūghāb-e Ḩājjīābād (نوغاب حاجي اباد)) is a village in Mahyar Rural District of the Central District in Qaen County, South Khorasan province, Iran.

== Demographics ==
=== Population ===
At the time of the 2006 National Census, the village's population was 1,023 in 238 households. The following census in 2011 counted 766 people in 220 households. The 2016 census measured the population of the village as 743 people in 232 households.
