= Hatamabad, South Khorasan =

Hatamabad حاتم اباد
- Village
- Location within Iran
- Coordinates: 33°59′21″N 59°16′55″E
- Country: Iran
- Province: South Khorasan
- County: Qaen
- Bakhsh: Central
- Rural District: Mahyar

Population (2006)
  - Total: 102
- Time zone: UTC+3:30 (IRST)
  - Summer (DST): UTC+4:30 (IRDT)

Hatamabad (Persian: حاتم اباد, also Romanized as Ḩātamābād) is a village in Mahyar Rural District, in the Central District of Qaen County, South Khorasan Province, Iran. At the 2006 census, its population was 102, in 24 families.
