= Khanik =

Khanik (Persian: خانيك) may refer to:

- Al-Khalidiyah, al-Hasakah Governorate, a village in Syria
- Mağaracık, Nusaybin, a village in Turkey

== Iran ==
- Khanik, Fars
- Khanik, Razavi Khorasan
- Khanik, Boshruyeh, South Khorasan
- Khanik, Eresk, South Khorasan
- Khanik, Ferdows, South Khorasan
- Khanik, Beradust, Urmia County, West Azerbaijan Province
- Khanik, Sumay-ye Shomali, Urmia County, West Azerbaijan Province
- Khanik, Zanjan

== See also ==
- Khunik (disambiguation)
- Nowkhanik
