= Kali, South Khorasan =

Village in South Khorasan province, Iran

Kali Persian: كلي
- Village
- Location within Iran
- Coordinates: 34°00′44″N 59°22′10″E
- Country: Iran
- Province: South Khorasan
- County: Qaen
- District: Central
- Rural District: Mahyar

Population (2016)
  - Total: 721
- Time zone: UTC+3:30 (IRST)

Kali (Persian: كلي) (Note: Also romanized as Kalī) is a village in Mahyar Rural District of the Central District in Qaen County, South Khorasan province, Iran.

== Demographics ==
=== Population ===
At the time of the 2006 National Census, the village's population was 694 in 167 households. The following census in 2011 counted 721 people in 184 households. The 2016 census measured the population of the village as 721 people in 202 households.
