= Mahyar, South Khorasan =

Mahyar مهيار
- Village
- Location within Iran
- Coordinates: 33°56′08″N 59°15′57″E
- Country: Iran
- Province: South Khorasan
- County: Qaen
- Bakhsh: Central
- Rural District: Mahyar

Population (2006)
  - Total: 49
- Time zone: UTC+3:30 (IRST)
  - Summer (DST): UTC+4:30 (IRDT)

Mahyar (Persian: مهيار, also Romanized as Mahyār) is a village in Mahyar Rural District, in the Central District of Qaen County, South Khorasan Province, Iran. At the 2006 census, its population was 49, in 12 families.
