= Barenjegan =

Village in South Khorasan province, Iran

Barenjegan Persian: بارنجگان
- Village
- Location within Iran
- Coordinates: 33°36′19″N 60°25′20″E
- Country: Iran
- Province: South Khorasan
- County: Zirkuh
- District: Central
- Rural District: Petergan

Population (2016)
  - Total: 1,528
- Time zone: UTC+3:30 (IRST)

Barenjegan (Persian: بارنجگان) (Note: Also romanized as Bārenjegān; also known as Bārenjekān and Bārenjkān) is a village in Petergan Rural District of the Central District in Zirkuh County, South Khorasan province, Iran.

== Demographics ==
=== Population ===
At the time of the 2006 National Census, the village's population was 1,352 in 284 households, when it was in the former Zirkuh District of Qaen County. The following census in 2011 counted 1,609 people in 376 households. The 2016 census measured the population of the village as 1,528 people in 400 households, by which time the district had been separated from the county in the establishment of Zirkuh County. The rural district was transferred to the new Central District.
