= Zul =

Zul, ZUL or variations thereof may refer to:

== People ==
- Zul Kifl Salami (fl. 21st century), politician and economist from Benin
- Zul Yusri Che Harun (born 1986), Malaysian footballer
- Zul Sutan (1957–2018), Singaporean singer and guitarist
- Damdingiin Zul (born 1973), Mongolian boxer

== Other uses ==
- Zul, South Khorasan, Iran, a village
- Zürcher Unterländer or ZUL, a Swiss German-language daily newspaper
- Z.u.L., a free, open source geometry app
- Zul, a dialect of the Polci language, spoken in Nigeria
- zul, ISO 639-2 and -3 code for the Zulu language, spoken in Southern Africa
- Zul, the Kalmyk New Year - see Burkhan Bakshin Altan Sume
