= Makarom =

Makarom may refer to:

- Jirawat Makarom (b. 1986), Thai footballer
- Makarom, Iran, a village in South Khorasan Province, Iran
