= Varzaq =

Varzaq (Persian: ورزق) may refer to:

- Varzaq, South Khorasan
- Varzaq Rural District, in Isfahan Province
- Varzaq-e Jonubi Rural District, in Isfahan Province
