= Chah-e Amiq =

Village in South Khorasan province, Iran

Chah-e Amiq Persian: چاه عميق
- Village
- Location within Iran
- Coordinates: 33°20′55″N 60°35′30″E
- Country: Iran
- Province: South Khorasan
- County: Zirkuh
- District: Central
- Rural District: Petergan

Population (2016)
  - Total: 318
- Time zone: UTC+3:30 (IRST)

Chah-e Amiq (Persian: چاه عميق) (Note: Also romanized as Chāh-e Amīq; also known as Chah-e Kamkhan (چاه كامخان)) is a village in Petergan Rural District of the Central District in Zirkuh County, South Khorasan province, Iran.

== Demographics ==
=== Population ===
At the time of the 2006 National Census, the village's population was 551 in 104 households, when it was in the former Zirkuh District of Qaen County. The following census in 2011 counted 602 people in 151 households. The 2016 census measured the population of the village as 318 people in 72 households, by which time the district had been separated from the county in the establishment of Zirkuh County. The rural district was transferred to the new Central District.
