= Nughab-e Paskuh =

Village in South Khorasan province, Iran

Nughab-e Paskuh Persian: نوغاب پسكوه
- Village
- Location within Iran
- Coordinates: 33°47′35″N 58°45′45″E
- Country: Iran
- Province: South Khorasan
- County: Qaen
- District: Central
- Rural District: Pishkuh

Population (2016)
  - Total: 1,192
- Time zone: UTC+3:30 (IRST)

Nughab-e Paskuh (Persian: نوغاب پسكوه) (Note: Also romanized as Nowghāb-e Pas Kūh, Nowghab-e Pas Kuh, and Nūghāb-e Paskūh; also known as Nowghāb, Nowqāb, and Nūghāb) is a village in Pishkuh Rural District of the Central District in Qaen County, South Khorasan province, Iran.

== Demographics ==
=== Population ===
At the time of the 2006 National Census, the village's population was 1,263 in 351 households. The following census in 2011 counted 1,423 people in 435 households. The 2016 census measured the population of the village as 1,192 people in 390 households.
