= Chah-e Allah Dad =

Village in South Khorasan province, Iran

Chah-e Allah Dad Persian: چاه اله داد
- Village
- Location within Iran
- Coordinates: 33°15′48″N 60°29′13″E
- Country: Iran
- Province: South Khorasan
- County: Zirkuh
- District: Central
- Rural District: Petergan

Population (2016)
  - Total: 132
- Time zone: UTC+3:30 (IRST)

Chah-e Allah Dad (Persian: چاه اله داد) (Note: Also romanized as Chāh-e Allāh Dād) is a village in Petergan Rural District of the Central District in Zirkuh County, South Khorasan province, Iran.

== Demographics ==
=== Population ===
At the time of the 2006 National Census, the village's population was 91 in 20 households, when it was in the former Zirkuh District of Qaen County. The following census in 2011 counted 156 people in 36 households. The 2016 census measured the population of the village as 132 people in 37 households, by which time the district had been separated from the county in the establishment of Zirkuh County. The rural district was transferred to the new Central District.
