= Gerimenj =

Village in South Khorasan province, Iran

Gerimenj Persian: گري منج
- Village
- Location within Iran
- Coordinates: 33°53′49″N 58°54′03″E
- Country: Iran
- Province: South Khorasan
- County: Qaen
- District: Nimbeluk
- Rural District: Nimbeluk

Population (2016)
  - Total: 878
- Time zone: UTC+3:30 (IRST)

Gerimenj (Persian: گري منج) (Note: Also romanized as Gerīmenj; also known as Gerīmench, Germānj, Girimānj, Gīrīmenj, and Kerīmonj) is a village in Nimbeluk Rural District of Nimbeluk District in Qaen County, South Khorasan province, Iran.

== Demographics ==
=== Population ===
At the time of the 2006 National Census, the village's population was 807 in 220 households. The following census in 2011 counted 905 people in 256 households. The 2016 census measured the population of the village as 878 people in 265 households.
