= Mahmui =

Mahmui (Persian: مهموئي) may refer to:

- Mahmui, Birjand, South Khorasan
- Mahmui, Qaen, South Khorasan
