= Masumabad, Zirkuh =

Village in South Khorasan province, Iran

Masumabad Persian: معصوم اباد
- Village
- Location within Iran
- Coordinates: 33°30′24″N 60°27′52″E
- Country: Iran
- Province: South Khorasan
- County: Zirkuh
- District: Central
- Rural District: Petergan

Population (2016)
  - Total: 203
- Time zone: UTC+3:30 (IRST)

Masumabad (Persian: معصوم اباد) (Note: Also romanized as Ma‘şūmābād; also known as Kaleh Māsūmābād, Ma‘ẕūmābād, and Qal‘eh Māsūmābād) is a village in Petergan Rural District of the Central District in Zirkuh County, South Khorasan province, Iran.

== Demographics ==
=== Population ===
At the time of the 2006 National Census, the village's population was 201 in 50 households, when it was in the former Zirkuh District of Qaen County. The following census in 2011 counted 162 people in 39 households. The 2016 census measured the population of the village as 203 people in 60 households, by which time the district had been separated from the county in the establishment of Zirkuh County. The rural district was transferred to the new Central District.
