= Chehel Dokhtar Castle =

Castle in South Khorasan Province, Iran

Chehel Dokhtar castle
- قلعه چهل دختر

General information
- Type: Castle
- Location: Qaen County, Iran

Chehel Dokhtar castle (Persian: قلعه چهل دختر) is a historical castle located in Qaen County in South Khorasan Province, The longevity of this fortress dates back to the Nizari Ismaili state.
