= Maleki, South Khorasan =

Village in South Khorasan province, Iran

Maleki Persian: ملكي
- Village
- Location within Iran
- Coordinates: 33°16′27″N 60°30′51″E
- Country: Iran
- Province: South Khorasan
- County: Zirkuh
- District: Central
- Rural District: Petergan

Population (2016)
  - Total: 382
- Time zone: UTC+3:30 (IRST)

Maleki (Persian: ملكي) (Note: Also romanized as Malekī; also known as Maliki) is a village in Petergan Rural District of the Central District in Zirkuh County, South Khorasan province, Iran.

== Demographics ==
=== Population ===
At the time of the 2006 National Census, the village's population was 466 in 120 households, when it was in the former Zirkuh District of Qaen County. The following census in 2011 counted 412 people in 111 households. The 2016 census measured the population of the village as 382 people in 117 households, by which time the district had been separated from the county in the establishment of Zirkuh County. The rural district was transferred to the new Central District.
