= Zul, South Khorasan =

Village in South Khorasan province, Iran

Zul Persian: زول
- Village
- Location within Iran
- Coordinates: 33°36′43″N 59°07′02″E
- Country: Iran
- Province: South Khorasan
- County: Qaen
- District: Central
- Rural District: Qaen

Population (2016)
  - Total: 752
- Time zone: UTC+3:30 (IRST)

Zul (Persian: زول) (Note: Also romanized as Zūl) is a village in Qaen Rural District of the Central District in Qaen County, South Khorasan province, Iran.

== Demographics ==
=== Population ===
At the time of the 2006 National Census, the village's population was 839 in 232 households. The following census in 2011 counted 815 people in 261 households. The 2016 census measured the population of the village as 752 people in 249 households.
