= Khunik-e Pay Godar =

Khunik-e Pay Godar خونيك پاي گدار
- Village
- Location within Iran
- Coordinates: 33°33′50″N 59°10′26″E
- Country: Iran
- Province: South Khorasan
- County: Qaen
- Bakhsh: Central
- Rural District: Qaen

Population (2006)
  - Total: 97
- Time zone: UTC+3:30 (IRST)
  - Summer (DST): UTC+4:30 (IRDT)

Khunik-e Pay Godar (Persian: خونيك پاي گدار, also romanized as Khūnīk-e Pāy Godār and Khūnīk-e Pā Godār; also known as Khūnīk, Khānaq, Khūnīk Bālā and Khūnīk ‘Olyā) is a village in Qaen Rural District, in the Central District of Qaen County, South Khorasan Province, Iran. At the 2006 census, its population was 97, in 31 families.
