= Hemmatabad, Zirkuh =

Village in South Khorasan province, Iran

Hemmatabad Persian: همت اباد
- Village
- Location within Iran
- Coordinates: 33°19′06″N 60°22′50″E
- Country: Iran
- Province: South Khorasan
- County: Zirkuh
- District: Central
- Rural District: Petergan

Population (2016)
  - Total: 238
- Time zone: UTC+3:30 (IRST)

Hemmatabad (Persian: همت اباد) (Note: Also romanized as Hemmatābād; also known as Khvājeh) is a village in Petergan Rural District of the Central District in Zirkuh County, South Khorasan province, Iran.

== Demographics ==
=== Population ===
At the time of the 2006 National Census, the village's population was 220 in 58 households, when it was in the former Zirkuh District of Qaen County. The following census in 2011 counted 236 people in 64 households. The 2016 census measured the population of the village as 238 people in 64 households, by which time the district had been separated from the county in the establishment of Zirkuh County. The rural district was transferred to the new Central District.
