= Abiz-e Jadid =

City in South Khorasan province, Iran

Abiz-e Jadid Persian: ابيز جديد
- City
- Location within Iran
- Coordinates: 33°41′35″N 59°57′45″E
- Country: Iran
- Province: South Khorasan
- County: Zirkuh
- District: Shaskuh
- Established as a city: 2018

Population (2016)
  - Total: 2,716
- Time zone: UTC+3:30 (IRST)

Abiz-e Jadid (Persian: ابيز جديد) (Note: Also romanized as Ābīz-e Jadīd; also known as Ābīz) is a city in, and the capital of, Shaskuh District of Zirkuh County, South Khorasan province, Iran. It also serves as the administrative center for Shaskuh Rural District.

== Demographics ==
=== Population ===
At the time of the 2006 National Census, Abiz-e Jadid's population was 2,102 in 874 households, when it was a village in Shaskuh Rural District of the former Zirkuh District in Qaen County. The following census in 2011 counted 3,077 people in 776 households. The 2016 census measured the population of the village as 2,716 people in 787 households, by which time the district had been separated from the county in the establishment of Zirkuh County. The rural district was transferred to the new Shaskuh District. Abiz-e Jadid was the most populous village in its rural district.

Abiz-e Jadid was converted to a city in 2018.
