= Bohnabad Rural District =

Rural district in South Khorasan province, Iran

Bohnabad Rural District Persian: دهستان بهناباد
- Rural District
- Location within Iran
- Coordinates: 33°51′N 59°57′E
- Country: Iran
- Province: South Khorasan
- County: Zirkuh
- District: Shaskuh
- Established: 2011
- Capital: Bahmanabad-e Jadid

Population (2016)
  - Total: 5,468
- Time zone: UTC+3:30 (IRST)

Bohnabad Rural District (Persian: دهستان بهناباد) is in Shaskuh District of Zirkuh County, South Khorasan province, Iran. Its capital is the village of Bahmanabad-e Jadid.

== History ==
In 2011, Zirkuh and Zohan Districts were separated from Qaen County in the establishment of Zirkuh County, and Bohnabad Rural District was created in the new Shaskuh District.

== Demographics ==
=== Population ===
At the time of the 2016 National Census, the rural district's population was 5,468 in 1,518 households. The most populous of its eight villages was Fandokht-e Jadid, with 1,665 people.

=== Other villages in the rural district ===
- Astand-e Jadid
- Karizan-e Sofla
- Niyar
- Shahrak-e Bidokht
- Shahrak-e Chah Payab Chah Shatt
