= Shumeh =

Shumeh شومه
- Village
- Location within Iran
- Coordinates: 32°43′55″N 60°01′32″E
- Country: Iran
- Province: South Khorasan
- County: Darmian
- Bakhsh: Central
- Rural District: Darmian

Population (2006)
  - Total: 39
- Time zone: UTC+3:30 (IRST)
  - Summer (DST): UTC+4:30 (IRDT)

Shumeh (Persian: شومه, also Romanized as Shūmeh, Shameh, Shāmeh, and Shommeh; also known as Showmen) is a village in Darmian Rural District, in the Central District of Darmian County, South Khorasan Province, Iran. At the 2006 census, its population was 39, in 9 families.
