= Kalateh Hajji Ata =

Kalateh Hajji Ata كلاته حاجي عطا
- Village
- Location within Iran
- Coordinates: 32°44′00″N 59°58′00″E
- Country: Iran
- Province: South Khorasan
- County: Darmian
- Bakhsh: Central
- Rural District: Darmian

Population (2006)
  - Total: 97
- Time zone: UTC+3:30 (IRST)
  - Summer (DST): UTC+4:30 (IRDT)

Kalateh Hajji Ata (Persian: كلاته حاجي عطا, also Romanized as Kalāteh Hājjī ‘Aţā; also known as Ḩājjī ‘Atā, Haji Ata, Hāji Atta, Ḩâjji Aţţā’, and Hājjī ‘Aţţār) is a village in Darmian Rural District, in the Central District of Darmian County, South Khorasan Province, Iran. At the 2006 census, its population was 97, in 27 families.
