= Yazdan, South Khorasan =

Village in South Khorasan province, Iran

Yazdan Persian: يزدان
- Village
- Location within Iran
- Coordinates: 33°30′26″N 60°53′58″E
- Country: Iran
- Province: South Khorasan
- County: Zirkuh
- District: Central
- Rural District: Petergan

Population (2016)
  - Total: 94
- Time zone: UTC+3:30 (IRST)

Yazdan (Persian: يزدان) (Note: Also romanized as Yazdān) is a village in Petergan Rural District of the Central District in Zirkuh County, South Khorasan province, Iran.

== Demographics ==
=== Population ===
The village did not appear in the 2006 and 2011 National Censuses, when it was in the former Zirkuh District of Qaen County. The 2016 census measured the population of the village as 94 people in five households, by which time the district had been separated from the county in the establishment of Zirkuh County. The rural district was transferred to the new Central District.
