= Istind =

Istind, Istinden, or Istindan may refer to:

== Villages ==
- Istind, Iran, a village in South Khorasan Province, Iran

== Mountains ==
- Istind Peak, a peak on the east side of Ahlmann Ridge in Queen Maud Land, Antarctica
- Istinden (Balsfjord), a mountain in Balsfjord Municipality in Troms county, Norway
- Istind (Bardu), a mountain in Bardu Municipality in Troms county, Norway
- Istind (Greenland), a mountain in the Watkins Range in Greenland
- Istinden (Lyngen), a mountain in Lyngen Municipality in Troms county, Norway
- Istindan (Målselv), a mountain in Målselv Municipality in Troms county, Norway
- Istinden (Nordland), a mountain in Meløy Municipality in Nordland county, Norway
- Istind (Senja), a mountain in Senja Municipality in Troms county, Norway
- Istinden (Tromsø), a mountain in Tromsø Municipality in Troms county, Norway
