= Mahmui, Qaen =

Village in South Khorasan province, Iran

Mahmui Persian: مهموئي
- Village
- Location within Iran
- Coordinates: 33°44′07″N 59°14′19″E
- Country: Iran
- Province: South Khorasan
- County: Qaen
- District: Central
- Rural District: Qaen

Population (2016)
  - Total: 452
- Time zone: UTC+3:30 (IRST)

Mahmui (Persian: مهموئي) (Note: Also romanized as Mahmū’ī) is a village in, and the capital of, Qaen Rural District in the Central District of Qaen County, South Khorasan province, Iran.

== Demographics ==
=== Population ===
At the time of the 2006 National Census, the village's population was 210 in 51 households. The following census in 2011 counted 253 people in 71 households. The 2016 census measured the population of the village as 452 people in 99 households.
