= Varazq =

Varazq ورزق
- Village
- Location within Iran
- Coordinates: 33°38′53″N 59°19′21″E
- Country: Iran
- Province: South Khorasan
- County: Qaen
- Bakhsh: Central
- Rural District: Qaen

Population (2006)
  - Total: 95
- Time zone: UTC+3:30 (IRST)
  - Summer (DST): UTC+4:30 (IRDT)

Varazq (Persian: ورزق, also Romanized as Varzaq and Vorazq; also known as Vārāz and Wārāz) is a village in Qaen Rural District, in the Central District of Qaen County, South Khorasan Province, Iran. At the 2006 census, its population was 95, in 39 families.
