= Chah-e Zard, Zirkuh =

Village in South Khorasan province, Iran

Chah-e Zard Persian: چاه زرد
- Village
- Location within Iran
- Coordinates: 33°27′20″N 60°28′31″E
- Country: Iran
- Province: South Khorasan
- County: Zirkuh
- District: Central
- Rural District: Petergan

Population (2016)
  - Total: 326
- Time zone: UTC+3:30 (IRST)

Chah-e Zard (Persian: چاه زرد) (Note: Also romanized as Chāh-e Zard; also known as Hajjiabad-e Haqdad (حاجي ابادحقداد)) is a village in Petergan Rural District of the Central District in Zirkuh County, South Khorasan province, Iran.

== Demographics ==
=== Population ===
At the time of the 2006 National Census, the village's population was 294 in 77 households, when it was in the former Zirkuh District of Qaen County. The following census in 2011 counted 321 people in 87 households. The 2016 census measured the population of the village as 326 people in 99 households, by which time the district had been separated from the county in the establishment of Zirkuh County. The rural district was transferred to the new Central District.
