= Shah Rakht =

Village in South Khorasan province, Iran

Shahrakht Persian: شاهرخت
- Village
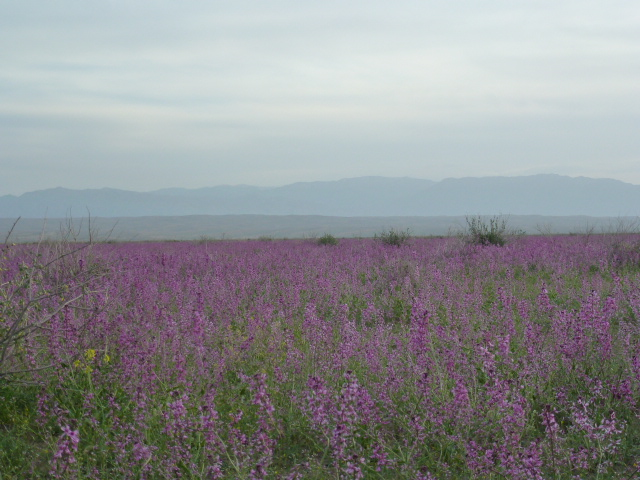
- Landscape near the village of Shah Rakht

- Location within Iran
- Coordinates: 33°38′06″N 60°16′22″E
- Country: Iran
- Province: South Khorasan
- County: Zirkuh
- District: Central
- Rural District: Petergan

Population (2016)
  - Total: 2,404
- Time zone: UTC+3:30 (IRST)

Shahrakht (Persian: شاهرخت) (Note: Also romanized as Shāhrakht) is a village in, and the capital of, Petergan Rural District in the Central District of Zirkuh County, South Khorasan province, Iran.

== Demographics ==
=== Population ===
At the time of the 2006 National Census, the village's population was 2,427 in 515 households, when it was in the former Zirkuh District of Qaen County. The following census in 2011 counted 2,538 people in 578 households. The 2016 census measured the population of the village as 2,404 people in 652 households, by which time the district had been separated from the county in the establishment of Zirkuh County. The rural district was transferred to the new Central District. Shah Rakht was the most populous village in its rural district.
