= Daderan =

Village in South Khorasan province, Iran

Daderan Persian: دادران
- Village
- Location within Iran
- Coordinates: 32°49′18″N 59°53′54″E
- Country: Iran
- Province: South Khorasan
- County: Darmian
- District: Central
- Rural District: Darmian

Population (2016)
  - Total: 479
- Time zone: UTC+3:30 (IRST)

Daderan (Persian: دادران) (Note: Also romanized as Dāderān) is a village in Darmian Rural District of the Central District in Darmian County, South Khorasan province, Iran.

== Demographics ==
=== Population ===
At the time of the 2006 National Census, the village's population was 325 in 66 households. The following census in 2011 counted 416 people in 101 households. The 2016 census measured the population of the village as 479 people in 129 households.
