= Sarshabad =

Village in South Khorasan province, Iran

Sarshabad Persian: سرش اباد
- Village
- Location within Iran
- Country: Iran
- Province: South Khorasan
- County: Darmian
- District: Central
- Rural District: Darmian

Population (2016)
  - Total: 34
- Time zone: UTC+3:30 (IRST)

Sarshabad (Persian: سرش اباد) (Note: Also romanized as Sarshābād; also known as Sashāvard) is a village in Darmian Rural District of the Central District in Darmian County, South Khorasan province, Iran.

== Demographics ==
=== Population ===
At the time of the 2006 National Census, the village's population was 74 in 19 households, when it was in Momenabad Rural District of the Central District in Sarbisheh County. The following census in 2011 counted 52 people in 15 households, by which time the village had been transferred to Darmian Rural District in the Central District of Darmian County. The 2016 census measured the population of the village as 34 people in eight households.
