= Mohammadabad-e Olya, South Khorasan =

Village in South Khorasan province, Iran

Mohammadabad-e Olya Persian: محمدابادعليا
- Village
- Location within Iran
- Coordinates: 32°50′11″N 59°52′37″E
- Country: Iran
- Province: South Khorasan
- County: Darmian
- District: Central
- Rural District: Darmian

Population (2016)
  - Total: 212
- Time zone: UTC+3:30 (IRST)

Mohammadabad-e Olya (Persian: محمدابادعليا) (Note: Also romanized as Moḩammadābād-e ‘Olyā; also known as Moḩammadābād-e Bālā) is a village in Darmian Rural District of the Central District in Darmian County, South Khorasan province, Iran.

== Demographics ==
=== Population ===
At the time of the 2006 National Census, the village's population was 177 in 59 households. The following census in 2011 counted 146 people in 42 households. The 2016 census measured the population of the village as 212 people in 63 households.
