= Eskandar, South Khorasan =

Village in South Khorasan province, Iran

Eskandar Persian: اسكندر
- Village
- Location within Iran
- Coordinates: 32°46′10″N 59°56′40″E
- Country: Iran
- Province: South Khorasan
- County: Darmian
- District: Central
- Rural District: Darmian

Population (2016)
  - Total: 176
- Time zone: UTC+3:30 (IRST)

Eskandar (Persian: اسكندر) (Note: Also romanized as Iskāndar) is a village in Darmian Rural District of the Central District in Darmian County, South Khorasan province, Iran.

== Demographics ==
=== Population ===
At the time of the 2006 National Census, the village's population was 163 in 44 households. The following census in 2011 counted 170 people in 48 households. The 2016 census measured the population of the village as 176 people in 44 households.
