= Khezri Dasht Beyaz =

City in South Khorasan province, Iran

Khezri Dasht Beyaz Persian: خضری دشت بیاض
- City
- Location within Iran
- Coordinates: 34°01′22″N 58°48′46″E
- Country: Iran
- Province: South Khorasan
- County: Qaen
- District: Nimbeluk

Population (2016)
  - Total: 5,680
- Time zone: UTC+3:30 (IRST)
- Website: khezridashtebayaz.ir

Khezri Dasht Bayaz (Persian: خضری دشت بیاض) (Note: Also known as Kezri and Kheẕrī (خضری); formerly known as Shahabad (شاه‌آباد), also romanized as Shāhābād) is a city in, and the capital of, Nimbeluk District in Qaen County, South Khorasan province, Iran.

== Demographics ==
=== Population ===
At the time of the 2006 National Census, the city's population was 4,930 in 1,385 households. The following census in 2011 counted 5,761 people in 1,606 households. The 2016 census measured the population of the city as 5,680 people in 1,669 households.
