= Nimbeluk =

City in South Khorasan province, Iran

Nimbeluk Persian: نیمبلوک
- City
- Location within Iran
- Coordinates: 33°54′39″N 58°55′52″E
- Country: Iran
- Province: South Khorasan
- County: Qaen
- District: Nimbeluk
- Established as a city: 2004

Population (2016)
  - Total: 4,762
- Time zone: UTC+3:30 (IRST)

Nimbeluk (Persian: نیمبلوک) (Note: Also romanized as Nīmbelūk, Nīmbolouḵ and Nimbolouk; formerly the village of Eslamabad) is a city in Nimbeluk District of Qaen County, South Khorasan province, Iran, serving as the administrative center for Nimbeluk Rural District. The village of Eslamabad was converted to a city and renamed Nimbeluk in 2004.

== Demographics ==
=== Population ===
At the time of the 2006 National Census, the city's population was 3,886 in 946 households. The following census in 2011 counted 4,393 people in 1,184 households. The 2016 census measured the population of the city as 4,762 people in 1,332 households.
