= Mud-e Olya =

Village in South Khorasan province, Iran

Mud-e Olya Persian: مود عليا
- Village
- Location within Iran
- Coordinates: 32°41′50″N 60°03′16″E
- Country: Iran
- Province: South Khorasan
- County: Darmian
- District: Central
- Rural District: Darmian

Population (2016)
  - Total: 144
- Time zone: UTC+3:30 (IRST)

Mud-e Olya (Persian: مود عليا) (Note: Also romanized as Moud-e Olya and Mūd-e ‘Olyā; also known as Mavād, Mūd, and Murād) is a village in Darmian Rural District of the Central District in Darmian County, South Khorasan province, Iran.

== Demographics ==
=== Population ===
At the time of the 2006 National Census, the village's population was 134 in 27 households. The following census in 2011 counted 101 people in 25 households. The 2016 census measured the population of the village as 144 people in 34 households.
