= Esfeden =

City in South Khorasan province, Iran

Esfeden Persian: اسفدن
- City
- Location within Iran
- Coordinates: 33°38′38″N 59°46′44″E
- Country: Iran
- Province: South Khorasan
- County: Qaen
- District: Central
- Established as a city: 2004

Population (2016)
  - Total: 3,598
- Time zone: UTC+3:30 (IRST)

Esfeden (Persian: اسفدن) (Note: Also known as Esfedān) is a city in the Central District of Qaen County, South Khorasan province, Iran. The village of Esfeden was converted to a city in 2004.

== Demographics ==
=== Population ===
At the time of the 2006 National Census, the city's population was 3,145 in 759 households. The following census in 2011 counted 3,530 people in 914 households. The 2016 census measured the population of the city as 3,598 people in 1,070 households.
