= Petergan Rural District =

Rural district in South Khorasan province, Iran

Petergan Rural District Persian: دهستان پترگان
- Rural District
- Location within Iran
- Coordinates: 33°32′N 60°33′E
- Country: Iran
- Province: South Khorasan
- County: Zirkuh
- District: Central
- Established: 1986
- Capital: Shah Rakht

Population (2016)
  - Total: 5,976
- Time zone: UTC+3:30 (IRST)

Petergan Rural District (Persian: دهستان پترگان) is in the Central District of Zirkuh County, South Khorasan province, Iran. Its capital is the village of Shah Rakht.

== Demographics ==
=== Population ===
At the time of the 2006 National Census, the rural district's population (as a part of the former Zirkuh District in Qaen County) was 5,865 in 1,287 households. There were 6,375 inhabitants in 1,536 households at the following census of 2011. The 2016 census measured the population of the rural district as 5,976 in 1,584 households, by which time the district had been separated from the county in the establishment of Zirkuh County. The rural district was transferred to the new Central District. The most populous of its 12 villages was Shah Rakht, with 2,404 people.

=== Other villages in the rural district ===
- Barenjegan
- Chah-e Allah Dad
- Chah-e Amiq
- Chah-e Zard
- Cheshmeh Bid
- Hemmatabad
- Maleki
- Masumabad
- Yazdan
