= Pishkuh Rural District (Qaen County) =

Rural district in South Khorasan province, Iran

Pishkuh Rural District Persian: دهستان پيشكوه
- Rural District
- Location within Iran
- Coordinates: 33°46′N 58°51′E
- Country: Iran
- Province: South Khorasan
- County: Qaen
- District: Central
- Established: 1986
- Capital: Bihud

Population (2016)
  - Total: 3,793
- Time zone: UTC+3:30 (IRST)

Pishkuh Rural District (Persian: دهستان پيشكوه) is in the Central District of Qaen County, South Khorasan province, Iran. Its capital is the village of Bihud.

== Demographics ==
=== Population ===
At the time of the 2006 National Census, the rural district's population was 3,295 in 1,012 households. There were 3,837 inhabitants in 1,206 households at the following census of 2011. The 2016 census measured the population of the rural district as 3,793 in 1,322 households. The most populous of its 18 villages was Bihud, with 1,577 people.

=== Other villages in the rural district ===
- Boz Bisheh
- Khunik-e Tajan
- Nughab-e Paskuh
- Sar Saran
- Shandan
- Tajan
