= Khunik-e Pain, Qaen =

Khunik-e Pain خونيك پائين
- Village
- Location within Iran
- Coordinates: 33°46′17″N 59°21′55″E
- Country: Iran
- Province: South Khorasan
- County: Qaen
- Bakhsh: Central
- Rural District: Qaen

Population (2006)
  - Total: 399
- Time zone: UTC+3:30 (IRST)
  - Summer (DST): UTC+4:30 (IRDT)

Khunik-e Pain (Persian: خونيك پائين, also Romanized as Khūnīk-e Pā’īn and Khūnīk Pā’īn; also known as Khānaq, Khānaq-e Pā’īn, and Khānaq-i-Pāīn) is a village in Qaen Rural District, in the Central District of Qaen County, South Khorasan Province, Iran. At the 2006 census, its population was 399, in 103 families.
