= Cheshmeh Bid, South Khorasan =

Village in South Khorasan province, Iran

Cheshmeh Bid Persian: چشمه بيد
- Village
- Location within Iran
- Coordinates: 33°17′47″N 60°26′42″E
- Country: Iran
- Province: South Khorasan
- County: Zirkuh
- District: Central
- Rural District: Petergan

Population (2016)
  - Total: 264
- Time zone: UTC+3:30 (IRST)

Cheshmeh Bid (Persian: چشمه بيد) (Note: Also romanized as Cheshmeh Bīd; also known as Cheshmeh Bīdeh) is a village in Petergan Rural District of the Central District in Zirkuh County, South Khorasan province, Iran.

== Demographics ==
=== Population ===
At the time of the 2006 National Census, the village's population was 263 in 59 households, when it was in the former Zirkuh District of Qaen County. The following census in 2011 counted 253 people in 70 households. The 2016 census measured the population of the village as 264 people in 74 households, by which time the district had been separated from the county in the establishment of Zirkuh County. The rural district was transferred to the new Central District.
