= Darmian, South Khorasan =

Village in South Khorasan province, Iran

Darmian Persian: درميان
- Village
- Location within Iran
- Coordinates: 32°50′11″N 59°54′10″E
- Country: Iran
- Province: South Khorasan
- County: Darmian
- District: Central
- Rural District: Darmian

Population (2016)
  - Total: 1,657
- Time zone: UTC+3:30 (IRST)

Darmian (Persian: درميان,) (Note: Also romanized as Darmīān and Darmiyān; also known as Dād Dān) is a village in, and the capital of, Darmian Rural District in the Central District of Darmian County, South Khorasan province, Iran.

== Demographics ==
=== Population ===
At the time of the 2006 National Census, the village's population was 1,269 in 340 households. The following census in 2011 counted 1,645 people in 442 households. The 2016 census measured the population of the village as 1,657 people in 478 households, the most populous in its rural district.
