= Karghond Rural District =

Rural district in South Khorasan province, Iran

Karghond Rural District Persian: دهستان كرغند
- Rural District
- Location within Iran
- Coordinates: 33°51′N 58°44′E
- Country: Iran
- Province: South Khorasan
- County: Qaen
- District: Nimbeluk
- Established: 1993
- Capital: Karghond

Population (2016)
  - Total: 4,786
- Time zone: UTC+3:30 (IRST)

Karghond Rural District (Persian: دهستان كرغند) is in Nimbeluk District of Qaen County, South Khorasan province, Iran. Its capital is the village of Karghond.

== Demographics ==
=== Population ===
At the time of the 2006 National Census, the rural district's population was 4,508 in 1,258 households. There were 5,442 inhabitants in 1,578 households at the following census of 2011. The 2016 census measured the population of the rural district as 4,786 in 1,533 households. The most populous of its 15 villages was Karghond, with 2,852 people.

=== Other villages in the rural district ===
- Darreh-ye Baz
- Gazneshk
- Kalateh-ye Sari
- Kharmenj
- Khonj
- Khoshkan
