= Khunik-e Bala =

Khunik-e Bala خونيك بالا
- Village
- Location within Iran
- Coordinates: 33°46′12″N 59°20′42″E
- Country: Iran
- Province: South Khorasan
- County: Qaen
- Bakhsh: Central
- Rural District: Qaen

Population (2006)
  - Total: 74
- Time zone: UTC+3:30 (IRST)
  - Summer (DST): UTC+4:30 (IRDT)

Khunik-e Bala (Persian: خونيك بالا, also Romanized as Khūnīk-e Bālā and Khūnīk Bālā; also known as Khānaq-e Bālā, Khānaq-i-Bāla, and Khānaq) is a village in Qaen Rural District, in the Central District of Qaen County, South Khorasan Province, Iran. At the 2006 census, its population was 74, in 20 families.
