= Taghandik =

Village in South Khorasan province, Iran

Taghandik Persian: تغنديك
- Village
- Location within Iran
- Coordinates: 32°42′21″N 59°59′18″E
- Country: Iran
- Province: South Khorasan
- County: Darmian
- District: Central
- Rural District: Darmian

Population (2016)
  - Total: 44
- Time zone: UTC+3:30 (IRST)

Taghandik (Persian: تغنديك) (Note: Also romanized as Taghāndik; also known as Taghandak and Taqāndik) is a village in Darmian Rural District of the Central District in Darmian County, South Khorasan province, Iran.

== Demographics ==
=== Population ===
At the time of the 2006 National Census, the village's population was 102 in 29 households, when it was in Momenabad Rural District of the Central District in Sarbisheh County. The following census in 2011 counted 47 people in 11 households, by which time the village had been transferred to Darmian Rural District in the Central District of Darmian County. The 2016 census measured the population of the village as 44 people in 12 households.
