= Amir Mahyar Tafreshipour =

Iranian-Danish composer

Amir Mahyar Tafreshipour (born 1974) is an Iranian-Danish composer. His first opera The Doll behind the Curtain, based on a short story by Sadeq Hedayat (1903–1951), was premiered in London in 2015. A recording was made when performed at the Royal Danish Opera in 2020. by the Athelas Sinfonietta, conducted by Eirik Haukaas Ødegaard.
