= Esfian, Fars =

Esfian اسفيان
- Village
- Location within Iran
- Coordinates: 30°31′13″N 51°57′01″E
- Country: Iran
- Province: Fars
- County: Sepidan
- Bakhsh: Central
- Rural District: Komehr

Population (2006)
  - Total: 683
- Time zone: UTC+3:30 (IRST)
  - Summer (DST): UTC+4:30 (IRDT)

Esfian (Persian: اسفيان, also Romanized as Esfīān, Esfeyān, and Esfīyān) is a village in Komehr Rural District, in the Central District of Sepidan County, Fars province, Iran. At the 2006 census, its population was 683, in 146 families.
