= Khunik Zirak =

Khunik Zirak خونيك زيرك
- Village
- Location within Iran
- Coordinates: 33°02′35″N 59°26′35″E
- Country: Iran
- Province: South Khorasan
- County: Birjand
- Bakhsh: Central
- Rural District: Kahshang

Population (2006)
  - Total: 55
- Time zone: UTC+3:30 (IRST)
  - Summer (DST): UTC+4:30 (IRDT)

Khunik Zirak (Persian: خونیک زیرک, also Romanized as Khūnīk Zīrak; also known as Khūnīk and Khūnīk-e Zīrg) is a village in Kahshang Rural District, in the Central District of Birjand County, South Khorasan Province, Iran. At the 2016 census, its population was 88, in 32 families.
