= Deh-e Mir, Rudbar-e Jonubi =

Deh-e Mir ده مير
- Village
- Location within Iran
- Coordinates: 27°58′56″N 58°30′07″E
- Country: Iran
- Province: Kerman
- County: Rudbar-e Jonubi
- Bakhsh: Jazmurian
- Rural District: Kuhestan

Population (2006)
  - Total: 89
- Time zone: UTC+3:30 (IRST)
  - Summer (DST): UTC+4:30 (IRDT)

Deh-e Mir (Persian: ده مير, also Romanized as Deh-e Mīr, Deh-i-Mīr, and Deh Mīr; also known as Deh-e Mīz) is a village in Kuhestan Rural District, Jazmurian District, Rudbar-e Jonubi County, Kerman Province, Iran. At the 2006 census, its population was 89, in 30 families.
