= Deh Mir, Khusf =

Deh Mir ده مير
- Village
- Location within Iran
- Coordinates: 32°36′10″N 58°57′28″E
- Country: Iran
- Province: South Khorasan
- County: Khusf
- Bakhsh: Jolgeh-e Mazhan
- Rural District: Jolgeh-e Mazhan

Population (2006)
  - Total: 72
- Time zone: UTC+3:30 (IRST)
  - Summer (DST): UTC+4:30 (IRDT)

Deh Mir (Persian: ده مير, also Romanized as Deh Mīr; also known as Kalāteh-ye Mīr) is a village in Jolgeh-e Mazhan Rural District, Jolgeh-e Mazhan District, Khusf County, South Khorasan Province, Iran. At the 2006 census, its population was 72, in 27 families.
