= Deh-e Mir, Sirjan =

Deh-e Mir ده مير
- Village
- Location within Iran
- Coordinates: 29°37′43″N 55°27′31″E
- Country: Iran
- Province: Kerman
- County: Sirjan
- Bakhsh: Central
- Rural District: Zeydabad

Population (2006)
  - Total: 18
- Time zone: UTC+3:30 (IRST)
  - Summer (DST): UTC+4:30 (IRDT)

Deh-e Mir (Persian: ده مير, also Romanized as Deh-e Mīr and Deh Mīr) is a village in Zeydabad Rural District, in the Central District of Sirjan County, Kerman Province, Iran. At the 2006 census, its population was 18, in 4 families.
