= Deh Mir, Bampur =

Deh Mir دهمير
- Village
- Location within Iran
- Coordinates: 27°11′39″N 60°25′26″E
- Country: Iran
- Province: Sistan and Baluchestan
- County: Bampur
- Bakhsh: Central
- Rural District: Bampur-e Gharbi

Population (2006)
  - Total: 2,593
- Time zone: UTC+3:30 (IRST)
  - Summer (DST): UTC+4:30 (IRDT)

Deh Mir (Persian: دهمير, also Romanized as Deh Mīr; also known as Deh-e Mīr) is a village in Bampur-e Gharbi Rural District, Central District, Bampur County, Sistan and Baluchestan Province, Iran. At the 2006 census, its population was 2,593, in 519 families.
