= Darreh Sefid, Mamasani =

Darreh Sefid دره سفيد
- Village
- Location within Iran
- Coordinates: 30°09′19″N 51°43′39″E
- Country: Iran
- Province: Fars
- County: Mamasani
- Bakhsh: Central
- Rural District: Javid-e Mahuri

Population (2006)
  - Total: 53
- Time zone: UTC+3:30 (IRST)
  - Summer (DST): UTC+4:30 (IRDT)

Darreh Sefid (Persian: دره سفيد, also Romanized as Darreh Sefīd) is a village in Javid-e Mahuri Rural District, in the Central District of Mamasani County, Fars province, Iran. At the 2006 census, its population was 53, in 14 families.

== Geography ==
Darreh Sefid is located in the northern part of Iran, north of the capital Tehran, in the foothills of the Zagros Mountains.
