= Khanik, Sumay-ye Shomali =

Khanik خانيك
- Village
- Location within Iran
- Coordinates: 37°58′57″N 44°39′51″E
- Country: Iran
- Province: West Azerbaijan
- County: Urmia
- Bakhsh: Sumay-ye Beradust
- Rural District: Sumay-ye Shomali

Population (2006)
  - Total: 244
- Time zone: UTC+3:30 (IRST)
  - Summer (DST): UTC+4:30 (IRDT)

Khanik (Persian: خانيك, also Romanized as Khānīk) is a village in Sumay-ye Shomali Rural District, Sumay-ye Beradust District, Urmia County, West Azerbaijan Province, Iran. At the 2006 census, its population was 244, in 47 families.
