= Khunik, western Darmian =

Village in South Khorasan province, Iran

Khunik Persian: خونيك
- Village
- Location within Iran
- Country: Iran
- Province: South Khorasan
- County: Darmian
- District: Central
- Rural District: Darmian

Population (2016)
  - Total: 14
- Time zone: UTC+3:30 (IRST)

Khunik (Persian: خونيك) (Note: Also romanized as Khūnīk) is a village in Darmian Rural District of the Central District in Darmian County, South Khorasan province, Iran.

== Demographics ==
=== Population ===
At the time of the 2006 National Census, the village's population was 43 in 10 households. The following census in 2011 counted 19 people in five households. The 2016 census measured the population of the village as 14 people in four households.
