= Jajang, Iran =

Village in South Khorasan province, Iran

Jajang Persian: جاجنگ
- Village
- Location within Iran
- Coordinates: 32°47′59″N 59°56′25″E
- Country: Iran
- Province: South Khorasan
- County: Darmian
- District: Central
- Rural District: Darmian

Population (2016)
  - Total: 250
- Time zone: UTC+3:30 (IRST)

Jajang (Persian: جاجنگ) (Note: Also romanized as Jājang and Jājeng; also known as Chāchīng, Gājīn, and Jachang) is a village in Darmian Rural District of the Central District in Darmian County, South Khorasan province, Iran.

== Demographics ==
=== Population ===
At the time of the 2006 National Census, the village's population was 197 in 53 households. The following census in 2011 counted 192 people in 57 households. The 2016 census measured the population of the village as 250 people in 61 households.
