= Cheshmeh Bid Cheng Baradeh =

Cheshmeh Bid Cheng Baradeh چشمه بيدچنگ برده
- Village
- Location within Iran
- Coordinates: 33°39′59″N 48°12′14″E
- Country: Iran
- Province: Lorestan
- County: Khorramabad
- Bakhsh: Central
- Rural District: Robat

Population (2006)
  - Total: 64
- Time zone: UTC+3:30 (IRST)
  - Summer (DST): UTC+4:30 (IRDT)

Cheshmeh Bid Cheng Baradeh (Persian: چشمه بيدچنگ برده, also Romanized as Cheshmeh Bīd Cheng Baradeh; also known as Cheshmeh Bīd) is a village in Robat Rural District, in the Central District of Khorramabad County, Lorestan Province, Iran. At the 2006 census, its population was 64, in 16 families.
