= Hatamabad, Markazi =

Hatamabad حاتم اباد
- Village
- Location within Iran
- Coordinates: 34°23′51″N 49°45′35″E
- Country: Iran
- Province: Markazi
- County: Farahan
- Bakhsh: Central
- Rural District: Farmahin

Population (2006)
  - Total: 39
- Time zone: UTC+3:30 (IRST)
  - Summer (DST): UTC+4:30 (IRDT)

Hatamabad (Persian: حاتم اباد, also Romanized as Ḩātamābād) is a village in Farmahin Rural District, in the Central District of Farahan County, Markazi Province, Iran. At the 2006 census, its population was 39, in 20 families.
