= Cheshmeh Bid, Lorestan =

Cheshmeh Bid چشمه بيد
- Village
- Location within Iran
- Coordinates: 33°39′40″N 48°23′09″E
- Country: Iran
- Province: Lorestan
- County: Selseleh
- Bakhsh: Central
- Rural District: Honam

Population (2006)
  - Total: 151
- Time zone: UTC+3:30 (IRST)
  - Summer (DST): UTC+4:30 (IRDT)

Cheshmeh Bid (Persian: چشمه بيد, also Romanized as Cheshmeh Bīd; also known as Cheshmeh Bīd Rīmaleh) is a village in Honam Rural District, in the Central District of Selseleh County, Lorestan Province, Iran. At the 2006 census, its population was 151, in 28 families.
