= Hatamabad, Selseleh =

Hatamabad حاتم اباد
- Village
- Location within Iran
- Coordinates: 33°54′19″N 48°08′17″E
- Country: Iran
- Province: Lorestan
- County: Selseleh
- Bakhsh: Firuzabad
- Rural District: Firuzabad

Population (2006)
  - Total: 224
- Time zone: UTC+3:30 (IRST)
  - Summer (DST): UTC+4:30 (IRDT)

Hatamabad (Persian: حاتم اباد, also Romanized as Ḩātamābād) is a village in Firuzabad Rural District, Firuzabad District, Selseleh County, Lorestan Province, Iran. At the 2006 census, its population was 224, in 49 families.
