= Khunik, eastern Darmian =

Village in South Khorasan province, Iran

Khunik Persian: خونيك
- Village
- Location within Iran
- Coordinates: 32°40′55″N 60°05′43″E
- Country: Iran
- Province: South Khorasan
- County: Darmian
- District: Central
- Rural District: Darmian

Population (2016)
  - Total: 231
- Time zone: UTC+3:30 (IRST)

Khunik (Persian: خونيك) (Note: Also romanized as Khūnīk; also known as Khūnīkī) is a village in Darmian Rural District of the Central District in Darmian County, South Khorasan province, Iran.

== Demographics ==
=== Population ===
At the time of the 2006 National Census, the village's population was 246 in 51 households, when it was in Momenabad Rural District of the Central District in Sarbisheh County. The following census in 2011 counted 216 people in 48 households, by which time the village had been transferred to Darmian Rural District in the Central District of Darmian County. The 2016 census measured the population of the village as 231 people in 54 households.
