= Deh-e Mir, Dalgan =

Deh-e Mir دهمير
- Village
- Location within Iran
- Coordinates: 27°04′35″N 59°22′49″E
- Country: Iran
- Province: Sistan and Baluchestan
- County: Dalgan
- Bakhsh: Jolgeh-ye Chah Hashem
- Rural District: Jolgeh-ye Chah Hashem

Population (2006)
  - Total: 201
- Time zone: UTC+3:30 (IRST)
  - Summer (DST): UTC+4:30 (IRDT)

Deh-e Mir (Persian: دهمير, also Romanized as Deh-e Mīr) is a village in Jolgeh-ye Chah Hashem Rural District, Jolgeh-ye Chah Hashem District, Dalgan County, Sistan and Baluchestan Province, Iran. At the 2006 census, its population was 201, in 36 families.
