= Hatamabad, Chaharmahal and Bakhtiari =

Hatamabad حاتم اباد
- Village
- Country: Iran
- Province: Chaharmahal and Bakhtiari
- County: Lordegan
- Bakhsh: Manj
- Rural District: Barez

Population (2006)
  - Total: 257
- Time zone: UTC+3:30 (IRST)
  - Summer (DST): UTC+4:30 (IRDT)

Hatamabad (Persian: حاتم اباد, also Romanized as Ḩātamābād) is a village in Barez Rural District, Manj District, Lordegan County, Chaharmahal and Bakhtiari Province, Iran. At the 2006 census, its population was 257, in 45 families.
