= Shendan Expressway =

Expressway road

The Shendan Expressway (pinyin: Shendan Gaosu Gonglu) links Shenyang in China's Liaoning province with the border town of Dandong, sitting next to Sinŭiju in North Korea (DPRK).

The cities of Benxi, Nanfen, and Fenghuangcheng, as well as other localities, are located next to the expressway, heading slightly south-east.

A second expressway to Dandong is still partially under construction. This would run directly from Dalian and Zhuanghe.
