= Darreh Sefid, Sepidan =

Darreh Sefid دره سفيد
- Village
- Location within Iran
- Coordinates: 30°09′06″N 52°27′01″E
- Country: Iran
- Province: Fars
- County: Sepidan
- Bakhsh: Beyza
- Rural District: Banesh

Population (2006)
  - Total: 217
- Time zone: UTC+3:30 (IRST)
  - Summer (DST): UTC+4:30 (IRDT)

Darreh Sefid (Persian: دره سفيد, also Romanized as Darreh Sefīd) is a village in Banesh Rural District, Beyza District, Sepidan County, Fars province, Iran. At the 2006 census, its population was 217, in 40 families.
