= Bidmeshk, Sarbisheh =

Bidmeshk بيدمشك
- Village
- Location within Iran
- Coordinates: 32°35′22″N 59°23′02″E
- Country: Iran
- Province: South Khorasan
- County: Sarbisheh
- Bakhsh: Mud
- Rural District: Naharjan

Population (2006)
  - Total: 27
- Time zone: UTC+3:30 (IRST)
  - Summer (DST): UTC+4:30 (IRDT)

Bidmeshk (Persian: بيدمشك, also Romanized as Bīdmeshk, Bīdmishk, and Bīdmoshk) is a village in Naharjan Rural District, Mud District, Sarbisheh County, South Khorasan Province, Iran. According to the 2006 census, it had a population of 27 in 9 families.
