= Khunik (32°46′ N 59°22′ E), Baqeran =

Khunik خونيك
- Village
- Location within Iran
- Coordinates: 32°46′26″N 59°22′16″E
- Country: Iran
- Province: South Khorasan
- County: Birjand
- Bakhsh: Central
- Rural District: Baqeran

Population (2006)
  - Total: 90
- Time zone: UTC+3:30 (IRST)
  - Summer (DST): UTC+4:30 (IRDT)

Khunik (Persian: خونيك, also Romanized as Khūnīk and Khonik) is a village in Baqeran Rural District, in the Central District of Birjand County, South Khorasan Province, Iran. At the 2006 census, its population was 90, in 27 families.
