= Shandan, South Khorasan =

Village in South Khorasan province, Iran

Shandan Persian: شندان
- Village
- Location within Iran
- Coordinates: 33°45′14″N 58°47′08″E
- Country: Iran
- Province: South Khorasan
- County: Qaen
- District: Central
- Rural District: Pishkuh

Population (2016)
  - Total: 302
- Time zone: UTC+3:30 (IRST)

Shandan (Persian: شندان) (Note: Also romanized as Shandān and Shendān; also known as Shandān-e ‘Arab, Shandān-e Gharb, and Shandu) is a village in Pishkuh Rural District of the Central District in Qaen County, South Khorasan province, Iran.

== Demographics ==
=== Population ===
At the time of the 2006 National Census, the village's population was 302 in 76 households. The following census in 2011 counted 305 people in 85 households. The 2016 census measured the population of the village as 302 people in 92 households.
