= Khunik-e Pain, Nehbandan =

Khunik-e Pain خونيك پائين
- Village
- Location within Iran
- Coordinates: 31°28′16″N 60°06′05″E
- Country: Iran
- Province: South Khorasan
- County: Nehbandan
- Bakhsh: Central
- Rural District: Neh

Population (2006)
  - Total: 215
- Time zone: UTC+3:30 (IRST)
  - Summer (DST): UTC+4:30 (IRDT)

Khunik-e Pain (Persian: خونيك پائين, also Romanized as Khūnīk-e Pā’īn; also known as Khūnīk, Khonik Sofla, Khūng Soflá, and Khūnīk-e Soflá) is a village in Neh Rural District, in the Central District of Nehbandan County, South Khorasan Province, Iran. At the 2006 census, its population was 215, in 65 families.
