= Darmian Rural District =

Rural district in South Khorasan province, Iran

Darmian Rural District Persian: دهستان درميان
- Rural District
- Location within Iran
- Coordinates: 32°46′N 59°56′E
- Country: Iran
- Province: South Khorasan
- County: Darmian
- District: Central
- Established: 1987
- Capital: Darmian

Population (2016)
  - Total: 8,279
- Time zone: UTC+3:30 (IRST)

Darmian Rural District (Persian: دهستان درميان) is in the Central District of Darmian County, South Khorasan province, Iran. Its capital is the village of Darmian.

== Demographics ==
=== Population ===
At the time of the 2006 National Census, the rural district's population was 7,306 in 1,809 households. There were 7,640 inhabitants in 1,985 households at the following census of 2011. The 2016 census measured the population of the rural district as 8,279 in 2,185 households. The most populous of its 65 villages was Darmian, with 1,657 people.

=== Other villages in the rural district ===
- Daderan
- Eskandar
- Jajang
- Khunik (east)
- Khunik (west)
- Mohammadabad-e Olya
- Mohammadabad-e Sofla
- Mud-e Olya
- Sarshabad
- Taghandik
