= Shaskuh Rural District =

Rural district in South Khorasan province, Iran

Shaskuh Rural District Persian: دهستان شاسكوه
- Rural District
- Location within Iran
- Coordinates: 33°46′N 60°02′E
- Country: Iran
- Province: South Khorasan
- County: Zirkuh
- District: Shaskuh
- Established: 1986
- Capital: Abiz-e Jadid

Population (2016)
  - Total: 4,022
- Time zone: UTC+3:30 (IRST)

Shaskuh Rural District (Persian: دهستان شاسكوه) is in Shaskuh District of Zirkuh County, South Khorasan province, Iran. It is administered from the city of Abiz-e Jadid.

== Demographics ==
=== Population ===
At the time of the 2006 National Census, the rural district's population (as a part of the former Zirkuh District in Qaen County) was 8,329 in 2,043 households. There were 9,752 inhabitants in 2,562 households at the following census of 2011. The 2016 census measured the population of the rural district as 4,022 in 1,202 households, by which time the district had been separated from the county in the establishment of Zirkuh County. The rural district was transferred to the new Shaskuh District. The most populous of its five villages was Abiz-e Jadid (now a city), with 2,716 people.

- Chenaran-e Jadid
- Esfad-e Jadid
- Mirabad
- Now Deh
