= Mahyar Rural District =

Rural district in South Khorasan province, Iran

Mahyar Rural District Persian: دهستان مهيار
- Rural District
- Location within Iran
- Coordinates: 33°57′N 59°19′E
- Country: Iran
- Province: South Khorasan
- County: Qaen
- District: Central
- Established: 2002
- Capital: Mohammadabad-e Alam

Population (2016)
  - Total: 4,445
- Time zone: UTC+3:30 (IRST)

Mahyar Rural District (Persian: دهستان مهيار) is in the Central District of Qaen County, South Khorasan province, Iran. Its capital is the village of Mohammadabad-e Alam.

== Demographics ==
=== Population ===
At the time of the 2006 National Census, the rural district's population was 4,874 in 1,150 households. There were 4,610 inhabitants in 1,229 households at the following census of 2011. The 2016 census measured the population of the rural district as 4,445 in 1,323 households. The most populous of its 37 villages was Mohammadabad-e Alam, with 1,575 people.

=== Other villages in the rural district ===
- Bakhshabad
- Boznabad-e Jadid
- Hajjiabad-e Nughab
- Jabbar
- Kali
- Khorramabad
