= Nimbeluk Rural District =

Rural district in South Khorasan province, Iran

Nimbeluk Rural District Persian: دهستان نيمبلوك
- Rural District
- Location within Iran
- Coordinates: 33°59′N 58°58′E
- Country: Iran
- Province: South Khorasan
- County: Qaen
- District: Nimbeluk
- Established: 1986
- Capital: Nimbeluk

Population (2016)
  - Total: 4,563
- Time zone: UTC+3:30 (IRST)

Nimbeluk Rural District (Persian: دهستان نيمبلوك) is in Nimbeluk District of Qaen County, South Khorasan province, Iran. It is administered from the city of Nimbeluk. (Note: Formerly the village of Eslamabad)

== Demographics ==
=== Population ===
At the time of the 2006 National Census, the rural district's population was 5,072, living in 1,461 households. By following the census in 2011, the population had decreased to 4,556 inhabitants in 1,473. The 2016 census measured the population of the rural district as 4,563 in 1,553 households. The most populous of its 51 villages was Deheshk, with 1,597 people.

=== Other villages in the rural district ===
- Beskabad
- Binabaj
- Fathabad
- Gerimenj
- Kareshk
- Khug
- Mozdabad
