= Shaskuh District =

District in South Khorasan province, Iran

Shaskuh District Persian: بخش شاسکوه
- District
- Location within Iran
- Coordinates: 33°48′N 59°59′E
- Country: Iran
- Province: South Khorasan
- County: Zirkuh
- Established: 2011
- Capital: Abiz-e Jadid

Population (2016)
  - Total: 9,490
- Time zone: UTC+3:30 (IRST)

Shaskuh District (Persian: بخش شاسکوه) is in Zirkuh County, South Khorasan province, Iran. Its capital is the city of Abiz-e Jadid.

== History ==
In 2011, Zirkuh and Zohan Districts were separated from Qaen County in the establishment of Zirkuh County, which was divided into three districts of two rural districts each, with the city of Hajjiabad as its capital. The village of Abiz-e Jadid was converted to a city in 2018.

== Demographics ==
=== Population ===
At the time of the 2016 National Census, the district's population was 9,490 inhabitants in 2,720 households.

=== Administrative divisions ===
Shaskuh District Population
Administrative Divisions	2016
Bohnabad RD	5,468
Shaskuh RD	4,022
Abiz-e Jadid (city) (Note: Became a city after the 2016 census)	
Total	9,490
RD = Rural District
