= Qaen Rural District =

Rural district in South Khorasan province, Iran

Qaen Rural District Persian: دهستان قائن
- Rural District
- Location within Iran
- Coordinates: 33°44′N 59°24′E
- Country: Iran
- Province: South Khorasan
- County: Qaen
- District: Central
- Established: 1986
- Capital: Mahmui

Population (2016)
  - Total: 19,758
- Time zone: UTC+3:30 (IRST)

Qaen Rural District (Persian: دهستان قائن) is in the Central District of Qaen County, South Khorasan province, Iran. Its capital is the village of Mahmui.

== Demographics ==
=== Population ===
At the time of the 2006 National Census, the rural district's population was 18,252 in 4,826 households. There were 18,483 inhabitants in 5,610 households at the following census of 2011. The 2016 census measured the population of the rural district as 19,758 in 6,163 households. The most populous of its 69 villages was Esfeshad, with 2,900 people.

=== Other villages in the rural district ===
- Andarik
- Ebrahimabad
- Garmab
- Pahnai
- Shahik
- Shir Morgh
- Tigab
- Varezg
- Zul
