= Nimbeluk District =

District in South Khorasan province, Iran

Nimbeluk District Persian: بخش نیمبلوک
- District
- Location within Iran
- Coordinates: 33°57′N 58°58′E
- Country: Iran
- Province: South Khorasan
- County: Qaen
- Established: 1995
- Capital: Khezri Dasht Beyaz

Population (2016)
  - Total: 19,791
- Time zone: UTC+3:30 (IRST)

Nimbeluk District (Persian: بخش نیمبلوک) is in Qaen County, South Khorasan province, Iran. Its capital is the city of Khezri Dasht Beyaz.

== Demographics ==
=== Population ===
At the time of the 2006 National Census, the district's population was 18,396 in 5,050 households. The following census in 2011 counted 20,252 people in 5,841 households. The 2016 census measured the population of the district as 19,791 inhabitants in 6,087 households.

=== Administrative divisions ===
Nimbeluk District Population
Administrative Divisions	2006	2011	2016
Karghond RD	4,508	5,442	4,786
Nimbeluk RD	5,072	4,556	4,563
Khezri Dasht Beyaz (city)	4,930	5,761	5,680
Nimbeluk (city) (Note: Formerly the village of Eslamabad)	3,886	4,393	4,762
Total	18,396	20,152	19,791
RD = Rural District
