= Central District (Qaen County) =

District in South Khorasan province, Iran

Central District (Qaen County) Persian: بخش مرکزی شهرستان قائن
- District
- Location within Iran
- Coordinates: 33°46′N 59°10′E
- Country: Iran
- Province: South Khorasan
- County: Qaen
- Capital: Qaen

Population (2016)
  - Total: 73,917
- Time zone: UTC+3:30 (IRST)

The Central District of Qaen County (Persian: بخش مرکزی شهرستان قائن) is in South Khorasan province, Iran. Its capital is the city of Qaen.

== Demographics ==
=== Population ===
At the time of the 2006 National Census, the district's population was 62,040 in 16,239 households. The following census in 2011 counted 70,686 people in 19,432 households. The 2016 census measured the population of the district as 73,917 inhabitants in 21,798 households.

=== Administrative divisions ===
Central District (Qaen County) Population
Administrative Divisions	2006	2011	2016
Mahyar RD	4,874	4,610	4,445
Pishkuh RD	3,295	3,837	3,793
Qaen RD	18,252	18,483	19,758
Esfeden (city)	3,145	3,530	3,598
Qaen (city)	32,474	40,226	42,323
Total	62,040	70,686	73,917
RD = Rural District
