= Qaen County =

County in South Khorasan province, Iran

Qaen County Persian: شهرستان قائن
- County
- Artaguana Castle in Qaen County

- Location of Qaen County in South Khorasan province (top right, purple)

- Location of South Khorasan province in Iran
- Coordinates: 33°39′N 59°15′E
- Country: Iran
- Province: South Khorasan
- Capital: Qaen
- Districts: Central, Nimbeluk, Sedeh

Population (2016)
  - Total: 116,181
- Time zone: UTC+3:30 (IRST)

Qaen County (Persian: شهرستان قائن) (Note: Also known as Ghayen County) is in South Khorasan province, Iran. Its capital is the city of Qaen, known as "The Capital of Saffron."

== History ==
In 2011, Zirkuh and Zohan Districts were separated from the county in the establishment of Zirkuh County.

== Demographics ==
=== Population ===
At the time of the 2006 National Census, the county's population was 137,357 in 35,783 households. The following census in 2011 counted 152,401 people in 42,002 households. The 2016 census measured the population of the county as 116,181 in 34,794 households.

=== Administrative divisions ===
Qaen County's population history and administrative structure over three consecutive censuses are shown in the following table.

Qaen County Population
| Administrative Divisions | 2006 | 2011 | 2016 |
|---|---|---|---|
| Central District | 62,040 | 70,686 | 73,917 |
| Mahyar RD | 4,874 | 4,610 | 4,445 |
| Pishkuh RD | 3,295 | 3,837 | 3,793 |
| Qaen RD | 18,252 | 18,483 | 19,758 |
| Esfeden (city) | 3,145 | 3,530 | 3,598 |
| Qaen (city) | 32,474 | 40,226 | 42,323 |
| Nimbeluk District | 18,396 | 20,152 | 19,791 |
| Karghond RD | 4,508 | 5,442 | 4,786 |
| Nimbeluk RD | 5,072 | 4,556 | 4,563 |
| Khezri Dasht Beyaz (city) | 4,930 | 5,761 | 5,680 |
| Nimbeluk (city) (Note: Formerly the village of Eslamabad) | 3,886 | 4,393 | 4,762 |
| Sedeh District | 18,792 | 20,482 | 22,473 |
| Afriz RD | 5,765 | 6,276 | 7,123 |
| Paskuh RD | 6,407 | 7,357 | 8,441 |
| Sedeh RD | 3,569 | 3,264 | 3,180 |
| Arianshahr (city) (Note: Formerly the village of Sedeh) | 3,051 | 3,585 | 3,729 |
| Zirkuh District (Note: Transferred to Zirkuh County) | 26,203 | 29,844 | |
| Petergan RD | 5,865 | 6,375 | |
| Shaskuh RD | 8,329 | 9,752 | |
| Zirkuh RD | 7,676 | 7,799 | |
| Hajjiabad (city) | 4,333 | 5,918 | |
| Zohan District | 11,926 | 11,237 | |
| Afin RD | 5,311 | 4,760 | |
| Zohan RD | 5,908 | 5,058 | |
| Zohan (city) | 707 | 1,419 | |
| Total | 137,357 | 152,401 | 116,181 |
RD = Rural District

== See also ==
Media related to Qaen County at Wikimedia Commons
