= 1947 Dustabad earthquake =

Earthquake in Iran

- Location within Iran
- UTC time: 1947-09-23 12:28:15
- ISC event: 898039
- USGS-ANSS: ComCat
- Local date: 23 September 1947
- Magnitude: 6.9 M_{w}
- Depth: 15 km (9.3 mi)
- Epicenter: 33.604°N 58.642°E
- Areas affected: Iran
- Max. intensity: MMI VIII (Severe)
- Casualties: 500 fatalities

The 1947 Dustabad earthquake, also known as the Charmeh earthquake, occurred in South Khorasan province of northeastern Iran on 23 September. The mainshock had a magnitude of M_{w} 6.9 and maximum Modified Mercalli intensity of VIII (Severe). It was accompanied by a M_{w} 6.1 aftershock on 26 September. These earthquakes killed an estimated 500 people.

== Tectonic setting ==
Iran is situated within the Alpide belt, an active orogenic belt that spans the entire country. This tectonic environment is influenced by the oblique collision of the Arabian and Eurasian Plates at an estimated rate of 22 mm (0.87 in) annually. Iran is situated on the Eurasian plate, where it hosts complex zones of faults, forming tectonic blocks within the country. In southeastern Iran, the Arabian plate subducts beneath Iran along the Makran Trench. Shallow strike-slip and reverse faulting accommodate deformation in eastern Iran. Crustal shortening and thickening occur at fold and thrust belts along the Zagros, Alborz, and Kopet Dag ranges. Intraplate deformation occur, mainly displaying reverse faulting at the southern and northern parts of Iran to accommodate the convergence via crustal uplift and strike-slip faulting at the east and western ends where the Arabian plate slides past the adjacent crust. The tectonic setting contributes to shallow seismicity. South of latitude 34°, north–south trending dextral strike-slip faults occur in response to local dextral shear in the Dasht-e-Lut as central Iran moves northward relative to western Afghanistan. Sinistral strike-slip structures oriented east–west accommodes that deformation north of that latitude.

== Earthquake ==
The 23 September earthquake struck north of the Daqq-e-Muhammadabad, a small basin, where there are several north–south striking dextral faults. A 1982 report documented by Ambraseys and Melville, around 20 km (12 mi) of weathered surface faulting along one of these faults, known as the Dustabad Fault (also known as Chang Raqsh Fault), discovered in 1978, approximately 20 km (12 mi) east of the computed epicenter location. The surface rupture documented produced up to 1 m (3 ft 3 in) and 30–80 cm (12–31 in) of dextral and dip-slip displacements, respectively. Local residents also alleged that the surface rupture extended further north to Ishtakhr. Walker et al. stated that as the documentation occurred over 30 years following the earthquake, these features may not actually be associated with the 23 September 1947 mainshock. This also supported by global seismic data, through in poor quality, which did not support the idea of an epicenter along the Dustabad Fault.

Another set of northwest–southeast trending ground fractures was reported between Badamak and Gurab-e Jadid for about 6 km (3.7 mi). Its location coincided with the Ferdows Thrust fault's southeastern portion. This region is characterised by folded and thrusted molasse deposits from the Neogene. Berberian suggested that both aforementioned literatures did not account for the 26 September aftershock. As the Dustabad Fault is too short to produce an earthquake of comparable magnitude as the 23 September earthquake, it was likely the source of the aftershock. Destruction was also reported along the north–south trend of the fault. Meanwhile, the 23 September earthquake may have been produced along the Ferdows Thrust and levelled villages along its strike. Dustabad-e Bala experienced total devastation by the two earthquakes as it was located southwest of the Ferdows Thrust and north of the Dustabad Fault.

== Impact ==
The earthquake affected a sparsely populated region where most population centers were remote and small desert settlements. The total number of deaths is unknown as some villages confirmed fatalities but did not provide figures, though at least 500 people were killed. The affected region was constrained to within a 65 km (40 mi) by 28 km (17 mi), oval-shaped area oriented north-northwest–south-southeast. Small settlements were destroyed and in the villages of Charmeh and Sarayan, there were eight and two deaths, respectively. Two hundred people died and another 100 were injured in Dustabad; further devastation occurred to the southeast and there was also damage in Ferdows. The maximum Modified Mercalli intensity exceeded VIII (Severe) in seven villages including Badamuk, Bostaq, Charmeh, Dustabad, Estakhr, Gurab-e Jadid and Mārkuh. Along with effects of the 26 September aftershock, Dustabad was totally razed and most casualties were reported there. In Tighab, which was damaged by both events and three people died, the aftershock exceeded VII (Very strong).

== See also ==
- List of earthquakes in 1947
- List of earthquakes in Iran
