= Ali Rahmani, Iran =

Ali Rahmani علي رحماني
- Village
- Country: Iran
- Province: South Khorasan
- County: Qaen
- Bakhsh: Sedeh
- Rural District: Sedeh

Population (2006)
  - Total: 10
- Time zone: UTC+3:30 (IRST)
  - Summer (DST): UTC+4:30 (IRDT)

Ali Rahmani (Persian: علي رحماني, also Romanized as ʿAlī Raḥmānī) is a village in Sedeh Rural District, Sedeh District, Qaen County, South Khorasan Province, Iran. At the 2006 census, its population was 10, in 5 families.
