= Torsh Ap =

Village in South Khorasan province, Iran

Torsh Ap Persian: ترش اپ
- Village
- Country: Iran
- Province: South Khorasan
- County: Sarayan
- District: Seh Qaleh
- Rural District: Dokuheh

Population (2016)
  - Total: 0
- Time zone: UTC+3:30 (IRST)

Torsh Ap (Persian: ترش اپ) (Note: Also romanized as Torsh Āp) is a village in Dokuheh Rural District of Seh Qaleh District in Sarayan County, South Khorasan province, Iran.

== Demographics ==
=== Population ===
At the time of the 2006 National Census, the village's population was 26 in six households. The village did not appear in the following census of 2011. The 2016 census measured the population of the village as zero.
