= Khurzad =

Village in South Khorasan province, Iran

Khurzad Persian: خورزاد
- Village
- Location within Iran
- Coordinates: 34°00′07″N 58°32′08″E
- Country: Iran
- Province: South Khorasan
- County: Sarayan
- District: Aysak
- Rural District: Masabi

Population (2016)
  - Total: 56
- Time zone: UTC+3:30 (IRST)

Khurzad (Persian: خورزاد) (Note: Also romanized as Khūrzād; also known as Khūrzād-e Bālā) is a village in Masabi Rural District of Aysak District (Note: Known before 2008 as the Central District of Sarayan County) in Sarayan County, South Khorasan province, Iran.

== Demographics ==
=== Population ===
At the time of the 2006 National Census, the village's population was 157 in 51 households. The following census in 2011 counted 74 people in 34 households. The 2016 census measured the population of the village as 56 people in 29 households.
