= Jahanabad, South Khorasan =

Village in South Khorasan province, Iran

Jahanabad Persian: جهان آباد
- Village
- Country: Iran
- Province: South Khorasan
- County: Sarayan
- District: Seh Qaleh
- Rural District: Dokuheh

Population (2016)
  - Total: 0
- Time zone: UTC+3:30 (IRST)

Jahanabad (Persian: جهان آباد) (Note: Also romanized as Jahānābād) is a village in Dokuheh Rural District of Seh Qaleh District in Sarayan County, South Khorasan province, Iran.

== Demographics ==
=== Population ===
At the time of the 2006 National Census, the village's population was 24 in six households. The following census in 2011 counted 27 people in seven households. The 2016 census measured the population of the village as zero.
