= Naram, South Khorasan =

Village in South Khorasan province, Iran

Naram Persian: نرم
- Village
- Location within Iran
- Coordinates: 34°00′54″N 58°26′11″E
- Country: Iran
- Province: South Khorasan
- County: Sarayan
- District: Aysak
- Rural District: Masabi

Population (2016)
  - Total: 60
- Time zone: UTC+3:30 (IRST)

Naram (Persian: نرم) is a village in Masabi Rural District of Aysak District (Note: Known before 2008 as the Central District of Sarayan County) in Sarayan County, South Khorasan province, Iran.

== Demographics ==
=== Population ===
At the time of the 2006 National Census, the village's population was 112 in 40 households. The following census in 2011 counted 56 people in 26 households. The 2016 census measured the population of the village as 60 people in 27 households.
