= Baghdadeh =

Village in South Khorasan province, Iran

Baghdadeh Persian: بغداده
- Village
- Location within Iran
- Coordinates: 33°46′21″N 58°19′03″E
- Country: Iran
- Province: South Khorasan
- County: Sarayan
- District: Aysak
- Rural District: Aysak

Population (2016)
  - Total: 1,808
- Time zone: UTC+3:30 (IRST)

Baghdadeh (Persian: بغداده) (Note: Also romanized as Baghdādeh; also known as Bagdâde, Baghdād, and Baghdadi)) is a village in Aysak Rural District of Aysak District (Note: Known before 2008 as the Central District of Sarayan County) in Sarayan County, South Khorasan province, Iran.

== Demographics ==
=== Population ===
At the time of the 2006 National Census, the village's population was 1,661 in 406 households. The following census in 2011 counted 1,740 people in 505 households. The 2016 census measured the population of the village as 1,808 people in 548 households, the most populous in its rural district.
