= Karimu =

Village in South Khorasan province, Iran

Karimu Persian: كريمو
- Village
- Location within Iran
- Coordinates: 34°01′54″N 58°30′15″E
- Country: Iran
- Province: South Khorasan
- County: Sarayan
- District: Aysak
- Rural District: Masabi

Population (2016)
  - Total: 679
- Time zone: UTC+3:30 (IRST)

Karimu (Persian: كريمو) (Note: Also romanized as Karīmū) is a village in Masabi Rural District of Aysak District (Note: Known before 2008 as the Central District of Sarayan County) in Sarayan County, South Khorasan province, Iran.

== Demographics ==
=== Population ===
At the time of the 2006 National Census, the village's population was 801 in 287 households. The following census in 2011 counted 742 people in 289 households. The 2016 census measured the population of the village as 679 people in 282 households, the most populous in its rural district.
