= Shahrak-e Shahid Dastghib, South Khorasan =

Village in South Khorasan province, Iran

Shahrak-e Shahid Dastghib Persian: شهرك شهيددستغيب
- Village
- Location within Iran
- Coordinates: 33°44′21″N 58°20′35″E
- Country: Iran
- Province: South Khorasan
- County: Sarayan
- District: Seh Qaleh
- Rural District: Seh Qaleh

Population (2016)
  - Total: 179
- Time zone: UTC+3:30 (IRST)

Shahrak-e Shahid Dastghib (Persian: شهرك شهيددستغيب) (Note: Also romanized as Shahraḵ-e Shahīd Dastghīb) is a village in Seh Qaleh Rural District of Seh Qaleh District in Sarayan County, South Khorasan province, Iran.

== Demographics ==
=== Population ===
At the time of the 2006 National Census, the village's population was 266 in 64 households. The following census in 2011 counted 223 people in 76 households. The 2016 census measured the population of the village as 179 people in 59 households.
