= Jolgeh =

Jolgeh (Persian: جلگه) may refer to:

- Jolgeh District
- Jolgeh Rural District (disambiguation)
- Jolgeh-ye Musaabad Rural District
- Jolgeh Sedeh
