= Chah Terikhi =

Village in South Khorasan province, Iran

Chah Terikhi Persian: چاه تريخي
- Village
- Location within Iran
- Coordinates: 33°14′45″N 58°37′35″E
- Country: Iran
- Province: South Khorasan
- County: Sarayan
- District: Seh Qaleh
- Rural District: Dokuheh

Population (2016)
  - Total: 128
- Time zone: UTC+3:30 (IRST)

Chah Terikhi (Persian: چاه تريخي) (Note: Also romanized as Chāh Terīkhī) is a village in Dokuheh Rural District of Seh Qaleh District in Sarayan County, South Khorasan province, Iran.

== Demographics ==
=== Population ===
At the time of the 2006 National Census, the village's population was 273 in 71 households. The following census in 2011 counted 182 people in 48 households. The 2016 census measured the population of the village as 128 people in 39 households.
