= Aba Mansuri =

Village in South Khorasan province, Iran

Aba Mansuri Persian: ابامنصوري
- Village
- Location within Iran
- Coordinates: 33°58′54″N 58°34′15″E
- Country: Iran
- Province: South Khorasan
- County: Sarayan
- District: Aysak
- Rural District: Masabi

Population (2016)
  - Total: 0
- Time zone: UTC+3:30 (IRST)

Aba Mansuri (Persian: ابامنصوري) (Note: Also romanized as Abā Manşūrī) is a village in Masabi Rural District of Aysak District (Note: Known before 2008 as the Central District of Sarayan County) in Sarayan County, South Khorasan province, Iran.

== Demographics ==
=== Population ===
At the time of the 2006 National Census, the village's population was 16 in six households. The following census in 2011 counted a population below the reporting threshold. The 2016 census measured the population of the village as zero.
