= Cheshmeh-ye Seyyed =

Village in South Khorasan province, Iran

Cheshmeh-ye Seyyed Persian: چشمه سيد
- Village
- Country: Iran
- Province: South Khorasan
- County: Sarayan
- District: Aysak
- Rural District: Aysak

Population (2016)
  - Total: 0
- Time zone: UTC+3:30 (IRST)

Cheshmeh-ye Seyyed (Persian: چشمه سيد) (Note: Formerly known as Cheshmeh-ye Si (چشمه سي)) is a village in Aysak Rural District of Aysak District (Note: Known before 2008 as the Central District of Sarayan County) in Sarayan County, South Khorasan province, Iran.

== Demographics ==
=== Population ===
At the time of the 2006 National Census, the village's population, as Cheshmeh-ye Si, was 77 in 18 households. The village did not appear in the following census of 2011. The 2016 census measured the population of the village as zero, by which time it was listed as Cheshmeh-ye Seyyed.
