= Bani Khanik =

Village in South Khorasan province, Iran

Bani Khanik Persian: بني خانيك
- Village
- Location within Iran
- Coordinates: 33°57′35″N 58°31′55″E
- Country: Iran
- Province: South Khorasan
- County: Sarayan
- District: Aysak
- Rural District: Aysak

Population (2016)
  - Total: 100
- Time zone: UTC+3:30 (IRST)

Bani Khanik (Persian: بني خانيك) (Note: Also romanized as Banī Khānīk; also known as Bani Khūng) is a village in Aysak Rural District of Aysak District (Note: Known before 2008 as the Central District of Sarayan County) in Sarayan County, South Khorasan province, Iran.

== Demographics ==
=== Population ===
At the time of the 2006 National Census, the village's population was 118 in 43 households. The following census in 2011 counted 95 people in 40 households. The 2016 census measured the population of the village as 100 people in 42 households.
