= Zari Chah =

Village in South Khorasan province, Iran

Zari Chah Persian: زري چاه
- Village
- Location within Iran
- Coordinates: 31°37′12″N 59°26′46″E
- Country: Iran
- Province: South Khorasan
- County: Sarayan
- District: Seh Qaleh
- Rural District: Dokuheh

Population (2016)
  - Total: 13
- Time zone: UTC+3:30 (IRST)

Zari Chah (Persian: زري چاه) (Note: Also romanized as Zarī Chāh) is a village in Dokuheh Rural District of Seh Qaleh District in Sarayan County, South Khorasan province, Iran.

== Demographics ==
=== Population ===
At the time of the 2006 National Census, the village's population was 91 in 28 households. The following census in 2011 counted 39 people in 11 households. The 2016 census measured the population of the village as 13 people in four households.
