= Aspur =

Village in South Khorasan province, Iran

Aspur Persian: اسپور
- Village
- Location within Iran
- Coordinates: 33°55′17″N 58°37′19″E
- Country: Iran
- Province: South Khorasan
- County: Sarayan
- District: Aysak
- Rural District: Aysak

Population (2016)
  - Total: 0
- Time zone: UTC+3:30 (IRST)

Aspur (Persian: اسپور) (Note: Also romanized as Āspūr; also known as Aspār) is a village in Aysak Rural District of Aysak District (Note: Known before 2008 as the Central District of Sarayan County) in Sarayan County, South Khorasan province, Iran.

== Demographics ==
=== Population ===
At the time of the 2006 National Census, the village's population was 19 in seven households. The village did not appear in the following census of 2011. The 2016 census measured the population of the village as zero.
