= Chah Paniri =

Village in South Khorasan province, Iran

Chah Paniri Persian: چاه پنيري
- Village
- Location within Iran
- Coordinates: 33°14′25″N 58°35′41″E
- Country: Iran
- Province: South Khorasan
- County: Sarayan
- District: Seh Qaleh
- Rural District: Dokuheh

Population (2016)
  - Total: 32
- Time zone: UTC+3:30 (IRST)

Chah Paniri (Persian: چاه پنيري) (Note: Also romanized as Chāh Panīrī) is a village in Dokuheh Rural District of Seh Qaleh District in Sarayan County, South Khorasan province, Iran.

== Demographics ==
=== Population ===
At the time of the 2006 National Census, the village's population was 106 in 29 households. The following census in 2011 counted 50 people in 15 households. The 2016 census measured the population of the village as 32 people in 12 households.
