= Ravij =

Village in South Khorasan province, Iran

Ravij Persian: راويج
- Village
- Location within Iran
- Country: Iran
- Province: South Khorasan
- County: Sarayan
- District: Seh Qaleh
- Rural District: Dokuheh

Population (2016)
  - Total: 0
- Time zone: UTC+3:30 (IRST)

Ravij (Persian: راويج) (Note: Also romanized as Rāvīj; also known as Rāvīj Chāh Ţāleb) is a village in Dokuheh Rural District of Seh Qaleh District in Sarayan County, South Khorasan province, Iran.

== Demographics ==
=== Population ===
At the time of the 2006 National Census, the village's population was 102 in 20 households. The village did not appear in the following census of 2011. The 2016 census measured the population of the village as zero.
