= Kuh Miran =

Kuh Miran كوه ميران
- Village
- Location within Iran
- Coordinates: 33°26′52″N 58°51′16″E
- Country: Iran
- Province: South Khorasan
- County: Qaen
- Bakhsh: Sedeh
- Rural District: Afriz

Population (2006)
  - Total: 140
- Time zone: UTC+3:30 (IRST)
  - Summer (DST): UTC+4:30 (IRDT)

Kuh Miran (Persian: كوه ميران, also Romanized as Kūh Mīrān; also known as Komīrān) is a village in Afriz Rural District, Sedeh District, Qaen County, South Khorasan Province, Iran. At the 2006 census, its population was 140, in 29 families.
