= Zanagu, South Khorasan =

Village in South Khorasan province, Iran

Zanagu Persian: زنگو
- Village
- Location within Iran
- Coordinates: 33°46′41″N 58°33′57″E
- Country: Iran
- Province: South Khorasan
- County: Sarayan
- District: Seh Qaleh
- Rural District: Seh Qaleh

Population (2016)
  - Total: 590
- Time zone: UTC+3:30 (IRST)

Zanagu (Persian: زنگو) (Note: Also romanized as Zanagū; also known as Zanakū) is a village in Seh Qaleh Rural District of Seh Qaleh District in Sarayan County, South Khorasan province, Iran.

== Demographics ==
=== Population ===
At the time of the 2006 National Census, the village's population was 569 in 150 households. The following census in 2011 counted 555 people in 166 households. The 2016 census measured the population of the village as 590 people in 182 households.
