= Cheshmeh-ye Sarmandali =

Village in South Khorasan province, Iran

Cheshmeh-ye Sarmandali Persian: چشمه سرمندلي
- Village
- Country: Iran
- Province: South Khorasan
- County: Sarayan
- District: Seh Qaleh
- Rural District: Dokuheh

Population (2016)
  - Total: 0
- Time zone: UTC+3:30 (IRST)

Cheshmeh-ye Sarmandali (Persian: چشمه سرمندلي) (Note: Also romanized as Cheshmeh-ye Sarmandalī) is a village in Dokuheh Rural District of Seh Qaleh District in Sarayan County, South Khorasan province, Iran.

== Demographics ==
=== Population ===
At the time of the 2006 National Census, the village's population was 55 in 17 households. The village did not appear in the following census of 2011. The 2016 census measured the population of the village as zero.
