= Amrui =

Village in South Khorasan province, Iran

Amrui Persian: عمرويي
- Village
- Location within Iran
- Coordinates: 33°46′09″N 58°20′42″E
- Country: Iran
- Province: South Khorasan
- County: Sarayan
- District: Aysak
- Rural District: Aysak

Population (2016)
  - Total: 352
- Time zone: UTC+3:30 (IRST)

Amrui (Persian: عمرويي) (Note: Also romanized as ‘Amrū’ī; also known as Amruni and Imrūni) is a village in Aysak Rural District of Aysak District (Note: Known before 2008 as the Central District of Sarayan County) in Sarayan County, South Khorasan province, Iran.

== Demographics ==
=== Population ===
At the time of the 2006 National Census, the village's population was 329 in 74 households. The following census in 2011 counted 318 people in 95 households. The 2016 census measured the population of the village as 352 people in 106 households.
