= Hojjatabad, Sarayan =

Village in South Khorasan province, Iran

Hojjatabad Persian: حجت اباد
- Village
- Location within Iran
- Coordinates: 33°45′50″N 58°20′01″E
- Country: Iran
- Province: South Khorasan
- County: Sarayan
- District: Aysak
- Rural District: Aysak

Population (2016)
  - Total: 109
- Time zone: UTC+3:30 (IRST)

Hojjatabad (Persian: حجت‌آباد) (Note: Also romanized as Ḩojjatābād) is a village in Aysak Rural District of Aysak District (Note: Known before 2008 as the Central District of Sarayan County) in Sarayan County, South Khorasan province, Iran.

== Demographics ==
=== Population ===
At the time of the 2006 National Census, the village's population was 103 in 28 households. The following census in 2011 counted 89 people in 24 households. The 2016 census measured the population of the village as 109 people in 35 households.
