= Now Bahar, South Khorasan =

Village in South Khorasan province, Iran

Now Bahar Persian: نوبهار
- Village
- Location within Iran
- Coordinates: 34°00′10″N 58°32′59″E
- Country: Iran
- Province: South Khorasan
- County: Sarayan
- District: Aysak
- Rural District: Masabi

Population (2016)
  - Total: 148
- Time zone: UTC+3:30 (IRST)

Now Bahar (Persian: نوبهار) (Note: Also romanized as Now Bahār) is a village in Masabi Rural District of Aysak District (Note: Known before 2008 as the Central District of Sarayan County) in Sarayan County, South Khorasan province, Iran.

== Demographics ==
=== Population ===
At the time of the 2006 National Census, the village's population was 195 in 63 households. The following census in 2011 counted 158 people in 60 households. The 2016 census measured the population of the village as 148 people in 62 households.
