= Sarab, Qaen =

Sarab سراب
- Village
- Location within Iran
- Coordinates: 33°31′46″N 59°07′40″E
- Country: Iran
- Province: South Khorasan
- County: Qaen
- Bakhsh: Sedeh
- Rural District: Afriz

Population (2006)
  - Total: 185
- Time zone: UTC+3:30 (IRST)
  - Summer (DST): UTC+4:30 (IRDT)

Sarab (Persian: سراب, also Romanized as Sarāb; also known as Sūrab) is a village in Afriz Rural District, Sedeh District, Qaen County, South Khorasan Province, Iran. At the 2006 census, its population was 185, in 46 families.
