= Howz-e Hafez =

Village in South Khorasan province, Iran

Howz-e Hafez Persian: حوض حافظ
- Village
- Location within Iran
- Country: Iran
- Province: South Khorasan
- County: Sarayan
- District: Seh Qaleh
- Rural District: Dokuheh

Population (2016)
  - Total: 0
- Time zone: UTC+3:30 (IRST)

Howz-e Hafez (Persian: حوض حافظ) (Note: Also romanized as Ḩowẕ-e Ḩāfez̧, Ḩowz-e Ḩāfez̧; also known as Hauz-i-Hāfiz) is a village in Dokuheh Rural District of Seh Qaleh District in Sarayan County, South Khorasan province, Iran.

== Demographics ==
=== Population ===
At the time of the 2006 National Census, the village's population was 20 in four households. The village did not appear in the following census of 2011. The 2016 census measured the population of the village as zero.
