= Now Deh, Sarayan =

Village in South Khorasan province, Iran

Now Deh Persian: نوده
- Village
- Location within Iran
- Coordinates: 34°02′09″N 58°26′42″E
- Country: Iran
- Province: South Khorasan
- County: Sarayan
- District: Aysak
- Rural District: Masabi

Population (2016)
  - Total: 111
- Time zone: UTC+3:30 (IRST)

Now Deh (Persian: نوده) is a village in Masabi Rural District of Aysak District (Note: Known before 2008 as the Central District of Sarayan County) in Sarayan County, South Khorasan province, Iran.

== Demographics ==
=== Population ===
At the time of the 2006 National Census, the village's population was 180 in 75 households. The following census in 2011 counted 109 people in 61 households. The 2016 census measured the population of the village as 111 people in 59 households.
