= Istu Chah =

Village in South Khorasan province, Iran

Istu Chah Persian: ايستوچاه
- Village
- Location within Iran
- Country: Iran
- Province: South Khorasan
- County: Sarayan
- District: Seh Qaleh
- Rural District: Dokuheh

Population (2016)
  - Total: 0
- Time zone: UTC+3:30 (IRST)

Istu Chah (Persian: ايستوچاه) (Note: Also romanized as Īstu Chāh) is a village in Dokuheh Rural District of Seh Qaleh District in Sarayan County, South Khorasan province, Iran.

== Demographics ==
=== Population ===
At the time of the 2006 National Census, the village's population was 93 in 21 households. The village did not appear in the following census of 2011. The 2016 census measured the population of the village as zero.
