= Aviz, South Khorasan =

Village in South Khorasan province, Iran

Aviz Persian: اويز
- Village
- Location within Iran
- Coordinates: 33°58′29″N 58°31′45″E
- Country: Iran
- Province: South Khorasan
- County: Sarayan
- District: Aysak
- Rural District: Aysak

Population (2016)
  - Total: 17
- Time zone: UTC+3:30 (IRST)

Aviz (Persian: اويز) (Note: Also romanized as Āvīz and Avīz) is a village in Aysak Rural District of Aysak District (Note: Known before 2008 as the Central District of Sarayan County) in Sarayan County, South Khorasan province, Iran.

== Demographics ==
=== Population ===
At the time of the 2006 National Census, the village's population was 18 in nine households. The following census in 2011 counted 19 people in nine households. The 2016 census measured the population of the village as 17 people in eight households.
