= Gushmir =

Village in South Khorasan province, Iran

Gushmir Persian: گوش مير
- Village
- Location within Iran
- Coordinates: 33°29′14″N 58°31′37″E
- Country: Iran
- Province: South Khorasan
- County: Sarayan
- District: Seh Qaleh
- Rural District: Dokuheh

Population (2016)
  - Total: Below reporting threshold
- Time zone: UTC+3:30 (IRST)

Gushmir (Persian: گوش مير) (Note: Also romanized as Gushmīr; also known as Chāh-e Gushmīr and Chāh-i-Gushmīr) is a village in Dokuheh Rural District of Seh Qaleh District in Sarayan County, South Khorasan province, Iran.

== Demographics ==
=== Population ===
At the time of the 2006 National Census, the village's population was 114 in 29 households. The following census in 2011 counted 58 people in 15 households. The 2016 census measured the population of the village as below the reporting threshold.
