= Chah Talab =

Village in South Khorasan province, Iran

Chah Talab Persian: چاه طالب
- Village
- Location within Iran
- Coordinates: 33°27′00″N 58°37′34″E
- Country: Iran
- Province: South Khorasan
- County: Sarayan
- District: Seh Qaleh
- Rural District: Dokuheh

Population (2016)
  - Total: 112
- Time zone: UTC+3:30 (IRST)

Chah Talab (Persian: چاه طالب) (Note: Also romanized as Chāh Ţālab) is a village in, and the capital of, Dokuheh Rural District in Seh Qaleh District of Sarayan County, South Khorasan province, Iran.

== Demographics ==
=== Population ===
At the time of the 2006 National Census, the village's population was 216 in 45 households. The following census in 2011 counted 110 people in 30 households. The 2016 census measured the population of the village as 112 people in 32 households.
