= Howz-e Galurshur =

Village in South Khorasan province, Iran

Howz-e Galurshur Persian: حوض گلورشور
- Village
- Location within Iran
- Country: Iran
- Province: South Khorasan
- County: Sarayan
- District: Seh Qaleh
- Rural District: Dokuheh

Population (2016)
  - Total: 0
- Time zone: UTC+3:30 (IRST)

Howz-e Galurshur (Persian: حوض گلورشور) (Note: Also romanized as Ḩowẕ-e Galūrshūr; also known as Ḩowẕ-e Galūshūr; also known as Hauz-i Galūshūr) is a village in Dokuheh Rural District of Seh Qaleh District in Sarayan County, South Khorasan province, Iran.

== Demographics ==
=== Population ===
At the time of the 2006 National Census, the village's population was 26 in four households. The village did not appear in the following census of 2011. The 2016 census measured the population of the village as zero.
