= Khavar-e Pain =

Village in South Khorasan province, Iran

Khavar-e Pain Persian: خاورپايين
- Village
- Location within Iran
- Coordinates: 34°00′02″N 58°35′05″E
- Country: Iran
- Province: South Khorasan
- County: Sarayan
- District: Aysak
- Rural District: Masabi

Population (2016)
  - Total: Below reporting threshold
- Time zone: UTC+3:30 (IRST)

Khavar-e Pain (Persian: خاورپايين) (Note: Also romanized as Khāvar-e Pā’īn) is a village in Masabi Rural District of Aysak District (Note: Known before 2008 as the Central District of Sarayan County) in Sarayan County, South Khorasan province, Iran.

== Demographics ==
=== Population ===
At the time of the 2006 National Census, the village's population was 99 in 29 households. The following census in 2011 counted 28 people in 10 households. The 2016 census measured the population of the village as below the reporting threshold.
