= Azdak =

Village in South Khorasan province, Iran

Azdak Persian: ازدك
- Village
- Location within Iran
- Coordinates: 33°55′04″N 58°35′34″E
- Country: Iran
- Province: South Khorasan
- County: Sarayan
- District: Aysak
- Rural District: Aysak

Population (2016)
  - Total: 0
- Time zone: UTC+3:30 (IRST)

Azdak (Persian: ازدك) (Note: Also romanized as Āzdaḵ; also known as Azdaq) is a village in Aysak Rural District of Aysak District (Note: Known before 2008 as the Central District of Sarayan County) in Sarayan County, South Khorasan province, Iran.

== Demographics ==
=== Population ===
At the time of the 2006 National Census, the village's population was 10 in five households. The following census in 2011 counted a population below the reporting threshold. The 2016 census measured the population of the village as zero.
