= Kalateh-ye Dallakan =

Kalateh-ye Dallakan كلاته دلاكان
- Village
- Location within Iran
- Coordinates: 33°16′05″N 59°12′31″E
- Country: Iran
- Province: South Khorasan
- County: Qaen
- Bakhsh: Sedeh
- Rural District: Sedeh

Population (2006)
  - Total: 86
- Time zone: UTC+3:30 (IRST)
  - Summer (DST): UTC+4:30 (IRDT)

Kalateh-ye Dallakan (Persian: كلاته دلاكان, also Romanized as Kalāteh-ye Dallākān; also known as Dāllākān, Dalākān, and Dallākān) is a village in Sedeh Rural District, Sedeh District, Qaen County, South Khorasan Province, Iran. At the 2006 census, its population was 86, in 24 families.
