= Band-e Now-e Do =

Village in South Khorasan province, Iran

Band-e Now-e Do Persian: بندنو2
- Village
- Location within Iran
- Coordinates: 33°21′00″N 58°47′29″E
- Country: Iran
- Province: South Khorasan
- County: Sarayan
- District: Seh Qaleh
- Rural District: Dokuheh

Population (2016)
  - Total: 17
- Time zone: UTC+3:30 (IRST)

Band-e Now-e Do (Persian: بندنو2) is a village in Dokuheh Rural District of Seh Qaleh District in Sarayan County, South Khorasan province, Iran.

== Demographics ==
=== Population ===
At the time of the 2006 National Census, the village's population was 102 in 20 households. The following census in 2011 counted 29 people in seven households. The 2016 census measured the population of the village as 17 people in five households.
