= Chah Ghiyas =

Village in South Khorasan province, Iran

Chah Ghiyas Persian: چاه غياث
- Village
- Location within Iran
- Coordinates: 33°16′19″N 58°44′10″E
- Country: Iran
- Province: South Khorasan
- County: Sarayan
- District: Seh Qaleh
- Rural District: Dokuheh

Population (2016)
  - Total: 321
- Time zone: UTC+3:30 (IRST)

Chah Ghiyas (Persian: چاه غياث) (Note: Also romanized as Chāh Ghīās̄) is a village in Dokuheh Rural District of Seh Qaleh District in Sarayan County, South Khorasan province, Iran.

== Demographics ==
=== Population ===
At the time of the 2006 National Census, the village's population was 418 in 78 households. The following census in 2011 counted 288 people in 70 households. The 2016 census measured the population of the village as 321 people in 75 households, the most populous in its rural district.
