= Shevengan =

Shevengan شونگان
- Village
- Location within Iran
- Coordinates: 33°14′27″N 58°51′37″E
- Country: Iran
- Province: South Khorasan
- County: Qaen
- Bakhsh: Sedeh
- Rural District: Afriz

Population (2006)
  - Total: 108
- Time zone: UTC+3:30 (IRST)
  - Summer (DST): UTC+4:30 (IRDT)

Shevengan (Persian: شونگان, also Romanized as Shevengān; also known as Chāh-i-Shungūn) is a village in Afriz Rural District, Sedeh District, Qaen County, South Khorasan Province, Iran. At the 2006 census, its population was 108, in 28 families.
