= AUJ =

AUJ or Auj may refer to:

- Auj, a village in Iran
- Austrojet (ICAO code: AUJ), an Austrian charter airline
- Awjila language (ISO 639-3 code: auj), a Berber language of Libya
- The Hobbit: An Unexpected Journey, a 2012 fantasy film
- Auj, is an expression with a variety of meanings. It could be an interjection.
