= Sarab, Sarayan =

Village in South Khorasan province, Iran

Sarab Persian: سراب
- Village
- Location within Iran
- Coordinates: 33°58′19″N 58°33′48″E
- Country: Iran
- Province: South Khorasan
- County: Sarayan
- District: Aysak
- Rural District: Aysak

Population (2016)
  - Total: 93
- Time zone: UTC+3:30 (IRST)

Sarab (Persian: سراب) (Note: Also romanized as Sarāb) is a village in Aysak Rural District of Aysak District (Note: Known before 2008 as the Central District of Sarayan County) in Sarayan County, South Khorasan province, Iran.

== Demographics ==
=== Population ===
At the time of the 2006 National Census, the village's population was 134 in 38 households. The following census in 2011 counted 98 people in 35 households. The 2016 census measured the population of the village as 93 people in 41 households.
