= Charmeh =

Charmeh or Churmeh (Persian: چرمه) may refer to:

- Charmeh, North Khorasan
- Charmeh, South Khorasan
