= Darreh Par =

Village in South Khorasan province, Iran

Darreh Par Persian: دره پر
- Village
- Location within Iran
- Coordinates: 34°02′07″N 58°28′27″E
- Country: Iran
- Province: South Khorasan
- County: Sarayan
- District: Aysak
- Rural District: Masabi

Population (2016)
  - Total: 50
- Time zone: UTC+3:30 (IRST)

Darreh Par (Persian: دره پر) (Note: Also known as Darreh Bar) is a village in Masabi Rural District of Aysak District (Note: Known before 2008 as the Central District of Sarayan County) in Sarayan County, South Khorasan province, Iran.

== Demographics ==
=== Population ===
At the time of the 2006 National Census, the village's population was 54 in 22 households. The following census in 2011 counted 29 people in 14 households. The 2016 census measured the population of the village as 50 people in 22 households.
