= Dustabad, South Khorasan =

Village in South Khorasan province, Iran

Dustabad Persian: دوست اباد
- Village
- Location within Iran
- Coordinates: 33°40′45″N 58°41′05″E
- Country: Iran
- Province: South Khorasan
- County: Sarayan
- District: Seh Qaleh
- Rural District: Seh Qaleh

Population (2016)
  - Total: 1,690
- Time zone: UTC+3:30 (IRST)

Dustabad (Persian: دوست اباد) (Note: Also romanized as Dūstābād; also known as Dastābād) is a village in Seh Qaleh Rural District of Seh Qaleh District in Sarayan County, South Khorasan province, Iran.

== Demographics ==
=== Population ===
At the time of the 2006 National Census, the village's population was 1,627 in 356 households. The following census in 2011 counted 1,767 people in 462 households. The 2016 census measured the population of the village as 1,690 people in 494 households, the most populous in its rural district.
