= Tighdar =

Village in South Khorasan province, Iran

Tighdar Persian: تيغدر
- Village
- Location within Iran
- Coordinates: 33°33′53″N 58°57′11″E
- Country: Iran
- Province: South Khorasan
- County: Qaen
- District: Sedeh
- Rural District: Paskuh

Population (2016)
  - Total: 1,539
- Time zone: UTC+3:30 (IRST)

Tighdar (Persian: تيغدر) (Note: Also romanized as Tīghdar; also known as Tīqdār) is a village in Paskuh Rural District of Sedeh District in Qaen County, South Khorasan province, Iran.

== Demographics ==
=== Population ===
At the time of the 2006 National Census, the village's population was 981 in 274 households. The following census in 2011 counted 1,165 people in 351 households. The 2016 census measured the population of the village as 1,539 people in 471 households.
