= Abbasabad-e Dasht =

Village in South Khorasan province, Iran

Abbasabad-e Dasht Persian: عباس اباددشت
- Village
- Location within Iran
- Coordinates: 33°21′07″N 59°20′07″E
- Country: Iran
- Province: South Khorasan
- County: Qaen
- District: Sedeh
- Rural District: Sedeh

Population (2016)
  - Total: 332
- Time zone: UTC+3:30 (IRST)

Abbasabad-e Dasht (Persian: عباس اباددشت) (Note: Also romanized as ‘Abbāsābād-e Dasht; also known as Dasht) is a village in Sedeh Rural District of Sedeh District in Qaen County, South Khorasan province, Iran.

== Demographics ==
=== Population ===
At the time of the 2006 National Census, the village's population was 358 in 107 households. The following census in 2011 counted 356 people in 110 households. The 2016 census measured the population of the village as 332 people in 108 households.
