= Kerch, South Khorasan =

Village in South Khorasan province, Iran

Kerch Persian: كرچ
- Village
- Location within Iran
- Coordinates: 33°37′56″N 58°54′04″E
- Country: Iran
- Province: South Khorasan
- County: Qaen
- District: Sedeh
- Rural District: Paskuh

Population (2016)
  - Total: 260
- Time zone: UTC+3:30 (IRST)

Kerch (Persian: كرچ) (Note: Also romanized as Kerech; also known as Kerich) is a village in Paskuh Rural District of Sedeh District in Qaen County, South Khorasan province, Iran.

== Demographics ==
=== Population ===
At the time of the 2006 National Census, the village's population was 252 in 66 households. The following census in 2011 counted 231 people in 78 households. The 2016 census measured the population of the village as 260 people in 90 households.
