= Qumenjan =

Village in South Khorasan province, Iran

Qumenjan Persian: قومنجان
- Village
- Location within Iran
- Coordinates: 33°33′14″N 58°52′32″E
- Country: Iran
- Province: South Khorasan
- County: Qaen
- District: Sedeh
- Rural District: Paskuh

Population (2016)
  - Total: 1,468
- Time zone: UTC+3:30 (IRST)

Qumenjan (Persian: قومنجان) (Note: Also romanized as Qoumenjan and Qūmenjān; also known as Kūminju, Qomenjān (قمنجان), and Qomīnjān) is a village in, and the capital of, Paskuh Rural District in Sedeh District of Qaen County, South Khorasan province, Iran.

== Demographics ==
=== Population ===
At the time of the 2006 National Census, the village's population was 835 in 204 households. The following census in 2011 counted 1,263 people in 297 households. The 2016 census measured the population of the village as 1,468 people in 372 households.
