= Afriz =

Village in South Khorasan province, Iran

Afriz Persian: افريز
- Village
- Location within Iran
- Coordinates: 33°27′27″N 59°00′14″E
- Country: Iran
- Province: South Khorasan
- County: Qaen
- District: Sedeh
- Rural District: Afriz

Population (2016)
  - Total: 1,633
- Time zone: UTC+3:30 (IRST)

Afriz (Persian: افريز) (Note: Also romanized as Āfrīz) is a village in, and the capital of, Afriz Rural District in Sedeh District of Qaen County, South Khorasan province, Iran.

== Demographics ==
=== Population ===
At the time of the 2006 National Census, the village's population was 888 in 260 households. The following census in 2011 counted 1,536 people in 399 households. The 2016 census measured the population of the village as 1,633 people in 457 households, the most populous in its rural district.
