= Masabi =

Village in South Khorasan province, Iran

Masabi Persian: مصعبي
- Village
- Location within Iran
- Coordinates: 34°01′03″N 58°29′00″E
- Country: Iran
- Province: South Khorasan
- County: Sarayan
- District: Aysak
- Rural District: Masabi

Population (2016)
  - Total: 576
- Time zone: UTC+3:30 (IRST)

Masabi (Persian: مصعبي) (Note: Also romanized as Maş‘abī, Ma‘şabī, and Moş‘abī; also known as Mosāvī and Musavi) is a village in, and the capital of, Masabi Rural District in Aysak District (Note: Known before 2008 as the Central District of Sarayan County) of Sarayan County, South Khorasan province, Iran.

== Demographics ==
=== Population ===
At the time of the 2006 National Census, the village's population was 821 in 274 households. The following census in 2011 counted 639 people in 243 households. The 2016 census measured the population of the village as 576 people in 224 households.
