= Chahak, South Khorasan =

Village in South Khorasan province, Iran

Chahak Persian: چاهك
- Village
- Location within Iran
- Coordinates: 33°16′57″N 58°54′52″E
- Country: Iran
- Province: South Khorasan
- County: Qaen
- District: Sedeh
- Rural District: Afriz

Population (2016)
  - Total: 1,461
- Time zone: UTC+3:30 (IRST)

Chahak (Persian: چاهك) (Note: Also romanized as Chāhak) is a village in Afriz Rural District of Sedeh District in Qaen County, South Khorasan province, Iran.

== Demographics ==
=== Population ===
At the time of the 2006 National Census, the village's population was 1,068 in 274 households. The following census in 2011 counted 971 people in 309 households. The 2016 census measured the population of the village as 1,461 people in 425 households.
