= Chardeh =

Chardeh may refer to:

- Dibaj, a city in Semnan Province, Iran
- Chadeh, a village in South Khorasan Province, Iran
