= Tegha =

Tegha may refer to:

- Tighab, a village in South Khorasan, Iran
- A type of talwar, an Indian sword
