= Bar Kuk =

Village in South Khorasan province, Iran

Bar Kuk Persian: برکوک
- Village
- Location within Iran
- Coordinates: 33°25′20″N 59°22′42″E
- Country: Iran
- Province: South Khorasan
- County: Qaen
- District: Sedeh
- Rural District: Sedeh

Population (2016)
  - Total: 515
- Time zone: UTC+3:30 (IRST)

Bar Kuk (Persian: برکوک) (Note: Also romanized as Bar Kūk) is a village in Sedeh Rural District of Sedeh District in Qaen County, South Khorasan province, Iran.

== Demographics ==
=== Population ===
At the time of the 2006 National Census, the village's population was 575 in 180 households. The following census in 2011 counted 569 people in 184 households. The 2016 census measured the population of the village as 515 people in 188 households.
