= Nig, Iran =

Village in South Khorasan province, Iran

Nig Persian: نيگ
- Village
- Location within Iran
- Coordinates: 33°32′34″N 59°05′43″E
- Country: Iran
- Province: South Khorasan
- County: Qaen
- District: Sedeh
- Rural District: Afriz

Population (2016)
  - Total: 576
- Time zone: UTC+3:30 (IRST)

Nig (Persian: نيگ) (Note: Also romanized as Nīg; also known as Naik, Neyk, and Nīk) is a village in Afriz Rural District of Sedeh District in Qaen County, South Khorasan province, Iran.

== Demographics ==
=== Population ===
At the time of the 2006 National Census, the village's population was 595 in 150 households. The following census in 2011 counted 635 people in 182 households. The 2016 census measured the population of the village as 576 people in 179 households.
