= Jafarabad, Sedeh =

Village in South Khorasan province, Iran

Jafarabad Persian: جعفراباد
- Village
- Location within Iran
- Coordinates: 33°17′50″N 59°17′00″E
- Country: Iran
- Province: South Khorasan
- County: Qaen
- District: Sedeh
- Rural District: Sedeh

Population (2016)
  - Total: 137
- Time zone: UTC+3:30 (IRST)

Jafarabad (Persian: جعفراباد) (Note: Also romanized as Ja‘farābād) is a village in Sedeh Rural District of Sedeh District in Qaen County, South Khorasan province, Iran.

== Demographics ==
=== Population ===
At the time of the 2006 National Census, the village's population was 162 in 52 households. The following census in 2011 counted 139 people in 50 households. The 2016 census measured the population of the village as 137 people in 58 households.
