= Rum, Iran =

Village in South Khorasan province, Iran

Rum Persian: روم
- Village
- Location within Iran
- Coordinates: 33°26′51″N 59°11′19″E
- Country: Iran
- Province: South Khorasan
- County: Qaen
- District: Sedeh
- Rural District: Sedeh

Population (2016)
  - Total: 567
- Time zone: UTC+3:30 (IRST)

Rum (Persian: روم) (Note: Also romanized as Rūm; also known as Rom) is a village in Sedeh Rural District of Sedeh District in Qaen County, South Khorasan province, Iran.

== Demographics ==
=== Population ===
At the time of the 2006 National Census, the village's population was 607 in 218 households. The following census in 2011 counted 523 people in 214 households. The 2016 census measured the population of the village as 567 people in 221 households, the most populous in its rural district.
