= Chadeh =

Chadeh چاده
- Village
- Location within Iran
- Coordinates: 33°31′07″N 59°06′12″E
- Country: Iran
- Province: South Khorasan
- County: Qaen
- Bakhsh: Sedeh
- Rural District: Afriz

Population (2006)
  - Total: 96
- Time zone: UTC+3:30 (IRST)
  - Summer (DST): UTC+4:30 (IRDT)

Chadeh (Persian: چاده, also Romanized as Chādeh; also known as Chahār Deh and Chārdeh) is a village in Afriz Rural District, Sedeh District, Qaen County, South Khorasan Province, Iran. At the 2006 census, its population was 96, in 22 families.
