= Musaviyeh, Qaen =

Village in South Khorasan province, Iran

Musaviyeh Persian: موسويه
- Village
- Location within Iran
- Coordinates: 33°17′51″N 58°54′30″E
- Country: Iran
- Province: South Khorasan
- County: Qaen
- District: Sedeh
- Rural District: Afriz

Population (2016)
  - Total: 1,448
- Time zone: UTC+3:30 (IRST)

Musaviyeh (Persian: موسويه) (Note: Also romanized as Mūsavīyeh) is a village in Afriz Rural District of Sedeh District in Qaen County, South Khorasan province, Iran.

== Demographics ==
=== Population ===
At the time of the 2006 National Census, the village's population was 1,177 in 296 households. The following census in 2011 counted 1,244 people in 343 households. The 2016 census measured the population of the village as 1,448 people in 448 households.
