= Do Hesaran =

Village in South Khorasan province, Iran

Do Hesaran Persian: دوحصاران
- Village
- Location within Iran
- Coordinates: 33°47′40″N 58°19′21″E
- Country: Iran
- Province: South Khorasan
- County: Sarayan
- District: Aysak
- Rural District: Aysak

Population (2016)
  - Total: 963
- Time zone: UTC+3:30 (IRST)

Do Hesaran (Persian: دوحصاران) (Note: Also romanized as Do Heşārān, Dohesaran, and Doḩeşārān; also known as Deh Sarūn and Sarun) is a village in Aysak Rural District of Aysak District (Note: Known before 2008 as the Central District of Sarayan County) in Sarayan County, South Khorasan province, Iran.

== Demographics ==
=== Population ===
At the time of the 2006 National Census, the village's population was 872 in 241 households. The following census in 2011 counted 890 people in 274 households. The 2016 census measured the population of the village as 963 people in 293 households.
