= Shahrak-e Hashemiyeh =

Village in South Khorasan province, Iran

Shahrak-e Hashemiyeh Persian: شهرك هاشميه
- Village
- Location within Iran
- Coordinates: 33°38′27″N 58°48′45″E
- Country: Iran
- Province: South Khorasan
- County: Qaen
- District: Sedeh
- Rural District: Paskuh

Population (2016)
  - Total: 1,605
- Time zone: UTC+3:30 (IRST)

Shahrak-e Hashemiyeh (Persian: شهرك هاشميه) (Note: Also romanized as Shahrak-e Hāshemīyeh; also known as Hāshemīyeh) is a village in Paskuh Rural District of Sedeh District in Qaen County, South Khorasan province, Iran.

== Demographics ==
=== Population ===
At the time of the 2006 National Census, the village's population was 1,211 in 259 households. The following census in 2011 counted 1,299 people in 303 households. The 2016 census measured the population of the village as 1,605 people in 452 households.
