= Qeysar, Qaen =

Village in South Khorasan province, Iran

Qeysar Persian: قيصار
- Village
- Location within Iran
- Coordinates: 33°17′28″N 59°08′20″E
- Country: Iran
- Province: South Khorasan
- County: Qaen
- District: Sedeh
- Rural District: Sedeh

Population (2016)
  - Total: 171
- Time zone: UTC+3:30 (IRST)

Qeysar (Persian: قيصار) (Note: Also romanized as Qeyşār; also known as Qaisar) is a village in Sedeh Rural District of Sedeh District in Qaen County, South Khorasan province, Iran.

== Demographics ==
=== Population ===
At the time of the 2006 National Census, the village's population was 111 in 31 households. The following census in 2011 counted 105 people in 34 households. The 2016 census measured the population of the village as 171 people in 43 households.
