= Musawi =

Musawi may refer to:

- Abbas al-Musawi (c. 1952 – 1992), influential Muslim cleric and leader of Hezbollah
- Abd al-Husayn Sharaf al-Din al-Musawi, Shi'a twelver Islamic scholar
- Husayn Al-Musawi (also Hussein Musawi), a Lebanese Shia who founded the now-dissolved pro-Iranian Islamist militia Islamic Amal in 1982
- Mousavi is a surname
- Moosavi is a patronymic, common among Shi'a Muslims
- Mosavi, Iran, a village in Iran
