= Aliabad-e Musaviyeh =

Village in South Khorasan province, Iran

Aliabad-e Musaviyeh Persian: علي ابادموسويه
- Village
- Location within Iran
- Coordinates: 33°17′53″N 58°53′13″E
- Country: Iran
- Province: South Khorasan
- County: Qaen
- District: Sedeh
- Rural District: Afriz

Population (2016)
  - Total: 315
- Time zone: UTC+3:30 (IRST)

Aliabad-e Musaviyeh (Persian: علي ابادموسويه) (Note: Also romanized as Aliabad Musaviyeh, ‘Alīābād Mūsavīyeh, and ‘Alīābād-e Mūsavīyeh; also known as ‘Alīābād) is a village in Afriz Rural District of Sedeh District in Qaen County, South Khorasan province, Iran.

== Demographics ==
=== Population ===
At the time of the 2006 National Census, the village's population was 277 in 71 households. The following census in 2011 counted 280 people in 75 households. The 2016 census measured the population of the village as 315 people in 107 households.
