= Assam earthquake =

Assam earthquake may refer to:

- 1897 Assam earthquake
- 1947 Assam earthquake
- 1950 Assam–Tibet earthquake
- 2021 Assam earthquake
