= Bostaq =

Village in South Khorasan province, Iran

Bostaq Persian: بسطاق
- Village
- Location within Iran
- Coordinates: 33°45′12″N 58°32′23″E
- Country: Iran
- Province: South Khorasan
- County: Sarayan
- District: Seh Qaleh
- Rural District: Seh Qaleh

Population (2016)
  - Total: 852
- Time zone: UTC+3:30 (IRST)

Bostaq (Persian: بسطاق) (Note: Also romanized as Basţāq and Bosţāq; also known as Bustāq) is a village in Seh Qaleh Rural District of Seh Qaleh District in Sarayan County, South Khorasan province, Iran.

== Demographics ==
=== Population ===
At the time of the 2006 National Census, the village's population was 1,136 in 236 households. The following census in 2011 counted 790 people in 228 households. The 2016 census measured the population of the village as 852 people in 263 households.
