= Mohammadabad-e Chahak =

Village in South Khorasan province, Iran

Mohammadabad-e Chahak Persian: محمدابادچاهك
- Village
- Location within Iran
- Coordinates: 33°31′59″N 58°46′59″E
- Country: Iran
- Province: South Khorasan
- County: Qaen
- District: Sedeh
- Rural District: Paskuh

Population (2016)
  - Total: 712
- Time zone: UTC+3:30 (IRST)

Mohammadabad-e Chahak (Persian: محمدابادچاهك) (Note: Also romanized as Moḩammadābād-e Chāhaḵ; also known as Moḩammadābād and Muhammadābād) is a village in Paskuh Rural District of Sedeh District in Qaen County, South Khorasan province, Iran.

== Demographics ==
=== Population ===
At the time of the 2006 National Census, the village's population was 519 in 131 households. The following census in 2011 counted 622 people in 171 households. The 2016 census measured the population of the village as 712 people in 213 households.
