= Rumoshtik =

Village in South Khorasan province, Iran

Rumoshtik Persian: رومشتيك
- Village
- Location within Iran
- Coordinates: 33°34′48″N 59°00′39″E
- Country: Iran
- Province: South Khorasan
- County: Qaen
- District: Sedeh
- Rural District: Paskuh

Population (2016)
  - Total: 300
- Time zone: UTC+3:30 (IRST)

Rumoshtik (Persian: رومشتيك) (Note: Also romanized as Rūmashtīk and Rūmoshtīk; also known as Rumashti and Rūmoshnītak) is a village in Paskuh Rural District of Sedeh District in Qaen County, South Khorasan province, Iran.

== Demographics ==
=== Population ===
At the time of the 2006 National Census, the village's population was 300 in 71 households. The following census in 2011 counted 285 people in 85 households. The 2016 census measured the population of the village as 300 people in 93 households.
