= Esmailabad, Qaen =

Village in South Khorasan province, Iran

Esmailabad Persian: اسماعيل اباد
- Village
- Location within Iran
- Coordinates: 33°26′48″N 58°58′16″E
- Country: Iran
- Province: South Khorasan
- County: Qaen
- District: Sedeh
- Rural District: Afriz

Population (2016)
  - Total: 311
- Time zone: UTC+3:30 (IRST)

Esmailabad (Persian: اسماعيل اباد) (Note: Also romanized as Esmā‘īlābād and Ismāilābād) is a village in Afriz Rural District of Sedeh District in Qaen County, South Khorasan province, Iran.

== Demographics ==
=== Population ===
At the time of the 2006 National Census, the village's population was 269 in 67 households. The following census in 2011 counted 288 people in 77 households. The 2016 census measured the population of the village as 311 people in 85 households.
