= Chalunak =

Village in South Khorasan province, Iran

Chalunak Persian: چلونك
- Village
- Location within Iran
- Coordinates: 33°12′03″N 58°54′51″E
- Country: Iran
- Province: South Khorasan
- County: Qaen
- District: Sedeh
- Rural District: Afriz

Population (2016)
  - Total: 433
- Time zone: UTC+3:30 (IRST)

Chalunak (Persian: چلونك) (Note: Also romanized as Chalūnak; also known as Chilūnak) is a village in Afriz Rural District of Sedeh District in Qaen County, South Khorasan province, Iran.

== Demographics ==
=== Population ===
At the time of the 2006 National Census, the village's population was 383 in 98 households. The following census in 2011 counted 306 people in 90 households. The 2016 census measured the population of the village as 433 people in 133 households.
