= Khoshk (disambiguation) =

Khoshk is a village in South Khorasan Province, Iran.

Khoshk (Persian: خشك) may also refer to:

- Khoshk-e Bijar, Gilan Province
- Khoshk, Rasht, Gilan Province
- Khoshk Rudbar, Mazandaran Province
- Khoshk-e Sara, Mazandaran Province
