= Owj =

Owj اويج
- Village
- Location within Iran
- Coordinates: 33°22′11″N 59°13′03″E
- Country: Iran
- Province: South Khorasan
- County: Qaen
- Bakhsh: Sedeh
- Rural District: Afriz

Population (2006)
  - Total: 345
- Time zone: UTC+3:30 (IRST)
  - Summer (DST): UTC+4:30 (IRDT)

Owj (Persian: اويج, also Romanized as Auj) is a village in Afriz Rural District, Sedeh District, Qaen County, South Khorasan Province, Iran. At the 2006 census, its population was 345, in 82 families.
