= Sarun =

Sarun may refer to:

- Sarun, Iran (disambiguation), villages in Iran
- Chan Sarun (born 1951), Cambodian politician
- Sarun Promkaew (born 1982), Thai footballer
- Sarun Van (born 1949), Cambodian swimmer
