= List of earthquakes in 1947 =

Earthquakes in 1947
Approximate epicenters of the earthquakes in 1947
- 4.0–5.9 magnitude
- 6.0–6.9 magnitude
- 7.0–7.9 magnitude
- 8.0+ magnitude
- Strongest: 2 events reached magnitude 7.6
- Deadliest: Iran, South Khorasan Province (Magnitude 6.9) September 23 500 deaths
- Total fatalities: 745

Number by magnitude
- 9.0+: 0

This is a list of earthquakes in 1947. Only magnitude 6.0 or greater earthquakes appear on the list. Lower magnitude events are included if they have caused death, injury or damage. Events which occurred in remote areas will be excluded from the list as they wouldn't have generated significant media interest. All dates are listed according to UTC time. Although a fairly busy year in terms of magnitude 7.0+ events, the death toll was relatively low at 745. Up to 733 deaths were attributed to two events in Iran and Peru. The largest events measured 7.6 which compared with recent years was quite modest. Magnitude 7.0+ earthquakes were generally spread around the world with Indonesia seeing the most.

== Overall ==
=== By death toll ===
Rank	Death toll	Magnitude	Location	MMI	Depth (km)	Date
1	500	6.9	Iran, South Khorasan Province	VIII (Severe)	15.0	September 23
2	233	7.6	Peru, Junin Region	X (Extreme)	20.0	November 1

- Note: At least 10 casualties

=== By magnitude ===
Rank	Magnitude	Death toll	Location	MMI	Depth (km)	Date
= 1	7.6	0	Indonesia, off the north coast of Papua (province)	VI (Strong)	15.0	May 27
= 1	7.6	233	Peru, Junin Region	X (Extreme)	20.0	November 1
2	7.4	0	Taiwan, northeast of	( )	121.5	September 26
= 3	7.3	0	Republic of China (1912-1949), Qinghai Province	VII (Very strong)	15.0	March 17
= 3	7.3	0	Indonesia, off the north coast of Papua (province)	VII (Very strong)	15.0	April 2
= 3	7.3	0	India, Arunachal Pradesh	VII (Very strong)	20.0	July 29
= 3	7.3	3	Greece, Peloponnese (region)	VII (Very strong)	15.0	October 6
= 4	7.2	0	Nicaragua, eastern Managua	( )	162.5	January 26
= 4	7.2	0	Argentina, Santiago del Estero Province	( )	565.8	January 29
= 4	7.2	0	United States, Northern Mariana Islands	( )	35.0	June 19
= 4	7.2	0	United States, central Alaska	VIII (Severe)	26.0	October 16
= 5	7.0	0	New Zealand, Hawke's Bay Region	VI (Strong)	165.0	March 25
= 5	7.0	0	Philippines, Leyte	VII (Very strong)	15.0	June 7
= 5	7.0	0	Indonesia, Molucca Sea	VI (Strong)	15.0	June 12
= 5	7.0	0	United States, Northern Mariana Islands	( )	35.0	June 13
= 5	7.0	0	Japan, eastern Sea of Japan	V (Moderate)	15.0	November 4
= 5	7.0	0	Southeast Indian Ridge	( )	60.0	December 24

- Note: At least 7.0 magnitude

== Notable events ==
=== January ===
January
- Strongest: 7.2 M_{w} 2 events
- Total fatalities: 0

Number by magnitude
- 8.0–8.9: 0
- 7.0–7.9: 2
- 6.0–6.9: 2

Date	Country and location	M_{w}	Depth (km)	MMI	Notes	Casualties	
Date	Country and location	M_{w}	Depth (km)	MMI	Notes	Dead	Injured
3	Soviet Union, east of Kuril Islands, Russia	6.5	15.0				
21	Chile, Antofagasta Region	6.8	35.2				
26	Nicaragua, eastern Managua	7.2	162.5		Some damage was caused.		
29	Argentina, Santiago del Estero Province	7.2	565.8				

=== February ===
February
- Strongest: 6.8 M_{w} Japan
- Total fatalities: 0

Number by magnitude
- 8.0–8.9: 0
- 7.0–7.9: 0
- 6.0–6.9: 4

Date	Country and location	M_{w}	Depth (km)	MMI	Notes	Casualties	
Date	Country and location	M_{w}	Depth (km)	MMI	Notes	Dead	Injured
2	New Hebrides, Vanuatu	6.5	130.0				
7	United Kingdom, Solomon Islands	6.3	15.0	VII			
10	Tibet, Tibet	6.5	15.0	VII			
18	Japan, off the south coast of Honshu	6.8	429.0				

=== March ===
March
- Strongest: 7.3 M_{w} Republic of China (1912-1949)
- Deadliest: 5.5 M_{w} Republic of China (1912-1949); 1 death
- Total fatalities: 1

Number by magnitude
- 8.0–8.9: 0
- 7.0–7.9: 2
- 6.0–6.9: 1
- 5.0–5.9: 1

Date	Country and location	M_{w}	Depth (km)	MMI	Notes	Casualties	
Date	Country and location	M_{w}	Depth (km)	MMI	Notes	Dead	Injured
2	Australia, Madang Province, New Guinea	6.6	35.0	VII			
17	Republic of China (1912-1949), Qinghai Province	7.3	15.0	VII			
25	New Zealand, Hawke's Bay Region	7.0	165.0	VI	Some damage was caused. A small tsunami was reported.		
26	Republic of China (1912-1949), Yunnan Province	5.5	0.0	VII	1 person was killed and at least 1 was injured. Many homes were destroyed.	1	1+

=== April ===
April
- Strongest: 7.3 M_{w} Indonesia
- Total fatalities: 0

Number by magnitude
- 8.0–8.9: 0
- 7.0–7.9: 1
- 6.0–6.9: 2

Date	Country and location	M_{w}	Depth (km)	MMI	Notes	Casualties	
Date	Country and location	M_{w}	Depth (km)	MMI	Notes	Dead	Injured
2	Indonesia, off the north coast of Papua (province)	7.3	15.0	VII			
10	United States, Mojave Desert, California	6.5	6.0	VIII	Surface ruptures were observed which was significant for the area. Some minor damage was caused.		
14	Soviet Union, east of the Kuril Islands, Russia	6.9	30.0				

=== May ===
May
- Strongest: 7.6 M_{w} Indonesia
- Total fatalities: 0

Number by magnitude
- 8.0–8.9: 0
- 7.0–7.9: 1
- 6.0–6.9: 2

Date	Country and location	M_{w}	Depth (km)	MMI	Notes	Casualties	
Date	Country and location	M_{w}	Depth (km)	MMI	Notes	Dead	Injured
6	Australia, southwest of New Britain, Papua New Guinea	6.8	35.0	VI			
27	Indonesia, Alor Archipelago	6.5	100.0				
27	Indonesia, off the north coast of Papua (province)	7.6	15.0	VI			

=== June ===
June
- Strongest: 7.2 M_{w} United States
- Deadliest: 5.5 M_{w} Republic of China (1912-1949); 3 deaths
- Total fatalities: 3

Number by magnitude
- 8.0–8.9: 0
- 7.0–7.9: 4
- 6.0–6.9: 1
- 5.0–5.9: 1

Date	Country and location	M_{w}	Depth (km)	MMI	Notes	Casualties	
Date	Country and location	M_{w}	Depth (km)	MMI	Notes	Dead	Injured
4	Greece, Central Macedonia	6.0	80.0				
7	Republic of China (1912-1949), Sichuan Province	5.5	0.0	VII	3 people were killed and some homes collapsed.	3	
7	Philippines, Leyte	7.0	15.0	VII			
12	Indonesia, Molucca Sea	7.0	15.0	VI			
13	United States, Northern Mariana Islands	7.0	35.0	rowspan="2"| Doublet earthquake.			
19	United States, Northern Mariana Islands	7.2	35.0				

=== July ===
July
- Strongest: 7.3 M_{w} India
- Deadliest: 0.0 M_{w} Colombia; 2 deaths
- Total fatalities: 2

Number by magnitude
- 8.0–8.9: 0
- 7.0–7.9: 1
- 6.0–6.9: 3

Date	Country and location	M_{w}	Depth (km)	MMI	Notes	Casualties	
Date	Country and location	M_{w}	Depth (km)	MMI	Notes	Dead	Injured
10	India, Himachal Pradesh	6.0	60.0				
14	Colombia, Narino Department	0.0	10.0	IX	2 people were killed and some damage was reported. Magnitude unknown.	2	
25	Argentina, Salta Province	6.2	580.0				
26	Soviet Union, Kuril Islands, Russia	6.5	80.0				
29	India, Arunachal Pradesh	7.3	20.0	VII	1947 Assam earthquake.		

=== August ===
August
- Strongest: 6.8 M_{w} 2 events
- Deadliest: 5.3 M_{w} France; 3 deaths
- Total fatalities: 3

Number by magnitude
- 8.0–8.9: 0
- 7.0–7.9: 0
- 6.0–6.9: 3
- 5.0–5.9: 1

Date	Country and location	M_{w}	Depth (km)	MMI	Notes	Casualties	
Date	Country and location	M_{w}	Depth (km)	MMI	Notes	Dead	Injured
5	India, off the coast of Pakistan	6.8	15.0	VII			
6	Brazil, Acre (state)	6.8	603.3				
6	France, off the coast of Algeria	5.3	0.0	IX	3 people were killed and at least 101 were injured. Some damage was reported. Depth unknown.	3	101+
7	Cuba, southeast of	6.6	35.0	VI			

=== September ===
September
- Strongest: 7.4 M_{w} Taiwan
- Deadliest: 6.9 M_{w} Iran; 500 deaths
- Total fatalities: 500

Number by magnitude
- 8.0–8.9: 0
- 7.0–7.9: 1
- 6.0–6.9: 3

Date	Country and location	M_{w}	Depth (km)	MMI	Notes	Casualties	
Date	Country and location	M_{w}	Depth (km)	MMI	Notes	Dead	Injured
2	Tonga	6.8	230.0				
3	Soviet Union, Kuril Islands, Russia	6.8	110.0				
23	Iran, South Khorasan Province	6.9	15.0	VIII	1947 Dustabad earthquake: 500 people were killed and major damage was caused.	500	
26	Taiwan, northeast of	7.4	121.5				

=== October ===
October
- Strongest: 7.3 M_{w} Greece
- Deadliest: 7.3 M_{w} Greece; 3 deaths
- Total fatalities: 3

Number by magnitude
- 8.0–8.9: 0
- 7.0–7.9: 2
- 6.0–6.9: 1

Date	Country and location	M_{w}	Depth (km)	MMI	Notes	Casualties	
Date	Country and location	M_{w}	Depth (km)	MMI	Notes	Dead	Injured
3	Iran, Kerman Province	6.2	35.0				
6	Greece, Peloponnese (region)	7.3	15.0	IX	3 people were killed and 20 were injured. 7,000 homes were destroyed.	3	20
16	United States, central Alaska	7.2	26.0	VIII	Some damage was caused in the area.		

=== November ===
November
- Strongest: 7.6 M_{w} Peru
- Deadliest: 7.6 M_{w} Peru; 233 deaths
- Total fatalities: 233

Number by magnitude
- 8.0–8.9: 0
- 7.0–7.9: 2
- 6.0–6.9: 3

Date	Country and location	M_{w}	Depth (km)	MMI	Notes	Casualties	
Date	Country and location	M_{w}	Depth (km)	MMI	Notes	Dead	Injured
1	Peru, Junin Region	7.6	20.0	X	233 people were killed and major damage was caused by the 1947 Satipo earthquake	233	
4	Japan, eastern Sea of Japan	7.0	15.0	V	A tsunami generated some damage on the coast of Hokkaido.		
9	France, southeast of the Loyalty Islands, New Caledonia	6.6	15.0				
14	Japan, northern Hokkaido	6.7	160.0				
23	United States, western Montana	6.1	5.0	VIII			

=== December ===
December
- Strongest: 7.0 M_{w} Southeast Indian Ridge
- Total fatalities: 0

Number by magnitude
- 8.0–8.9: 0
- 7.0–7.9: 1
- 6.0–6.9: 0

Date	Country and location	M_{w}	Depth (km)	MMI	Notes	Casualties	
Date	Country and location	M_{w}	Depth (km)	MMI	Notes	Dead	Injured
24	Southeast Indian Ridge	7.0	60.0				
