= Gurab-e Jadid =

Village in South Khorasan province, Iran

Gurab-e Jadid Persian: گوراب جديد
- Village
- Location within Iran
- Coordinates: 33°37′39″N 58°50′29″E
- Country: Iran
- Province: South Khorasan
- County: Qaen
- District: Sedeh
- Rural District: Paskuh

Population (2016)
  - Total: 243
- Time zone: UTC+3:30 (IRST)

Gurab-e Jadid (Persian: گوراب جديد) (Note: Also romanized as Gūrāb-e Jadīd; also known as Gūrāb) is a village in Paskuh Rural District of Sedeh District in Qaen County, South Khorasan province, Iran.

== Demographics ==
=== Population ===
At the time of the 2006 National Census, the village's population was 183 in 43 households. The following census in 2011 counted 189 people in 51 households. The 2016 census measured the population of the village as 243 people in 71 households.
