= Paskuh Rural District (Qaen County) =

Rural district in South Khorasan province, Iran

Paskuh Rural District Persian: دهستان پسكوه
- Rural District
- Location within Iran
- Coordinates: 33°33′N 58°52′E
- Country: Iran
- Province: South Khorasan
- County: Qaen
- District: Sedeh
- Established: 1986
- Capital: Qumenjan

Population (2016)
  - Total: 8,441
- Time zone: UTC+3:30 (IRST)

Paskuh Rural District (Persian: دهستان پسكوه) is in Sedeh District of Qaen County, South Khorasan province, Iran. Its capital is the village of Qumenjan.

== Demographics ==
=== Population ===
At the time of the 2006 National Census, the rural district's population was 6,407 in 1,592 households. There were 7,357 inhabitants in 2,019 households at the following census of 2011. The 2016 census measured the population of the rural district as 8,441 in 2,470 households. The most populous of its 18 villages was Tighab, with 1,962 people.

=== Other villages in the rural district ===
- Gurab-e Jadid
- Kerch
- Mohammadabad-e Chahak
- Rumoshtik
- Shahrak-e Hashemiyeh
- Tighdar
