= Dokuheh Rural District =

Rural district in South Khorasan province, Iran

Dokuheh Rural District Persian: دهستان دوكوهه
- Rural District
- Location within Iran
- Coordinates: 33°20′N 58°19′E
- Country: Iran
- Province: South Khorasan
- County: Sarayan
- District: Seh Qaleh
- Established: 2005
- Capital: Chah Talab

Population (2016)
  - Total: 631
- Time zone: UTC+3:30 (IRST)

Dokuheh Rural District (Persian: دهستان دوكوهه) is in Seh Qaleh District of Sarayan County, South Khorasan province, Iran. Its capital is the village of Chah Talab.

== Demographics ==
=== Population ===
At the time of the 2006 National Census, the rural district's population was 2,412 in 562 households. There were 843 inhabitants in 226 households at the following census of 2011. The 2016 census measured the population of the rural district as 631 in 170 households. The most populous of its 49 villages was Chah Ghiyas, with 321 people.

=== Other villages in the rural district ===
- Band-e Now-e Do
- Chah Paniri
- Chah Terikhi
- Cheshmeh-ye Sarmandali
- Gushmir
- Howz-e Galurshur
- Howz-e Hafez
- Istu Chah
- Jahanabad
- Ravij
- Torsh Ap
- Zari Chah
