= Aysak =

City in South Khorasan province, Iran

Aysak Persian: آيسك
- City
- Location within Iran
- Coordinates: 33°53′12″N 58°22′53″E
- Country: Iran
- Province: South Khorasan
- County: Sarayan
- District: Aysak
- Established as a city: 1999

Population (2016)
  - Total: 5,143
- Time zone: UTC+3:30 (IRST)

Aysak (Persian: آيسك) (Note: Also romanized as Āysak; also known as Aiāz and Ayāz) is a city in, and the capital of, Aysak District (Note: Known before 2008 as the Central District of Sarayan County) in Sarayan County, South Khorasan province, Iran. It also serves as the administrative center for Aysak Rural District. The village of Aysak was converted to a city in 1999.

== Demographics ==
=== Population ===
At the time of the 2006 National Census, the city's population was 5,023 in 1,399 households. The following census in 2011 counted 4,756 people in 1,488 households. The 2016 census measured the population of the city as 5,143 people in 1,639 households.
