= Charmeh, South Khorasan =

Village in South Khorasan province, Iran

Charmeh Persian: چرمه
- Village
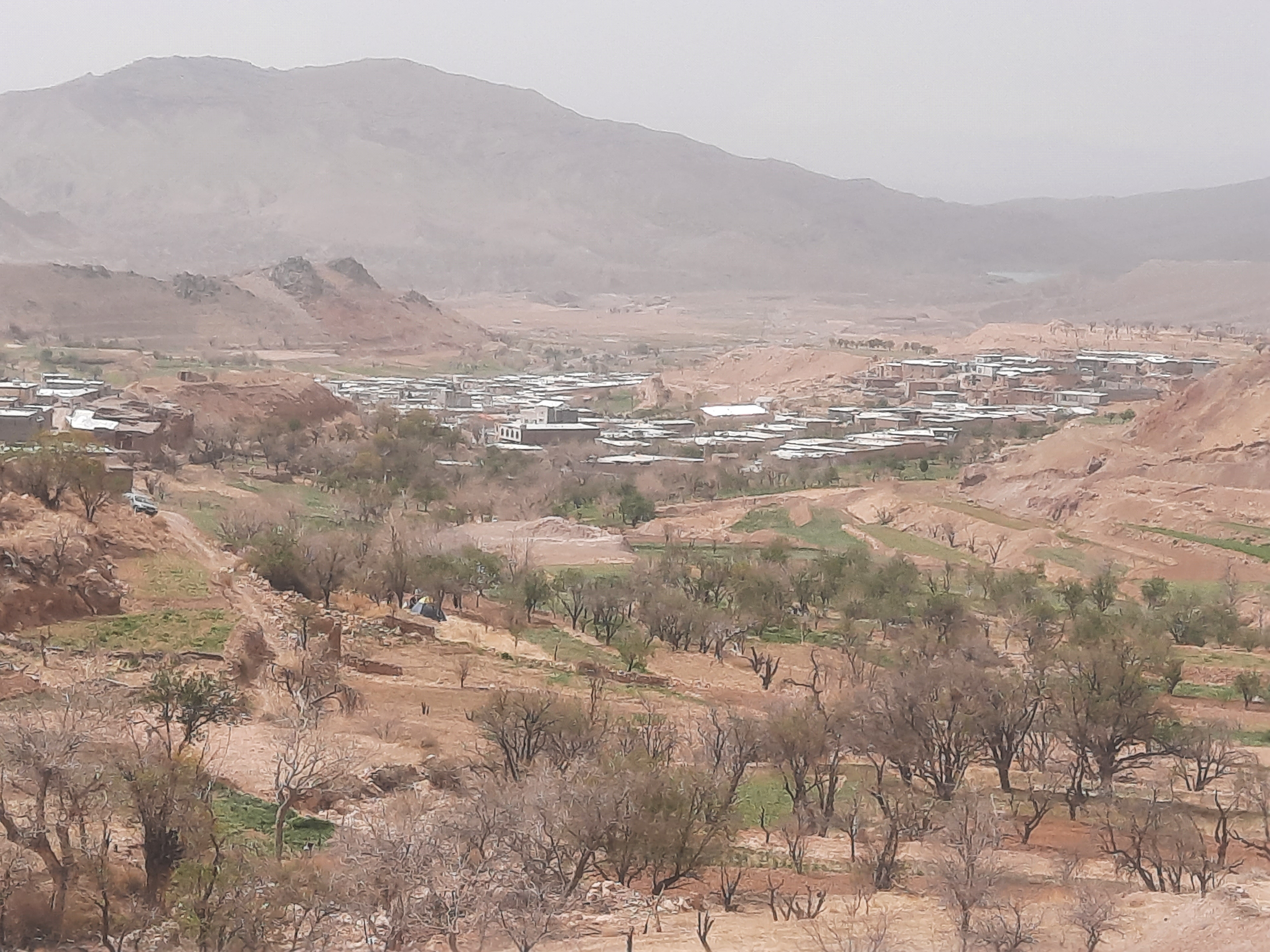
- The village of Charmeh

- Location within Iran
- Coordinates: 33°56′32″N 58°35′12″E
- Country: Iran
- Province: South Khorasan
- County: Sarayan
- District: Aysak
- Rural District: Aysak

Population (2016)
  - Total: 757
- Time zone: UTC+3:30 (IRST)

Charmeh (Persian: چرمه) is a village in Aysak Rural District of Aysak District (Note: Known before 2008 as the Central District of Sarayan County) in Sarayan County, South Khorasan province, Iran.

== Demographics ==
=== Population ===
At the time of the 2006 National Census, the village's population was 1,209 in 351 households. The following census in 2011 counted 835 people in 287 households. The 2016 census measured the population of the village as 757 people in 291 households.

== Economy ==
The economy of this village is based on the cultivation of saffron, pomegranate, and jujube.

== Tourist attractions ==
- Batoon Cave
- Charmeh Garden
- Plane tree of Charmeh
- Tomb of Pir Abazar

== Gallery ==
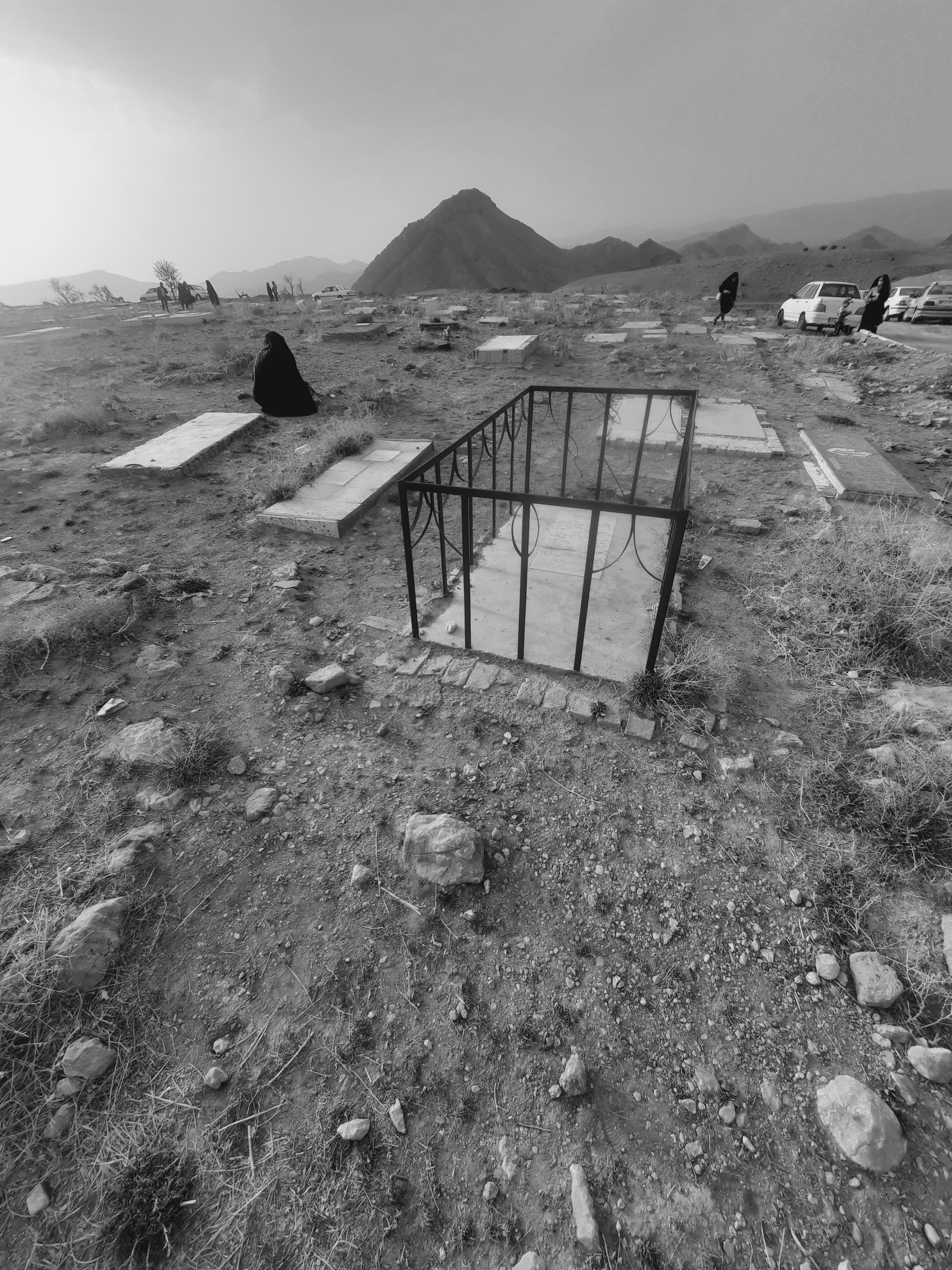
Cemetery of Charmeh

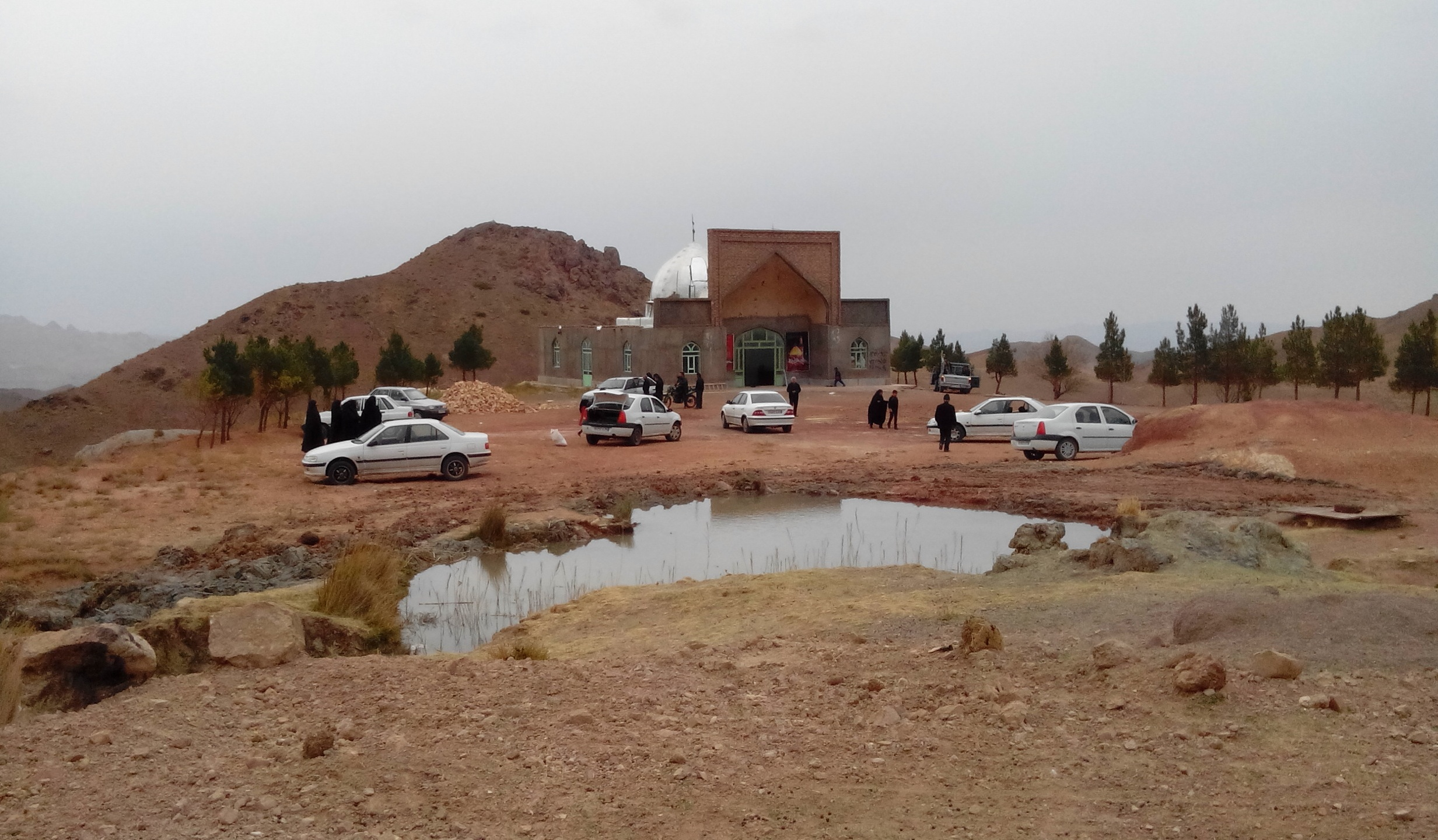
Pir Abazar Tomb

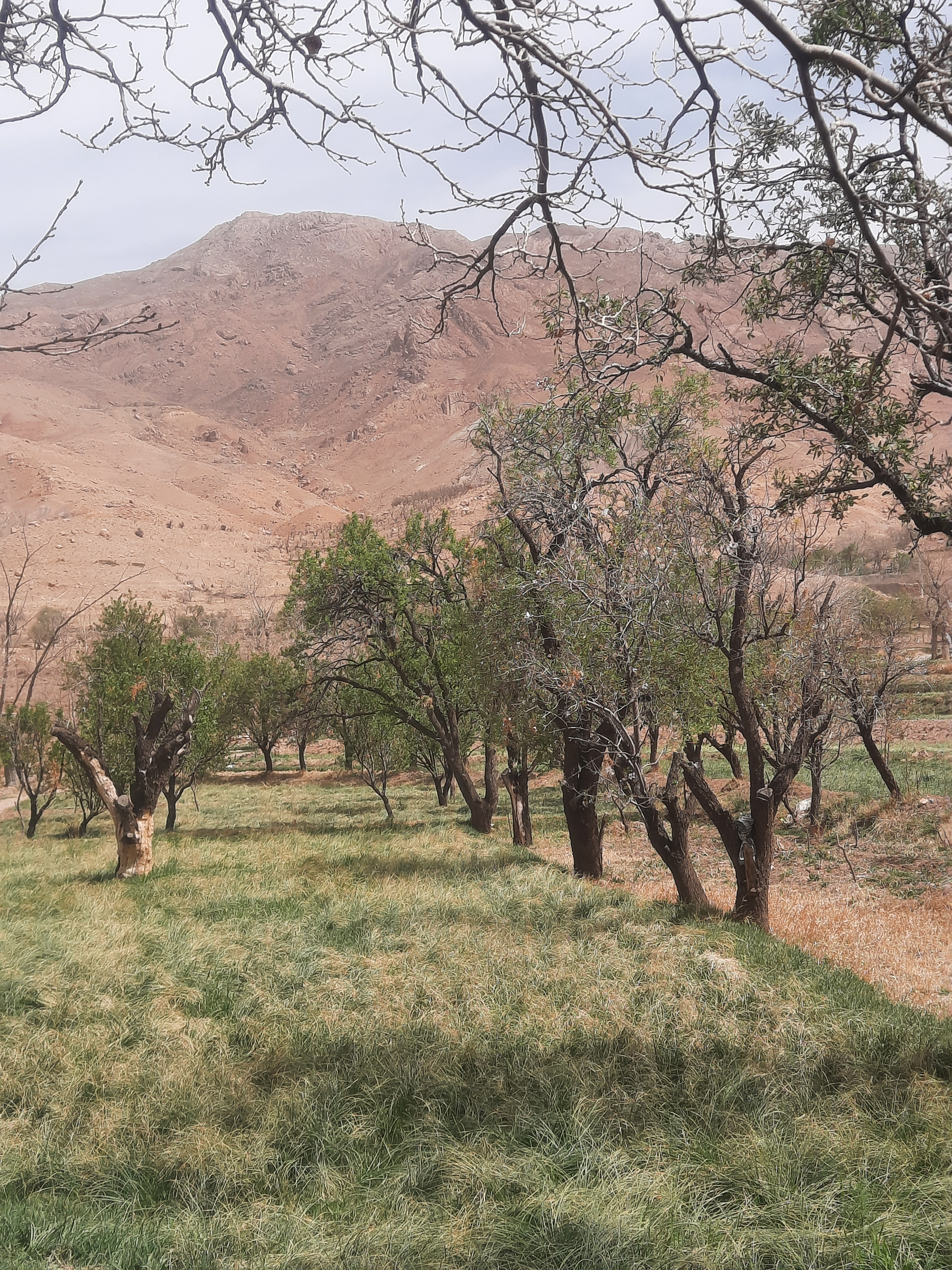
Garden in Charmeh
