= Jolgeh Sedeh =

Village in South Khorasan province, Iran

Jolgeh Sedeh Persian: جلگه سده
- Village
- Location within Iran
- Coordinates: 33°17′57″N 59°11′20″E
- Country: Iran
- Province: South Khorasan
- County: Qaen
- District: Sedeh
- Rural District: Sedeh

Population (2016)
  - Total: 211
- Time zone: UTC+3:30 (IRST)

Jolgeh Sedeh (Persian: جلگه سده) (Note: Also known as Jolgeh) is a village in Sedeh Rural District of Sedeh District in Qaen County, South Khorasan province, Iran.

== Demographics ==
=== Population ===
At the time of the 2006 National Census, the village's population was 239 in 70 households. The following census in 2011 counted 226 people in 75 households. The 2016 census measured the population of the village as 211 people in 71 households.
