= Arianshahr =

City in South Khorasan province, Iran

Arianshahr Persian: آرين شهر
- City
- Location within Iran
- Coordinates: 33°19′55″N 59°14′02″E
- Country: Iran
- Province: South Khorasan
- County: Qaen
- District: Sedeh
- Established as a city: 2004

Population (2016)
  - Total: 3,729
- Time zone: UTC+3:30 (IRST)

Arianshahr (Persian: آرين شهر) (Note: Formerly the village of Sedeh (سده), also romanized as Seh Deh and Sehdeh) is a city in and the capital of Sedeh District in Qaen County, South Khorasan province, Iran. It also serves as the administrative center of Sedeh Rural District. The village of Sedeh was converted to a city and renamed Arianshahr in 2004.

== Demographics ==
=== Population ===
At the time of the 2006 National Census, the city's population was 3,051, residing in 834 households. The following census in 2011 recorded 3,585 people in 1,038 households. The 2016 census recorded a population 3,729 people in 1,090 households.
