= Sarun, Iran =

Sarun, Iran may refer to:

- Sarand, Ferdows
- Do Hesaran
