= Seh Qaleh =

City in South Khorasan province, Iran

Seh Qaleh Persian: سه قلعه
- City
- Location within Iran
- Coordinates: 33°40′03″N 58°23′50″E
- Country: Iran
- Province: South Khorasan
- County: Sarayan
- District: Seh Qaleh
- Established as a city: 2002

Population (2016)
  - Total: 4,436
- Time zone: UTC+3:30 (IRST)

Seh Qaleh (Persian: سه قلعه) (Note: Also romanized as Seh Qal‘eh; also known as Seh Kaleh) is a city in, and the capital of, Seh Qaleh District in Sarayan County, South Khorasan province, Iran. It also serves as the administrative center for Seh Qaleh Rural District. The village of Seh Qaleh was converted to a city in 2002.

== Demographics ==
=== Population ===
At the time of the 2006 National Census, the city's population was 5,036 in 1,225 households. The following census in 2011 counted 4,242 people in 1,155 households. The 2016 census measured the population of the city as 4,436 people in 1,290 households.
