= Aysak Rural District =

Rural district in South Khorasan province, Iran

Aysak Rural District Persian: دهستان آیسک
- Rural District
- Location within Iran
- Coordinates: 33°51′N 58°24′E
- Country: Iran
- Province: South Khorasan
- County: Sarayan
- District: Aysak
- Established: 1987
- Capital: Aysak

Population (2016)
  - Total: 4,261
- Time zone: UTC+3:30 (IRST)

Aysak Rural District (Persian: دهستان آیسک) is in Aysak District (Note: Known before 2008 as the Central District of Sarayan County) of Sarayan County, South Khorasan province, Iran. It is administered from the city of Aysak.

== Demographics ==
=== Population ===
At the time of the 2006 National Census, the rural district's population was 4,736 in 1,292 households. There were 4,166 inhabitants in 1,301 households at the following census of 2011. The 2016 census measured the population of the rural district as 4,261 in 1,374 households. The most populous of its 161 villages was Baghdadeh, with 1,808 people.

=== Other villages in the rural district ===
- Amrui
- Aspur
- Aviz
- Azdak
- Bani Khanik
- Charmeh
- Cheshmeh-ye Seyyed
- Do Hesaran
- Hojjatabad
- Sarab
