= 1947 Satipo earthquake =

Earthquake in Peru

- Location within Peru
- UTC time: 1947-11-01 14:58:57
- ISC event: 898103
- USGS-ANSS: ComCat
- Local date: November 1, 1947
- Local time: 09:58:57
- Magnitude: 7.6–7.7 M_{w}
- Depth: 22 km (14 mi)
- Epicenter: 10.973°S 74.725°W
- Areas affected: Peru
- Max. intensity: MMI IX (Violent)
- Landslides: Yes
- Casualties: 233–2,233 dead

The 1947 Satipo earthquake was the largest earthquake in the sub-Andean region of Peru. It occurred on November 1 at 09:58:57 local time with an epicenter in the Department of Junín. The earthquake had an estimated moment magnitude (M_{w}) of 7.6–7.7 and focal depth of 22 km (14 mi). It was caused by dip-slip movement on a shallow-angle fault. The earthquake caused severe damage to the towns of Satipo and La Merced, and was felt several hundred kilometers away in Iquitos and Lima. It also triggered widespread landslides in the region. Landslides along the Satipo River caused it to flood, leaving thousands homeless and possibly drowning people along the river's course. The total death toll from the earthquake was between 233 and 2,233.

== Tectonic setting ==
Earthquakes in Peru are mainly concentrated at the subduction zone where the Nazca Plate subducts beneath the South American Plate at the Peru–Chile Trench off its west coast. Another zone of seismic activity occurs within the South American Plate in the Andes region. In the high Andes, shallow earthquakes are the result of normal-faulting such as the 1946 Ancash earthquake which ruptured a shallow-dipping fault oriented parallel to the range. The western margin of the Cordillera Blanca in central Peru exhibits normal-faulting and coincides with extensional tectonics acting perpendicular to the range.

While normal-faulting is the dominant mechanism, parts of the western sub-Andes experience thrust tectonics. This zone is located between the high Andes and Amazonian craton and is characterised by active fold and thrusting since the Pliocene. The occurrence of northwest-trending, west-dipping thrust faults in the belt suggest the Amazonian craton is being thrusted beneath the Cordillera Oriental. A possible cause of these earthquakes is intraplate deformation in response to subduction of the Nazca Plate. Most thrust earthquakes in the region occur on steep-angled fault planes ranging from 30 to 60° at depths of 10 to 38 km (6.2 to 23.6 mi), corresponding to the lower crust and upper mantle.

== Earthquake ==
The main shock occurred on 1 November at 14:58:57 UTC (09:58:57 local time) with an epicenter about 136 km (85 mi) north–northeast of Huancayo, the capital of Department of Junín. It was a shallow intraplate earthquake that occurred within the South American Plate, having a focal depth of 22 km (14 mi), and was the largest of its kind ever recorded in the sub-Andean region. The United States Geological Survey measured the earthquake at 7.5 on the surface-wave magnitude scale and 7.6–7.7 by the International Seismological Centre on the moment magnitude scale.

The aftershocks that followed had epicenters distributed east of the main shock. An analysis of data from seismic stations in Weston, Pasadena and Saint-Maur indicated that the main shock was caused by vertical movement on a north-oriented fault plane that dipped 30°. The inferred dip angle was shallower than that of faults surveyed in the region. Within the epicenter region, two other earthquakes larger than magnitude 6.0 were recorded. In 1976, a M_{s} 6.6 strike-slip earthquake occurred south of the 1947 earthquake epicenter at 5 km (3.1 mi) depth, and a M_{w} 6.5–6.8 shock in 1982 occurred north of the 1947 earthquake with a left-lateral–reverse mechanism.

== Impact ==
The earthquake was felt across a 1,300,000 km^{2} (500,000 sq mi) area encompassing nearly all of Peru. It was also felt across a large portion of Brazil from Tabatinga to the headwaters of the Acre River. A maximum Modified Mercalli intensity of VIII–IX (Severe–Violent) was assigned to a 4,000 km (2,500 mi) area. Intensity IX (Violent) was observed in an area immediately southeast of the epicenter. The peak ground acceleration was calculated at 309 mm (12.2 in) per second-squared in Satipo, based on evaluating a collapsed brick pillar. Hundreds of kilometers away in Iquitos and Lima, the shaking corresponding to III–IV (Weak–Light). In the latter city, those attending church scrambled outdoors. According to the United States Geological Survey, 233 people were killed. However, deaths were only recorded in several towns such as Satipo, Andamarca, Acobamba, La Merced, Víctor, Comas, Perené and other towns, and the toll was not finalized. El Comercio reported a higher figure of 2,233. In the town of Satipo alone, at least 40 people died and many were missing, and in Huancayo, 3 people died when a church tower collapsed.

The earthquake destroyed or seriously damaged 63 percent of all adobe constructed homes in La Merced. Another 36 percent of homes had slight damage, while the remaining 1 percent were undamaged. The town hotel was one of those buildings that remained undamaged. Most reinforced concrete homes withstood the earthquake shaking, although some sustained cracked, but at least half of all limestone buildings were destroyed. In Satipo, the earthquake collapsed an entire school complex, and an uncompleted church with thick brick walls and reinforced iron beams was razed. Many new buildings of similar construction were also demolished. In the towns of Jauja and Cerro de Pasco, many adobe buildings were severely damaged. The settlements of Andamarca, Acobamba and Comas also experienced significant damage.

Landslides were extensive in the elevated forest region. These landslides were then deposited into ravines between San Ramón and Satipo, forming landslide dams. One of these landslide dams was breached and caused a flood that inundated Puerto Ocopa. Many small-scale landslides destroyed the forested areas around the Satipo River and parts of a highway were buried under landslide debris. An unknown number of people may have drowned when the Satipo River flooded while thousands were homeless.

In the aftermath some injured victims were airlifted to Lima. The Minister of Agriculture, Pedro Venturo Zapata, visited the affected area and led in the recovery efforts. The Red Cross also flew in supplies to assist those affected by the earthquake and floods.

== See also ==
- List of earthquakes in 1947
- List of earthquakes in Peru
