= Masabi Rural District =

Rural district in South Khorasan province, Iran

Masabi Rural District Persian: دهستان مصعبي
- Rural District
- Location within Iran
- Coordinates: 34°01′N 58°29′E
- Country: Iran
- Province: South Khorasan
- County: Sarayan
- District: Aysak
- Established: 1987
- Capital: Masabi

Population (2016)
  - Total: 1,682
- Time zone: UTC+3:30 (IRST)

Masabi Rural District (Persian: دهستان مصعبي) is in Aysak District (Note: Known before 2008 as the Central District of Sarayan County) of Sarayan County, South Khorasan province, Iran. Its capital is the village of Masabi.

== Demographics ==
=== Population ===
At the time of the 2006 National Census, the rural district's population was 2,445 in 852 households. There were 1,865 inhabitants in 749 households at the following census of 2011. The 2016 census measured the population of the rural district as 1,682 in 706 households. The most populous of its 30 villages was Karimu, with 679 people.

=== Other villages in the rural district ===
- Aba Mansuri
- Darreh Par
- Khavar-e Pain
- Khurzad
- Naram
- Now Bahar
- Now Deh
