= Seh Qaleh Rural District =

Rural district in South Khorasan province, Iran

Seh Qaleh Rural District Persian: دهستان سه ‌قلعه
- Rural District
- Location within Iran
- Coordinates: 33°40′N 58°26′E
- Country: Iran
- Province: South Khorasan
- County: Sarayan
- District: Seh Qaleh
- Established: 1987
- Capital: Seh Qaleh

Population (2016)
  - Total: 3,364
- Time zone: UTC+3:30 (IRST)

Seh Qaleh Rural District (Persian: دهستان سه ‌قلعه) is in Seh Qaleh District of Sarayan County, South Khorasan province, Iran. It is administered from the city of Seh Qaleh.

== Demographics ==
=== Population ===
At the time of the 2006 National Census, the rural district's population was 3,886 in 877 households. There were 3,374 inhabitants in 950 households at the following census of 2011. The 2016 census measured the population of the rural district as 3,364 in 1,020 households. The most populous of its 71 villages was Dustabad, with 1,690 people.

=== Other villages in the rural district ===
- Bostaq
- Shahrak-e Shahid Dastghib
- Zanagu
