= Khoshk =

Village in South Khorasan province, Iran

Khoshk Persian: خشك
- Village
- Location within Iran
- Coordinates: 33°28′29″N 59°21′58″E
- Country: Iran
- Province: South Khorasan
- County: Qaen
- District: Sedeh
- Rural District: Sedeh

Population (2016)
  - Total: 511
- Time zone: UTC+3:30 (IRST)

Khoshk (Persian: خشك) (Note: Also known as Khoshg, Khsohk, and Khushk) is a village in Sedeh Rural District of Sedeh District in Qaen County, South Khorasan province, Iran.

== Demographics ==
=== Population ===
At the time of the 2006 National Census, the village's population was 737 in 305 households. The following census in 2011 counted 653 people in 292 households. The 2016 census measured the population of the village as 511 people in 242 households.
