= 1947 Assam earthquake =

Earthquake in India

- Location within India
- UTC time: 1947-07-29 13:43:24
- ISC event: 897970
- USGS-ANSS: ComCat
- Local date: July 29, 1947
- Local time: 18:43:24
- Magnitude: 7.3 M_{w}
- Depth: 60 km (37 mi)
- Epicenter: 28.50°N 94.00°E
- Max. intensity: EMS-98 V (Strong)

The 1947 Assam earthquake occurred on 29 July at 13:43 UTC with an M_{w} of 7.3 and a maximum EMS-98 intensity of V (Strong).

== Earthquake ==
The earthquake was located near the border between India and Tibet. Some sources put the epicenter in India, and some put it in Tibet. The released seismic moment was about 1.5×10^{20} Nm. The mechanism of the earthquake is not well known. In the Chinese literature, this earthquake was often located around the Nang County, Tibet.

== Damage ==
In Dibrugarh, Jorhat, and Tezpur, there were cracks in walls. Failure of electricity was reported in Guwahati.

== Other seismicity ==
The border region was struck by the much larger 8.6 M_{w} Assam–Tibet earthquake three years later, on August 15, 1950.

== See also ==
- List of earthquakes in 1947
- List of earthquakes in India
