= Jolgeh Rural District =

Jolgeh Rural District (Persian: دهستان جلگه) may refer to:

- Jolgeh Rural District (Hamadan Province)
- Jolgeh Rural District (Isfahan Province)
- Jolgeh Rural District (Razavi Khorasan Province)
- Jolgeh Rural District (Behabad County), Yazd province
