= Tighab =

Village in South Khorasan province, Iran

Tighab Persian: تيغاب
- Village
- Location within Iran
- Coordinates: 33°39′40″N 58°45′23″E
- Country: Iran
- Province: South Khorasan
- County: Qaen
- District: Sedeh
- Rural District: Paskuh

Population (2016)
  - Total: 1,962
- Time zone: UTC+3:30 (IRST)

Tighab (Persian: تيغاب) (Note: Also romanized as Tīghāb; also known as Tegha and Tūghāb)) is a village in Paskuh Rural District of Sedeh District in Qaen County, South Khorasan province, Iran.

== Demographics ==
=== Population ===
At the time of the 2006 National Census, the village's population was 1,614 in 412 households. The following census in 2011 counted 1,677 people in 496 households. The 2016 census measured the population of the village as 1,962 people in 598 households, the most populous in its rural district.
