= Austrojet =

Austrian charter airline

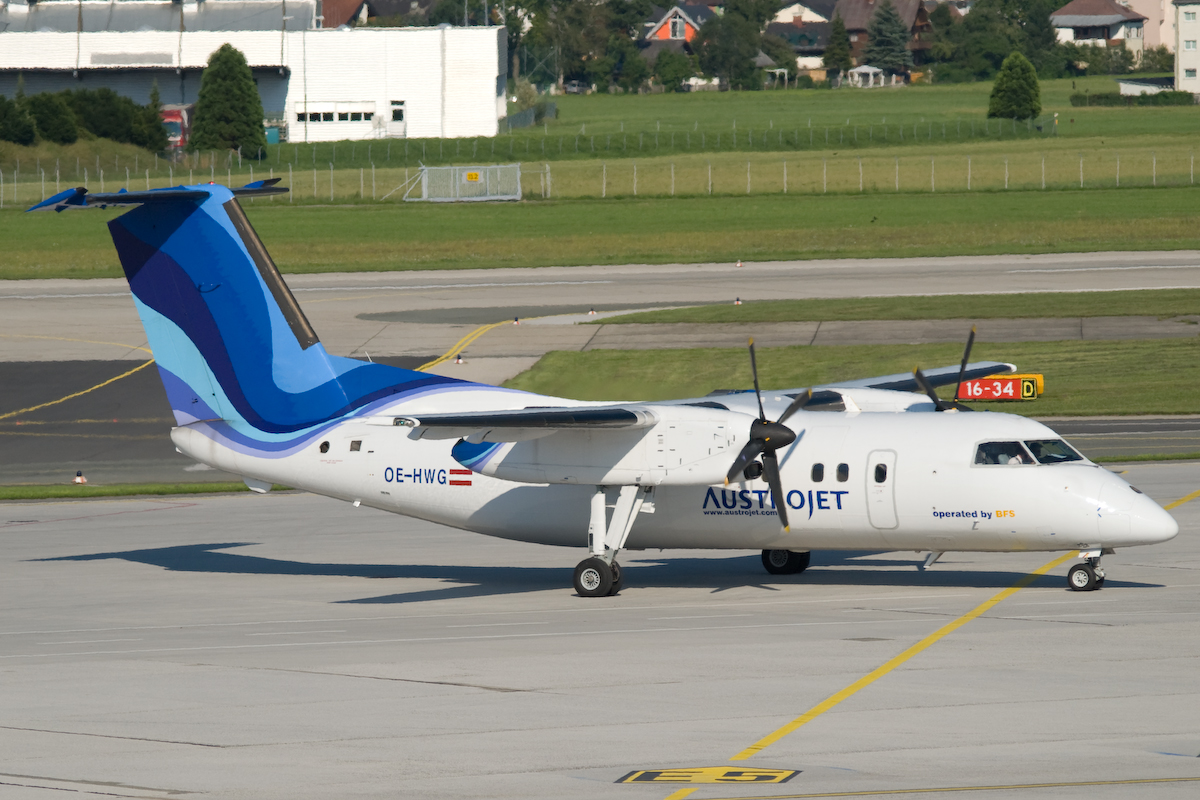
- Bombardier DHC 8
IATA	ICAO	Call sign
-	AUJ	AUSTROJET
- Founded: 2006
- Ceased operations: 2009
- Hubs: Salzburg Airport
- Fleet size: 4
- Headquarters: Salzburg, Austria
- Website: austrojetprivate.com

Austrojet was an Austrian charter airline operated by BFS (Business Flight Salzburg Bedarfsflug GesmbH). Flight operations were started in 2006. Two years later the airline launched scheduled services to boost the economy between western Austria and Bosnia and Herzegowina.

== Destinations ==
Since April 2008, Austrojet operated the Salzburg – Banja Luka route three times a week, with plans to fly to Tivat, Montenegro and Stuttgart, Germany later on. By January 2009, all references to scheduled service no longer appear in the Austrojet website.

== Fleet ==
The Austrojet fleet consisted of the following aircraft:

- 1 Bombardier DHC 8-100 (later leased to Olympic Air)
- 1 Citation 501
- 2 Citation 550
