= Sarayan =

City in South Khorasan province, Iran

Sarayan Persian: سرايان
- City
- Location within Iran
- Coordinates: 33°51′49″N 58°31′16″E
- Country: Iran
- Province: South Khorasan
- County: Sarayan
- District: Aysak

Population (2016)
  - Total: 13,795
- Time zone: UTC+3:30 (IRST)

Sarayan (Persian: سرايان) (Note: Also romanized as Sarā’īān and Sarāyān; also known as Sīryān) is a city in Aysak District (Note: Known before 2008 as the Central District of Sarayan County) of Sarayan County, South Khorasan province, Iran, serving as capital of the county.

== Demographics ==
=== Population ===
At the time of the 2006 National Census, the city's population was 11,098 in 2,933 households. The following census in 2011 counted 13,247 people in 3,627 households. The 2016 census measured the population of the city as 13,795 people in 4,130 households.
