= Sedeh Rural District (Qaen County) =

Rural district in South Khorasan province, Iran

Sedeh Rural District Persian: دهستان سده
- Rural District
- Location within Iran
- Coordinates: 33°24′N 59°17′E
- Country: Iran
- Province: South Khorasan
- County: Qaen
- District: Sedeh
- Established: 1986
- Capital: Arianshahr

Population (2016)
  - Total: 3,180
- Time zone: UTC+3:30 (IRST)

Sedeh Rural District (Persian: دهستان سده) is in Sedeh District of Qaen County, South Khorasan province, Iran. It is administered from the city of Arianshahr. (Note: Formerly the village of Sedeh)

== Demographics ==
=== Population ===
At the time of the 2006 National Census, the rural district's population was 3,569 in 1,250 households. There were 3,264 inhabitants in 1,228 households at the following census of 2011. The 2016 census measured the population of the rural district as 3,180 in 1,220 households. The most populous of its 36 villages was Rum, with 567 people.

=== Other villages in the rural district ===
- Abbasabad-e Dasht
- Bar Kuk
- Jafarabad
- Jolgeh Sedeh
- Khoshk
- Qeysar
