= Afriz Rural District =

Rural district in South Khorasan province, Iran

Afriz Rural District Persian: دهستان آفريز
- Rural District
- Location within Iran
- Coordinates: 33°23′N 58°58′E
- Country: Iran
- Province: South Khorasan
- County: Qaen
- District: Sedeh
- Established: 2002
- Capital: Afriz

Population (2016)
  - Total: 7,123
- Time zone: UTC+3:30 (IRST)

Afriz Rural District (Persian: دهستان آفريز) is in Sedeh District of Qaen County, South Khorasan province, Iran. Its capital is the village of Afriz.

== Demographics ==
=== Population ===
At the time of the 2006 National Census, the rural district's population was 5,765 in 1,479 households. There were 6,276 inhabitants in 1,749 households at the following census of 2011. The 2016 census measured the population of the rural district as 7,123 in 2,129 households. The most populous of its 15 villages was Afriz, with 1,633 people.

=== Other villages in the rural district ===
- Aliabad-e Musaviyeh
- Chahak
- Chalunak
- Esmailabad
- Musaviyeh
- Nig
