= Seh Qaleh District =

District in South Khorasan province, Iran

Seh Qaleh District Persian: بخش سه قلعه
- District
- Location within Iran
- Coordinates: 33°20′N 58°17′E
- Country: Iran
- Province: South Khorasan
- County: Sarayan
- Established: 2005
- Capital: Seh Qaleh

Population (2016)
  - Total: 8,431
- Time zone: UTC+3:30 (IRST)

Seh Qaleh District (Persian: بخش سه قلعه) is in Sarayan County, South Khorasan province, Iran. Its capital is the city of Seh Qaleh.

== Demographics ==
=== Population ===
At the time of the 2006 National Census, the district's population was 11,334 in 2,664 households. The following census in 2011 counted 8,459 people in 2,331 households. The 2016 census measured the population of the district as 8,431 inhabitants in 2,480 households.

=== Administrative divisions ===
Seh Qaleh District Population
Administrative Divisions	2006	2011	2016
Dokuheh RD	2,412	843	631
Seh Qaleh RD	3,886	3,374	3,364
Seh Qaleh (city)	5,036	4,242	4,436
Total	11,334	8,459	8,431
RD = Rural District
