= Aysak District =

District in South Khorasan province, Iran

Aysak District Persian: بخش آیسک
- District
- Location within Iran
- Coordinates: 33°54′N 58°24′E
- Country: Iran
- Province: South Khorasan
- County: Sarayan
- Established: 2005
- Capital: Aysak

Population (2016)
  - Total: 24,881
- Time zone: UTC+3:30 (IRST)

Aysak District (Persian: بخش آیسک) (Note: Known before 2008 as the Central District of Sarayan County (بخش مرکزی شهرستان سرایان)) is in Sarayan County, South Khorasan province, Iran. Its capital is the city of Aysak.

== Demographics ==
=== Population ===
At the time of the 2006 National Census, the district's population was 23,302 in 6,476 households. The following census in 2011 counted 24,034 people in 7,165 households. The 2016 census measured the population of the district as 24,881 inhabitants in 7,849 households.

=== Administrative divisions ===
Aysak District Population
Administrative Divisions	2006	2011	2016
Aysak RD	4,736	4,166	4,261
Masabi RD	2,445	1,865	1,682
Aysak (city)	5,023	4,756	5,143
Sarayan (city)	11,098	13,247	13,795
Total	23,302	24,034	24,881
RD = Rural District
