= Sedeh District (Qaen County) =

District in South Khorasan province, Iran

Sedeh District Persian: بخش سده
- District
- Location within Iran
- Coordinates: 33°27′N 59°03′E
- Country: Iran
- Province: South Khorasan
- County: Qaen
- Capital: Arianshahr

Population (2016)
  - Total: 22,473
- Time zone: UTC+3:30 (IRST)

Sedeh District (Persian: بخش سده) is in Qaen County, South Khorasan province, Iran. Its capital is the city of Arianshahr. (Note: Formerly the village of Sedeh)

== Demographics ==
=== Population ===
At the time of the 2006 National Census, the district's population was 18,792 in 5,155 households. The following census in 2011 counted 20,482 people in 6,034 households. The 2016 census measured the population of the district as 22,473 inhabitants in 6,909 households.

=== Administrative divisions ===
Sedeh District Population
Administrative Divisions	2006	2011	2016
Afriz RD	5,765	6,276	7,123
Paskuh RD	6,407	7,357	8,441
Sedeh RD	3,569	3,264	3,180
Arianshahr (city)	3,051	3,585	3,729
Total	18,792	20,482	22,473
RD = Rural District
