= Sarayan County =

County in South Khorasan province, Iran

Sarayan County Persian: شهرستان سرایان
- County
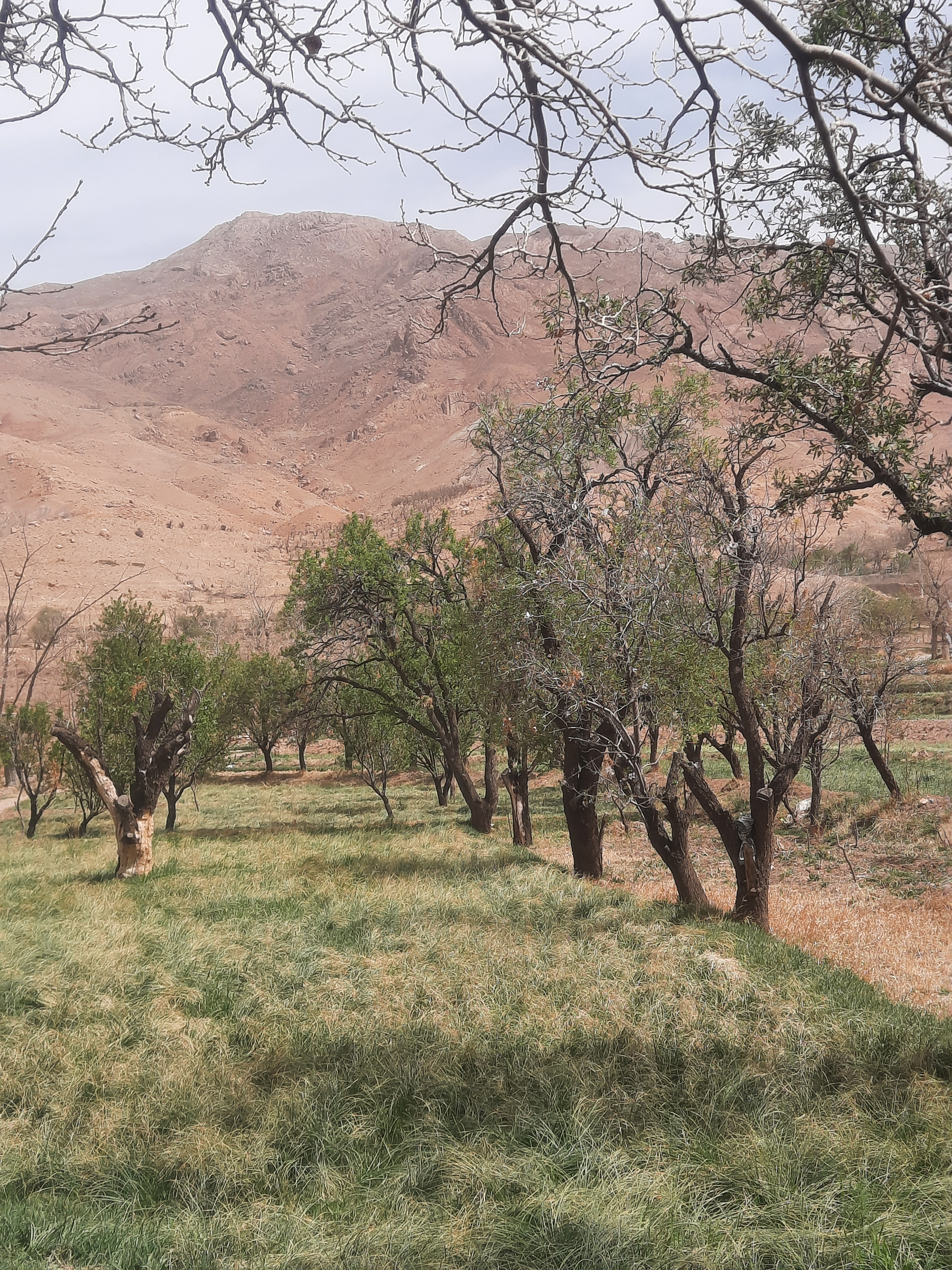
- Landscape in the village of Charmeh

- Location of Sarayan County in South Khorasan province (top center, green)

- Location of South Khorasan province in Iran
- Coordinates: 33°28′N 58°19′E
- Country: Iran
- Province: South Khorasan
- Established: 2005
- Capital: Sarayan
- Districts: Aysak, Seh Qaleh

Population (2016)
  - Total: 33,312
- Time zone: UTC+3:30 (IRST)

Sarayan County (Persian: شهرستان سرایان) is in South Khorasan province, Iran. Its capital is the city of Sarayan. Sarayan is in the north central part of the province. The county was a part of Ferdows County until May 2004.

== Demographics ==
=== Population ===
At the time of the 2006 National Census, the county's population was 34,636 in 9,140 households. The following census in 2011 counted 32,493 people in 9,466 households. The 2016 census measured the population of the county as 33,312 in 10,329 households.

=== Administrative divisions ===
Sarayan County's population history and administrative structure over three consecutive censuses are shown in the following table.

Sarayan County Population
Administrative Divisions	2006	2011	2016
Aysak District (Note: Known before 2008 as the Central District of Sarayan County)	23,302	24,034	24,881
Aysak RD	4,736	4,166	4,261
Masabi RD	2,445	1,865	1,682
Aysak (city)	5,023	4,756	5,143
Sarayan (city)	11,098	13,247	13,795
Seh Qaleh District	11,334	8,459	8,431
Dokuheh RD	2,412	843	631
Seh Qaleh RD	3,886	3,374	3,364
Seh Qaleh (city)	5,036	4,242	4,436
Total	34,636	32,493	33,312
RD = Rural District

== See also ==
Media related to Sarayan County at Wikimedia Commons
