= Mazdab =

Village in South Khorasan province, Iran

Mazdab Persian: مزداب
- Village
- Location within Iran
- Coordinates: 33°14′39″N 59°22′31″E
- Country: Iran
- Province: South Khorasan
- County: Birjand
- District: Central
- Rural District: Alqurat

Population (2016)
  - Total: 356
- Time zone: UTC+3:30 (IRST)

Mazdab (Persian: مزداب) (Note: Also romanized as Mazdāb) is a village in Alqurat Rural District of the Central District in Birjand County, South Khorasan province, Iran.

It is located on the northern part of Birjand, between Birjand and Qaen. The distance from Birjand is 75 km on the way passing from Arian Shahr and to Qaen is 70 km. It is bordered to the southeast by Asu, to the west by Khong, to the north by Mahmooi, to the northeast by Gazar.

== Demographics ==
=== Population ===
At the time of the 2006 National Census, the village's population was 548 in 180 households. The following census in 2011 counted 459 people in 172 households. The 2016 census measured the population of the village as 356 people in 144 households.

== Agriculture ==
Like most of the neighbor villages, the main agricultural product of Mazdab is Zereshk. It is exported mainly to Tehran and Mashhad. However, some other products like jujube, grape, pistachio, apricot, apple quince, pear, etc. are produced in a limited volume and just for internal usage in some parts of the village.

== Industry ==
The main industry from old times is hand made carpet. There are also some working places for Zereshk packing. Moreover, there is also an industrial place for poultry making.
