= Chahkand =

Chahkand or Chah Kand (Persian: چهكند) may refer to:

- Chahkand, Baqeran
- Chah Kand, Fasharud
- Chah Kand, alternate name for Chahkandak
- Chahkand, Sarbisheh
- Chahkand-e Gol
- Chahkand-e Mud

== See also ==
- Chahkanduk (disambiguation)
