= Chahardeh =

Chahardeh or Chahar Deh (Persian: چهارده) may refer to:

- Chahardeh, former name of Dibaj, a city in Semnan Province
- Chahar Deh, Chaharmahal and Bakhtiari
- Chahar Deh, Fars
- Chahar Deh, Gilan
- Chahar Deh, Golestan
- Chahar Deh, Khuzestan
- Chahar Deh-e Rudbar, Mazandaran Province
- Chahar Deh, Razavi Khorasan
- Chahar Deh, Mashhad, Razavi Khorasan Province
- Chahar Deh, Qaen, South Khorasan Province
- Chahar Deh, Tabas, South Khorasan Province
- Chahardeh-ye Bala, South Khorasan Province
- Chahardeh-ye Pain, South Khorasan Province
- Chahardeh Rural District, in Gilan Province
