= Ashtakhu =

Ashtakhu اشتاخو
- Village
- Location within Iran
- Coordinates: 32°54′55″N 59°35′27″E
- Country: Iran
- Province: South Khorasan
- County: Birjand
- Bakhsh: Central
- Rural District: Kahshang

Population (2016)
  - Total: 81
- Time zone: UTC+3:30 (IRST)
  - Summer (DST): UTC+4:30 (IRDT)

Ashtakhu (Persian: اشتاخو, also Romanized as Āshtākhū; also known as Eshtā Khān, Āshtākhūn, Eshtadkhūn, Eshtākhan, Eshtākhoon, Eshtākhūn, Eshtāqān, and Ishtākhūn) is a village in Kahshang Rural District, in the Central District of Birjand County, South Khorasan Province, Iran. At the 2016 census, its population was 81, in 28 families.
