= Golunak =

Golunak گلونك
- Village
- Location within Iran
- Coordinates: 33°12′33″N 59°04′04″E
- Country: Iran
- Province: South Khorasan
- County: Birjand
- Bakhsh: Central
- Rural District: Fasharud

Population (2006)
  - Total: 25
- Time zone: UTC+3:30 (IRST)
  - Summer (DST): UTC+4:30 (IRDT)

Golunak (Persian: گلونك, also Romanized as Golūnak and Gulūnak; also known as Golūnūk) is a village in Fasharud Rural District, in the Central District of Birjand County, South Khorasan Province, Iran. At the 2006 census, its population was 25, in 10 families.
