= Chahkanduk =

Chahkanduk (Persian: چهكندوك) may refer to:

- Chahkanduk, alternate name of Chahkandak
- Chahkanduk, Birjand
- Chahkanduk, Sarbisheh

== See also ==
- Chahkand (disambiguation)
