= Kur Gaz-e Bala =

Kur Gaz-e Bala كورگزبالا
- Village
- Location within Iran
- Coordinates: 33°01′35″N 59°15′08″E
- Country: Iran
- Province: South Khorasan
- County: Birjand
- Bakhsh: Central
- Rural District: Alqurat

Population (2006)
  - Total: 17
- Time zone: UTC+3:30 (IRST)
  - Summer (DST): UTC+4:30 (IRDT)

Kur Gaz-e Bala (Persian: كورگزبالا, also Romanized as Kūr Gaz-e Bālā; also known as Khuryās and Kūreh Gaz Bālā) is a village in Alqurat Rural District, in the Central District of Birjand County, South Khorasan Province, Iran. At the 2006 census, its population was 17, in 5 families.
