= Bushad =

Bushad بوشاد
- Village
- Location within Iran
- Coordinates: 32°46′49″N 59°20′46″E
- Country: Iran
- Province: South Khorasan
- County: Birjand
- Bakhsh: Central
- Rural District: Baqeran

Population (2006)
  - Total: 170
- Time zone: UTC+3:30 (IRST)
  - Summer (DST): UTC+4:30 (IRDT)

Bushad (Persian: بوشاد, also Romanized as Būshād, Baushād, Beshād, Booshad, and Bowshād) is a village in Baqeran Rural District, in the Central District of Birjand County, South Khorasan Province, Iran. At the 2006 census, its population was 170, in 52 families.
