= Mafand Ab =

Mafand Ab مافنداب
- Village
- Location within Iran
- Coordinates: 32°55′17″N 59°33′43″E
- Country: Iran
- Province: South Khorasan
- County: Birjand
- Bakhsh: Central
- Rural District: Kahshang

Population (2016)
  - Total: 34
- Time zone: UTC+3:30 (IRST)
  - Summer (DST): UTC+4:30 (IRDT)

Mafand Ab (Persian: مافنداب, also Romanized as Māfand Āb; also known as Māqandāb) is a village in Kahshang Rural District, in the Central District of Birjand County, South Khorasan Province, Iran. At the 2016 census, its population was 34, in 14 families.
