= Sad Gol =

Sad Gol صدگل
- Village
- Location within Iran
- Coordinates: 33°08′21″N 59°25′09″E
- Country: Iran
- Province: South Khorasan
- County: Birjand
- Bakhsh: Central
- Rural District: Alqurat

Population (2006)
  - Total: 81
- Time zone: UTC+3:30 (IRST)
  - Summer (DST): UTC+4:30 (IRDT)

Sad Gol (Persian: صدگل, also Romanized as Şad Gol, Sad Gul, and Şad Kol) is a village in Alqurat Rural District, in the Central District of Birjand County, South Khorasan Province, Iran. At the 2006 census, its population was 81, in 28 families.
