= Kalateh-ye Baba =

Kalateh-ye Baba كلاته بابا
- Village
- Location within Iran
- Coordinates: 32°49′40″N 59°14′42″E
- Country: Iran
- Province: South Khorasan
- County: Birjand
- Bakhsh: Central
- Rural District: Baqeran

Population (2006)
  - Total: 10
- Time zone: UTC+3:30 (IRST)
  - Summer (DST): UTC+4:30 (IRDT)

Kalateh-ye Baba (Persian: كلاته بابا, also Romanized as Kalāteh-ye Bābā; also known as Kalāteh-ye Bābā’ī) is a village in Baqeran Rural District, in the Central District of Birjand County, South Khorasan Province, Iran. In the 2006 census, its population was recorded as being 10 people, in 5 families.
