= Feriz =

Feriz or Fariz or Feris (Persian: فريز) may refer to:

- Feriz, Birjand, South Khorasan
- Feriz, Khusf, South Khorasan
- Feriz Morgh, South Khorasan
- Feriz Nuk, South Khorasan
- Feriz Beg, 15th/16th century Ottoman military officer, Sanjak-bey of the Sanjak of Scutari and Sanjak of Bosnia.
- Feriz, Bayramören
