= Khorashad =

Village in South Khorasan province, Iran

Khorashad Persian: خراشاد
- Village
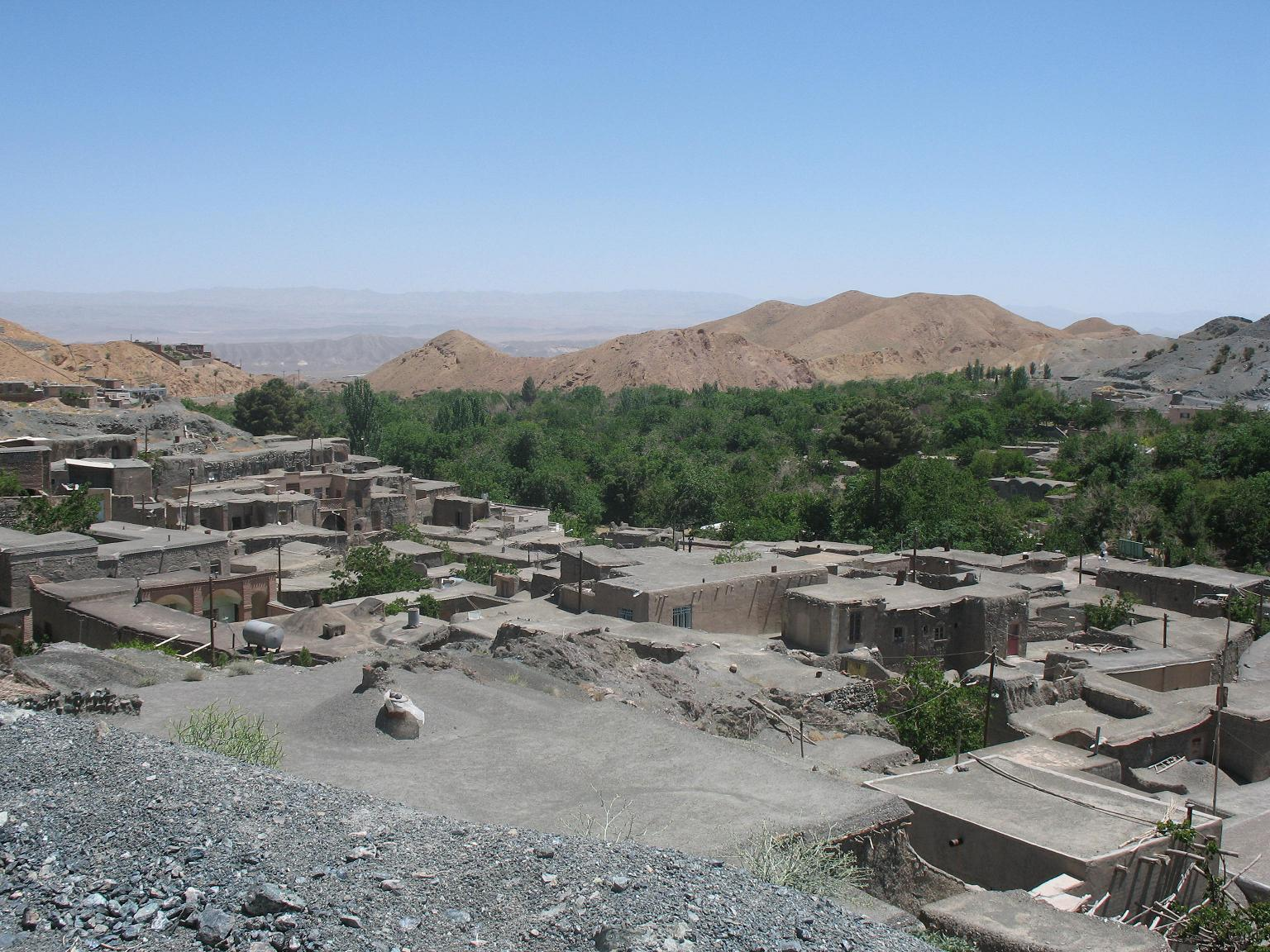
- Traditional architecture of the village of Khorashad

- Location within Iran
- Coordinates: 32°45′N 59°24′E
- Country: Iran
- Province: South Khorasan
- County: Birjand
- District: Central
- Rural District: Baqeran

Population (2016)
  - Total: 626
- Time zone: UTC+3:30 (IRST)
- Area code: +98561523
- Website: http://www.khorashad.com

Khorashad (Persian: خراشاد) (Note: Also romanized as Kharashad, Khorāshād, and Khorshād) is a village in Baqeran Rural District of the Central District in Birjand County, South Khorasan province, Iran. Khorashad is known for its beautiful environment, its notable people, and its handicrafts.

== Etymology ==
The historic name khorashad derives from the Pahlavi-language word meaning "sun."

== Demographics ==
=== Language and ethnicity ===
The people of Khorashad are Persian and the local language contains many words from the ancient Sassanid and Pahlavi languages.

=== Population ===
At the time of the 2006 National Census, the village's population was 757 in 232 households. The following census in 2011 counted 379 people in 148 households. The 2016 census measured the population of the village as 626 people in 236 households.

== Geography ==
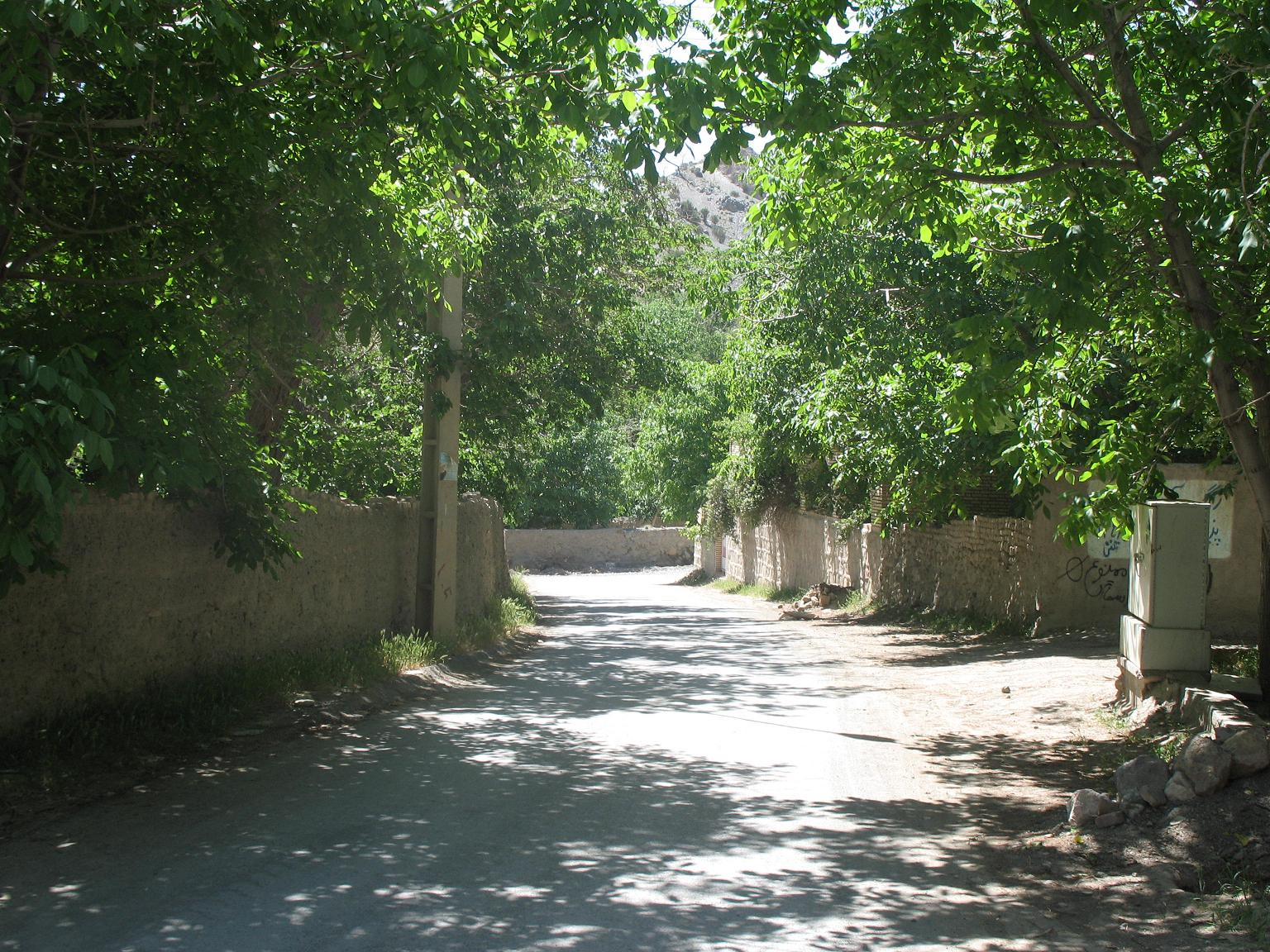

Khorashad is 24 km (15 mi) southeast of Birjand in east of Iran. The village is 2,064 m (6,772 ft) above sea level. It situated in the Khorashad Valley in Bagheran Mountain Range. It has cold winters and cool summers.

== Notable people ==
Khorashad is the birthplace of the notables such as:

- Dr. Mohammad Ismail Rezvani, a prominent professor of history in Iran
- Dr. Mohammad Reza Hafeznia, professor of geopolitics in Tarbiat Modarres University)
- Mr. Morteza Hassanpour, the first man in nursing in Iran
- Dr. Ghazanfar Forouzanfar, Director of the City Council of Birjand)
- Dr. Homayun Hadavinia, professor at Kingston University
- Dr. M. Khorashadizadeh, Director of Birjand University of Applied Science and Technology
- Dr. Ahmad Khosravi Khorashad, professor of medicine and Internal Medicine Specialist Physician at Mashhad Medical University

and more than 60 professors and physicians in universities of Iran, the United States, and England.
