= Taqcharabad =

Taqcharabad تقچراباد
- Village
- Location within Iran
- Coordinates: 32°59′27″N 59°23′27″E
- Country: Iran
- Province: South Khorasan
- County: Birjand
- Bakhsh: Central
- Rural District: Kahshang

Population (2006)
  - Total: 8
- Time zone: UTC+3:30 (IRST)
  - Summer (DST): UTC+4:30 (IRDT)

Taqcharabad (Persian: تقچراباد, also Romanized as Taqcharābād, Takhcharābād, Takhcherābād, Takhchīrābād, Takhjerābād, and Takhtjerābād; also known as Chaqcherābād and Takht jer) is a village in Kahshang Rural District, in the Central District of Birjand County, South Khorasan Province, Iran. At the 2006 census, its population was 8, consisting of 5 families.
