= Kalateh-ye Hajji Yusof =

Kalateh-ye Hajji Yusof كلاته حاجي يوسف
- Village
- Location within Iran
- Coordinates: 32°55′00″N 59°18′00″E
- Country: Iran
- Province: South Khorasan
- County: Birjand
- Bakhsh: Central
- Rural District: Baqeran

Population (2006)
  - Total: 64
- Time zone: UTC+3:30 (IRST)
  - Summer (DST): UTC+4:30 (IRDT)

Kalateh-ye Hajji Yusof (Persian: كلاته حاجي يوسف, also Romanized as Kalāteh-ye Ḩājjī Yūsof; also known as Kalāteh-ye Ḩājjī Yūsof Khān, Kalāteh Hāji Khān, Kalateh Haji Yoosef Khan, and Kalāteh-ye Ḩājjī Khān) is a village in Baqeran Rural District, in the Central District of Birjand County, South Khorasan Province, Iran. At the 2006 census, its population was 64, in 16 families.
