= Dohlkuh =

Dohlkuh دهل كوه
- Village
- Location within Iran
- Coordinates: 32°54′32″N 59°14′58″E
- Country: Iran
- Province: South Khorasan
- County: Birjand
- Bakhsh: Central
- Rural District: Alqurat

Population (2006)
  - Total: 696
- Time zone: UTC+3:30 (IRST)
  - Summer (DST): UTC+4:30 (IRDT)

Dohlkuh (Persian: دهل كوه, also Romanized as Dohlḵūh) is a village in Alqurat Rural District, in the Central District of Birjand County, South Khorasan Province, Iran. As of the 2006 census, its population was 696, distributed among 191 families.
