= Roqui-ye Pain =

Roqui-ye Pain رقوئي پائين
- Village
- Location within Iran
- Coordinates: 32°50′07″N 59°11′38″E
- Country: Iran
- Province: South Khorasan
- County: Birjand
- Bakhsh: Central
- Rural District: Baqeran

Population (2006)
  - Total: 8
- Time zone: UTC+3:30 (IRST)
  - Summer (DST): UTC+4:30 (IRDT)

Roqui-ye Pain (Persian: رقوئي پائين, also Romanized as Roqū’ī-ye Pā’īn; also known as Roqū’ī) is a village in Baqeran Rural District, in the Central District of Birjand County, South Khorasan Province, Iran. At the 2006 census, its population was 8, in 4 families.
