= Esfahrud =

Esfahrud اسفهرود
- Village
- Location within Iran
- Coordinates: 32°48′21″N 59°18′13″E
- Country: Iran
- Province: South Khorasan
- County: Birjand
- Bakhsh: Central
- Rural District: Baqeran

Population (2006)
  - Total: 192
- Time zone: UTC+3:30 (IRST)
  - Summer (DST): UTC+4:30 (IRDT)

Esfahrud (Persian: اسفهرود, also Romanized as Esfahrūd, Esfahrood, and Esfeh Rūd; also known as Espahrūd, Esfī Rūd, and Isfehrūd) is a village in Baqeran Rural District, in the Central District of Birjand County, South Khorasan Province, Iran. At the 2006 census, its population was 192, in 68 families.
