= Chahardeh-ye Pain =

Chahardeh-ye Pain چهارده پائين
- Village
- Location within Iran
- Coordinates: 32°49′08″N 59°14′12″E
- Country: Iran
- Province: South Khorasan
- County: Birjand
- Bakhsh: Central
- Rural District: Baqeran

Population (2006)
  - Total: 29
- Time zone: UTC+3:30 (IRST)
  - Summer (DST): UTC+4:30 (IRDT)

Chahardeh-ye Pain (Persian: چهارده پائين, also Romanized as Chahārdeh-e Pā’īn; also known as Chārdeh-ye Pā’īn, Chahār Deh, Char Deh Bālā, and Chehārdeh) is a village in Baqeran Rural District, in the Central District of Birjand County, South Khorasan Province, Iran. At the 2006 census, its population was 29, in 10 families.
