= Chahardeh-ye Bala =

Chahardeh-ye Bala چهارده بالا
- Village
- Location within Iran
- Coordinates: 32°49′01″N 59°14′09″E
- Country: Iran
- Province: South Khorasan
- County: Birjand
- Bakhsh: Central
- Rural District: Baqeran

Population (2006)
  - Total: 26
- Time zone: UTC+3:30 (IRST)
  - Summer (DST): UTC+4:30 (IRDT)

Chahardeh-ye Bala (Persian: چهارده بالا, also Romanized as Chahārdeh-e Bālā; also known as Chārdeh-ye Bālā) is a village in Baqeran Rural District, in the Central District of Birjand County, South Khorasan Province, Iran. At the 2006 census, its population was 26, in 12 families.
