= Rekat =

Rekat or Rikat or Rokat (Persian: ركات) may refer to:

- Rekat-e Olya
- Rekat-e Sofla

Alternatively:

- Rekat may refer to the Turkish pronunciation of the Islamic term: Rak'ah
