= Aliabad-e Luleh =

Village in South Khorasan province, Iran

Aliabad-e Luleh Persian: علي ابادلوله
- Village
- Location within Iran
- Coordinates: 32°49′30″N 59°15′46″E
- Country: Iran
- Province: South Khorasan
- County: Birjand
- District: Central
- Rural District: Baqeran

Population (2016)
  - Total: 896
- Time zone: UTC+3:30 (IRST)

Aliabad-e Luleh (Persian: علي ابادلوله,) (Note: Also romanized as Ali Abad Looleh, ‘Alīābād Lūleh, and ‘Alīābād-e Lūleh; also known as ‘Alīābād) is a village in Baqeran Rural District of the Central District in Birjand County, South Khorasan province, Iran.

== Demographics ==
=== Population ===
At the time of the 2006 National Census, the village's population was 389 in 102 households. The following census in 2011 counted 708 people in 190 households. The 2016 census measured the population of the village as 896 people in 238 households.
