= Hajj Naj =

Village in South Khorasan province, Iran

Hajj Naj Persian: حج نج
- Village
- Location within Iran
- Coordinates: 33°08′46″N 58°56′04″E
- Country: Iran
- Province: South Khorasan
- County: Birjand
- District: Central
- Rural District: Fasharud

Population (2016)
  - Total: 129
- Time zone: UTC+3:30 (IRST)

Hajj Naj (Persian: حج نج) (Note: Also romanized as Ḩājj Naj) is a village in Fasharud Rural District of the Central District in Birjand County, South Khorasan province, Iran.

== Demographics ==
=== Population ===
At the time of the 2006 National Census, the village's population was 71 in 22 households. The following census in 2011 counted 71 people in 27 households. The 2016 census measured the population of the village as 129 people in 40 households.
