= Afkasht =

Village in South Khorasan province, Iran

Afkasht Persian: افكشت
- Village
- Location within Iran
- Coordinates: 33°04′21″N 58°47′16″E
- Country: Iran
- Province: South Khorasan
- County: Birjand
- District: Central
- Rural District: Fasharud

Population (2016)
  - Total: 118
- Time zone: UTC+3:30 (IRST)

Afkasht (Persian: افكشت) (Note: Also romanized as Āfḵasht) is a village in Fasharud Rural District of the Central District in Birjand County, South Khorasan province, Iran.

== Demographics ==
=== Population ===
At the time of the 2006 National Census, the village's population was 170 in 39 households. The following census in 2011 counted 146 people in 38 households. The 2016 census measured the population of the village as 118 people in 34 households.
