= Kuch Elqar =

Village in South Khorasan province, Iran

Kuch Elqar Persian: كوچ القار
- Village
- Location within Iran
- Coordinates: 32°54′57″N 59°31′13″E
- Country: Iran
- Province: South Khorasan
- County: Birjand
- District: Central
- Rural District: Kahshang

Population (2016)
  - Total: 178
- Time zone: UTC+3:30 (IRST)

Kuch Elqar (Persian: كوچ القار) (Note: Also romanized as Kūch Elqār; also known as Kooch Mo’men Abad and Kūch) is a village in Kahshang Rural District of the Central District in Birjand County, South Khorasan province, Iran.

== Demographics ==
=== Population ===
At the time of the 2006 National Census, the village's population was 127 in 34 households. The following census in 2011 counted 122 people in 36 households. The 2016 census measured the population of the village as 178 people in 53 households.
