= Siskan =

Village in South Khorasan province, Iran

Siskan Persian: سيسكان
- Village
- Location within Iran
- Coordinates: 33°03′29″N 59°26′22″E
- Country: Iran
- Province: South Khorasan
- County: Birjand
- District: Central
- Rural District: Kahshang

Population (2016)
  - Total: 142
- Time zone: UTC+3:30 (IRST)

Siskan (Persian: سيسكان) (Note: Also romanized as Siskān; also known as Sīgān and Sīsgān (سيسگان)) is a village in Kahshang Rural District of the Central District in Birjand County, South Khorasan province, Iran.

== Demographics ==
=== Population ===
At the time of the 2006 National Census, the village's population was 232 in 68 households. The following census in 2011 counted 169 people in 50 households. The 2016 census measured the population of the village as 142 people in 48 households.
