= Dastgerd, Birjand =

Village in South Khorasan province, Iran

Dastgerd Persian: دستگرد
- Village
- Location within Iran
- Coordinates: 32°55′14″N 59°17′45″E
- Country: Iran
- Province: South Khorasan
- County: Birjand
- District: Central
- Rural District: Alqurat

Population (2016)
  - Total: 3,365
- Time zone: UTC+3:30 (IRST)

Dastgerd (Persian: دستگرد) (Note: Also known as Dastgerd Shahabad, Dastgird, and Dastīgerd) is a village in Alqurat Rural District of the Central District in Birjand County, South Khorasan province, Iran.

== Demographics ==
=== Population ===
At the time of the 2006 National Census, the village's population was 296 in 91 households. The following census in 2011 counted 1,328 people in 373 households. The 2016 census measured the population of the village as 3,365 people in 898 households, the most populous in its rural district.
