= Afzalabad, Birjand =

Village in South Khorasan province, Iran

Afzalabad Persian: افضل اباد
- Village
- Location within Iran
- Coordinates: 33°08′00″N 59°10′26″E
- Country: Iran
- Province: South Khorasan
- County: Birjand
- District: Central
- Rural District: Fasharud

Population (2016)
  - Total: 146
- Time zone: UTC+3:30 (IRST)

Afzalabad (Persian: افضل اباد) (Note: Also romanized as Afzalābād) is a village in Fasharud Rural District of the Central District in Birjand County, South Khorasan province, Iran.

== Demographics ==
=== Population ===
At the time of the 2006 National Census, the village's population was 149 in 62 households. The following census in 2011 counted 130 people in 57 households. The 2016 census measured the population of the village as 146 people in 56 households.
