= Naqenj =

Village in South Khorasan province, Iran

Naqenj Persian: نقنج
- Village
- Location within Iran
- Coordinates: 33°09′30″N 59°28′45″E
- Country: Iran
- Province: South Khorasan
- County: Birjand
- District: Central
- Rural District: Alqurat

Population (2016)
  - Total: 296
- Time zone: UTC+3:30 (IRST)

Naqenj (Persian: نقنج) (Note: Also known as Nāghuni and Naqūnī) is a village in Alqurat Rural District of the Central District in Birjand County, South Khorasan province, Iran.

== Demographics ==
=== Population ===
At the time of the 2006 National Census, the village's population was 562 in 147 households. The following census in 2011 counted 363 people in 121 households. The 2016 census measured the population of the village as 296 people in 123 households.
