= Bojd =

Village in South Khorasan province, Iran

Bojd Persian: بجد
- Village
- Location within Iran
- Coordinates: 32°50′20″N 59°19′37″E
- Country: Iran
- Province: South Khorasan
- County: Birjand
- District: Central
- Rural District: Baqeran

Population (2016)
  - Total: 1,100
- Time zone: UTC+3:30 (IRST)

Bojd (Persian: بجد) (Note: Also known as Bojdī, Bozhd, and Būjd) is a village in Baqeran Rural District of the Central District in Birjand County, South Khorasan province, Iran.

== Demographics ==
=== Population ===
At the time of the 2006 National Census, the village's population was 762 in 207 households. The following census in 2011 counted 1,041 people in 306 households. The 2016 census measured the population of the village as 1,100 people in 303 households.
