= Hajjiabad, Alqurat =

Village in South Khorasan province, Iran

Hajjiabad Persian: حاجي اباد
- Village
- Location within Iran
- Coordinates: 33°00′11″N 59°18′09″E
- Country: Iran
- Province: South Khorasan
- County: Birjand
- District: Central
- Rural District: Alqurat

Population (2016)
  - Total: 109
- Time zone: UTC+3:30 (IRST)

Hajjiabad (Persian: حاجي اباد) (Note: Also romanized as Ḩājīābād and Hājjīābād) is a village in, and the capital of, Alqurat Rural District in the Central District of Birjand County, South Khorasan province, Iran.

== Demographics ==
=== Population ===
At the time of the 2006 National Census, the village's population was 41 in 14 households. The following census in 2011 counted 64 people in 27 households. The 2016 census measured the population of the village as 109 people in 38 households.
