= Shekaraneh =

Village in South Khorasan province, Iran

Shekaraneh Persian: شكرانه
- Village
- Location within Iran
- Coordinates: 32°56′54″N 59°13′26″E
- Country: Iran
- Province: South Khorasan
- County: Birjand
- District: Central
- Rural District: Alqurat

Population (2016)
  - Total: 302
- Time zone: UTC+3:30 (IRST)

Shekaraneh (Persian: شكرانه) (Note: Also romanized as Shekarāneh; also known as Shakar Āb, Shekar Āb, Shekar Āb-e Bālā, Shekar Āb ‘Olyā, Shekarāb-e Pā’īn (شكراب پايين), and Shikārāb) is a village in Alqurat Rural District of the Central District in Birjand County, South Khorasan province, Iran.

== Demographics ==
=== Population ===
At the time of the 2006 National Census, the village's population was 172 in 52 households. The following census in 2011 counted 139 people in 48 households. The 2016 census measured the population of the village as 302 people in 92 households.
