= Taj Kuh, Birjand =

Village in South Khorasan province, Iran

Taj Kuh Persian: تاج كوه
- Village
- Location within Iran
- Coordinates: 33°11′45″N 58°48′21″E
- Country: Iran
- Province: South Khorasan
- County: Birjand
- District: Central
- Rural District: Fasharud

Population (2016)
  - Total: 109
- Time zone: UTC+3:30 (IRST)

Taj Kuh (Persian: تاج كوه) (Note: Also romanized as Tāj Kūh) is a village in Fasharud Rural District of the Central District in Birjand County, South Khorasan province, Iran.

== Demographics ==
=== Population ===
At the time of the 2006 National Census, the village's population was 77 in 25 households. The following census in 2011 counted 56 people in 19 households. The 2016 census measured the population of the village as 109 people in 35 households.
