= Feriz Morgh =

Feriz Morgh فريزمرغ
- Village
- Location within Iran
- Coordinates: 32°40′44″N 59°27′06″E
- Country: Iran
- Province: South Khorasan
- County: Birjand
- Bakhsh: Central
- Rural District: Baqeran

Population (2006)
  - Total: 78
- Time zone: UTC+3:30 (IRST)
  - Summer (DST): UTC+4:30 (IRDT)

Feriz Morgh (Persian: فريزمرغ, also Romanized as Ferīz Morgh, Farīz Morgh, and Farīzmurg) is a village in Baqeran Rural District, in the Central District of Birjand County, South Khorasan Province, Iran. At the 2006 census, its population was 78, in 24 families.
