= Roqiyehabad =

Village in South Khorasan province, Iran

Roqiyehabad Persian: رقیه آباد
- Village
- Location within Iran
- Coordinates: 32°56′44″N 59°33′25″E
- Country: Iran
- Province: South Khorasan
- County: Birjand
- District: Central
- Rural District: Kahshang

Population (2016)
  - Total: 137
- Time zone: UTC+3:30 (IRST)

Roqiyehabad (Persian: رقیه آباد) (Note: Also romanized as Roqīyehābād and Roqyehābād; also known as Rīgābād and Roqīābād) is a village in Kahshang Rural District of the Central District in Birjand County, South Khorasan province, Iran.

== Demographics ==
=== Population ===
At the time of the 2006 National Census, the village's population was 221 in 60 households. The following census in 2011 counted 205 people in 68 households. The 2016 census measured the population of the village as 137 people in 50 households.
