= Givak-e Sofla =

Givak-e Sofla گيوك سفلي
- Village
- Location within Iran
- Coordinates: 32°47′40″N 59°07′26″E
- Country: Iran
- Province: South Khorasan
- County: Birjand
- Bakhsh: Central
- Rural District: Baqeran

Population (2006)
  - Total: 28
- Time zone: UTC+3:30 (IRST)
  - Summer (DST): UTC+4:30 (IRDT)

Givak-e Sofla (Persian: گيوك سفلي, also Romanized as Gīvak-e Soflá and Geyūk Soflá; also known as Gīvak-e Pā’īn and Givak Pa’in) is a village in Baqeran Rural District, in the Central District of Birjand County, South Khorasan Province, Iran. At the 2006 census, its population was 28, in 11 families.
