= Showkatabad, South Khorasan =

Village in South Khorasan province, Iran

Showkatabad Persian: شوكت آباد
- Village
- Location within Iran
- Coordinates: 32°51′20″N 59°17′50″E
- Country: Iran
- Province: South Khorasan
- County: Birjand
- District: Central
- Rural District: Baqeran

Population (2016)
  - Total: 574
- Time zone: UTC+3:30 (IRST)

Showkatabad (Persian: شوكت آباد,) (Note: Also romanized as Showḵatābād) is a village in Baqeran Rural District of the Central District in Birjand County, South Khorasan province, Iran.

== Demographics ==
=== Population ===
The village did not appear in the 2006 National Census. The following census in 2011 counted 512 people in 144 households. The 2016 census measured the population of the village as 574 people in 143 households.
