= Hajjiabad, Birjand =

Village in South Khorasan province, Iran

Hajjiabad Persian: حاجي اباد
- Village
- Location within Iran
- Coordinates: 32°53′01″N 59°09′29″E
- Country: Iran
- Province: South Khorasan
- County: Birjand
- District: Central
- Rural District: Baqeran

Population (2016)
  - Total: 7,749
- Time zone: UTC+3:30 (IRST)

Hajjiabad (Persian: حاجي اباد) (Note: Also romanized as Ḩājīābād, Hājiābād, and Hajjīābād; also known as Haji Abad Nahar Khan and Kālateh-ye Ḩājjī) is a village in Baqeran Rural District of the Central District in Birjand County, South Khorasan province, Iran.

== Demographics ==
=== Population ===
At the time of the 2006 National Census, the village's population was 1,821 in 495 households. The following census in 2011 counted 6,500 people in 1,846 households. The 2016 census measured the population of the village as 7,749 people in 2,078 households, the most populous in its rural district.
