= Shushud =

Village in South Khorasan province, Iran

Shushud Persian: شوشود
- Village
- Location within Iran
- Coordinates: 33°06′06″N 59°03′07″E
- Country: Iran
- Province: South Khorasan
- County: Birjand
- District: Central
- Rural District: Fasharud

Population (2016)
  - Total: 460
- Time zone: UTC+3:30 (IRST)

Shushud (Persian: شوشود) (Note: Also romanized as Shūshūd; also known as Shūshūd-e Bālā) is a village in Fasharud Rural District of the Central District in Birjand County, South Khorasan province, Iran.

== Demographics ==
=== Population ===
At the time of the 2006 National Census, the village's population was 615 in 170 households. The following census in 2011 counted 450 people in 141 households. The 2016 census measured the population of the village as 460 people in 141 households, the most populous in its rural district.
