= Sar Chah-e Tazian =

Village in South Khorasan province, Iran

Sar Chah-e Tazian Persian: سرچاه تازيان
- Village
- Location within Iran
- Coordinates: 33°01′08″N 59°33′37″E
- Country: Iran
- Province: South Khorasan
- County: Birjand
- District: Central
- Rural District: Kahshang

Population (2016)
  - Total: 461
- Time zone: UTC+3:30 (IRST)

Sar Chah-e Tazian (Persian: سرچاه تازيان) (Note: Also romanized as Sar Chāh-e Tāzīān; also known as Sar Chāh and Sar-i-Chāh) is a village in Kahshang Rural District of the Central District in Birjand County, South Khorasan province, Iran.

== Demographics ==
=== Population ===
At the time of the 2006 National Census, the village's population was 416 in 119 households. The following census in 2011 counted 391 people in 107 households. The 2016 census measured the population of the village as 461 people in 135 households.
