= Boz Quch-e Olya =

Boz Quch-e Olya بزقوچ عليا
- Village
- Location within Iran
- Coordinates: 33°00′41″N 59°26′31″E
- Country: Iran
- Province: South Khorasan
- County: Birjand
- Bakhsh: Central
- Rural District: Kahshang

Population (2006)
  - Total: 74
- Time zone: UTC+3:30 (IRST)
  - Summer (DST): UTC+4:30 (IRDT)

Boz Quch-e Olya (Persian: بزقوچ عليا, also Romanized as Boz Qūch-e ‘Olyā and Bozqūch-e ‘Olyā; also known as Boz Qūch-e Bālā (Persian: بزقوچ بالا), Bozqūch Bālā, Buzqūch, and Boz Qūch) is a village in Kahshang Rural District, in the Central District of Birjand County, South Khorasan Province, Iran. At the 2006 census, its population was 74, in 22 families.
