= Nowferest =

Village in South Khorasan province, Iran

Noferest Persian: نوفرست
- Village
- Location within Iran
- Coordinates: 32°45′30″N 59°26′20″E
- Country: Iran
- Province: South Khorasan
- County: Birjand
- District: Central
- Rural District: Baqeran

Population (2016)
  - Total: 497
- Time zone: UTC+3:30 (IRST)

Noferest (Persian: نوفرست) (Note: Also romanized as Now Forşat; also known as Naufirist) is a village in Baqeran Rural District of the Central District in Birjand County, South Khorasan province, Iran.

== Demographics ==
=== Population ===
At the time of the 2006 National Census, the village's population was 353 in 137 households. The following census in 2011 counted 779 people in 272 households. The 2016 census measured the population of the village as 497 people in 178 households.
