= Hesar-e Sangi =

Village in South Khorasan province, Iran

Hesar-e Sangi Persian: حصارسنگي
- Village
- Location within Iran
- Coordinates: 33°08′28″N 58°49′47″E
- Country: Iran
- Province: South Khorasan
- County: Birjand
- District: Central
- Rural District: Fasharud

Population (2016)
  - Total: 275
- Time zone: UTC+3:30 (IRST)

Hesar-e Sangi (Persian: حصارسنگي) (Note: Also romanized as Ḩeşār-e Sangī; also known as Ḩeşār and Hisār) is a village in Fasharud Rural District of the Central District in Birjand County, South Khorasan province, Iran.

== Demographics ==
=== Population ===
At the time of the 2006 National Census, the village's population was 266 in 77 households. The following census in 2011 counted 225 people in 75 households. The 2016 census measured the population of the village as 275 people in 97 households.
