= Kondor, Birjand =

Village in South Khorasan province, Iran

Kondor Persian: كندر
- Village
- Location within Iran
- Coordinates: 33°12′26″N 59°06′51″E
- Country: Iran
- Province: South Khorasan
- County: Birjand
- District: Central
- Rural District: Fasharud

Population (2016)
  - Total: 92
- Time zone: UTC+3:30 (IRST)

Kondor (Persian: كندر) (Note: Also known as Kandel and Kundar) is a village in, and the capital of, Fasharud Rural District in the Central District of Birjand County, South Khorasan province, Iran.

== Demographics ==
=== Population ===
At the time of the 2006 National Census, the village's population was 155 in 56 households. The following census in 2011 counted 122 people in 46 households. The 2016 census measured the population of the village as 92 people in 40 households.
