= Rekat-e Olya =

Rekat-e Olya ركاتعليا
- Village
- Location within Iran
- Coordinates: 32°48′33″N 59°04′24″E
- Country: Iran
- Province: South Khorasan
- County: Birjand
- Bakhsh: Central
- Rural District: Baqeran

Population (2006)
  - Total: 86
- Time zone: UTC+3:30 (IRST)
  - Summer (DST): UTC+4:30 (IRDT)

Rekat-e Olya (Persian: ركاتعليا, also Romanized as Rekāt-e ‘Olyā and Rekat Olya; also known as Rekāt-e Bālā, Rekāt, Rekāt-e ‘Olyā, Rīkat-e Bālā, and Rokāt Bālā) is a village in Baqeran Rural District, in the Central District of Birjand County, South Khorasan Province, Iran. At the 2006 census, its population was 86, in 35 families.
