= Amirabad-e Pain, South Khorasan =

Village in South Khorasan province, Iran

Amirabad-e Pain Persian: اميرآباد پائين
- Village
- Location within Iran
- Coordinates: 32°52′26″N 59°08′30″E
- Country: Iran
- Province: South Khorasan
- County: Birjand
- District: Central
- Rural District: Baqeran

Population (2016)
  - Total: 7,177
- Time zone: UTC+3:30 (IRST)

Amirabad-e Pain (Persian: اميرابادپائين) (Note: Also romanized as Amīrābād Pā’īn and Amīrābād-e Pāīn; also known as Kalāteh-ye Khān) is a village in, and the capital of, Baqeran Rural District in the Central District of Birjand County, South Khorasan province, Iran.

== Demographics ==
=== Population ===
At the time of the 2006 National Census, the village's population was 2,927 in 773 households. The following census in 2011 counted 6,588 people in 1,631 households. The 2016 census measured the population of the village as 7,177 people in 1,847 households.
