= Kalateh-ye Bojdi =

Village in South Khorasan province, Iran

Kalateh-ye Bojdi Persian: كلاته بجدي
- Village
- Location within Iran
- Coordinates: 32°56′49″N 59°17′48″E
- Country: Iran
- Province: South Khorasan
- County: Birjand
- District: Central
- Rural District: Alqurat

Population (2016)
  - Total: 316
- Time zone: UTC+3:30 (IRST)

Kalateh-ye Bojdi (Persian: كلاته بجدي) (Note: Also romanized as Kalāteh-ye Bojdī; also known as Bojd, Bojdī, Kalāt-e Bojdīn, Kalāteh-i-Būjd, Kalāteh-ye Bojīr, and Kalāteh-ye Būzhadī) is a village in Alqurat Rural District of the Central District in Birjand County, South Khorasan province, Iran.

== Demographics ==
=== Population ===
At the time of the 2006 National Census, the village's population was 173 in 50 households. The following census in 2011 counted 146 people in 44 households. The 2016 census measured the population of the village as 316 people in 87 households.
