= Gugchin =

Village in South Khorasan province, Iran

Gugchin Persian: گوگچين
- Village
- Location within Iran
- Coordinates: 33°04′19″N 59°33′10″E
- Country: Iran
- Province: South Khorasan
- County: Birjand
- District: Central
- Rural District: Kahshang

Population (2016)
  - Total: 190
- Time zone: UTC+3:30 (IRST)

Gugchin (Persian: گوگچين) (Note: Also romanized as Gūgchīn; also known as Gūgchī and Gukchin) is a village in Kahshang Rural District of the Central District in Birjand County, South Khorasan province, Iran.

== Demographics ==
=== Population ===
At the time of the 2006 National Census, the village's population was 273 in 87 households. The following census in 2011 counted 202 people in 85 households. The 2016 census measured the population of the village as 190 people in 75 households.
