= Feriz Nuk =

Feriz Nuk فريزنوك
- Village
- Location within Iran
- Coordinates: 33°00′46″N 59°07′21″E
- Country: Iran
- Province: South Khorasan
- County: Birjand
- Bakhsh: Central
- Rural District: Baqeran

Population (2006)
  - Total: 65
- Time zone: UTC+3:30 (IRST)
  - Summer (DST): UTC+4:30 (IRDT)

Feriz Nuk (Persian: فريزنوك, also Romanized as Ferīz Nūk, Ferīznūk, Fīrīznuk, and Fīrūznok) is a village in Baqeran Rural District, in the Central District of Birjand County, South Khorasan Province, Iran. As of the 2006 census, its population was 65, in 15 families.
