= Mirozg =

Village in South Khorasan province, Iran

Mirozg Persian: میرزگ
- Village
- Location within Iran
- Coordinates: 33°04′40″N 59°29′35″E
- Country: Iran
- Province: South Khorasan
- County: Birjand
- District: Central
- Rural District: Kahshang

Population (2016)
  - Total: 207
- Time zone: UTC+3:30 (IRST)

Mirozg (Persian: ميرزگ) (Note: Also romanized as Mīrozg; also known as Mīrīz and Mīrozk) is a village in Kahshang Rural District of the Central District in Birjand County, South Khorasan province, Iran.

== Demographics ==
=== Population ===
At the time of the 2006 National Census, the village's population was 112 in 42 households. The following census in 2011 counted 78 people in 35 households. The 2016 census measured the population of the village as 207 people in 64 households.
