= Boz Quch =

Boz Quch or Bozquch or Buzquch or Bozghooch (Persian: بزقوچ) may refer to:

- Boz Quch-e Olya
- Boz Quch-e Sofla
