= Shirag =

Shirag شيرگ
- Village
- Location within Iran
- Coordinates: 33°12′40″N 59°05′25″E
- Country: Iran
- Province: South Khorasan
- County: Birjand
- Bakhsh: Central
- Rural District: Fasharud

Population (2016)
  - Total: 79
- Time zone: UTC+3:30 (IRST)
  - Summer (DST): UTC+4:30 (IRDT)

Shirag (Persian: شيرگ, also Romanized as Shīrag, Shīrīk, Sherk, Shīrak, and Shīrg; also known as Tak-e Borj) is a village in Fasharud Rural District, in the Central District of Birjand County, South Khorasan Province, Iran. At the 2016 census, its population was 79, in 31 families.
