= Givak-e Olya =

Givak-e Olya گيوك عليا
- Village
- Location within Iran
- Coordinates: 32°48′21″N 59°08′09″E
- Country: Iran
- Province: South Khorasan
- County: Birjand
- Bakhsh: Central
- Rural District: Baqeran

Population (2006)
  - Total: 27
- Time zone: UTC+3:30 (IRST)
  - Summer (DST): UTC+4:30 (IRDT)

Givak-e Olya (Persian: گيوك عليا, also Romanized as Gīvak-e ‘Olyā, Geyūk ‘Olyā, and Givak Olya; also known as Gīvak-e Bālā) is a village in Baqeran Rural District, in the Central District of Birjand County, South Khorasan Province, Iran. At the 2006 census, its population was 27, in 12 families.
