= Rekat-e Sofla =

Rekat-e Sofla ركاتسفلي
- Village
- Location within Iran
- Coordinates: 32°48′52″N 59°04′06″E
- Country: Iran
- Province: South Khorasan
- County: Birjand
- Bakhsh: Central
- Rural District: Baqeran

Population (2006)
  - Total: 83
- Time zone: UTC+3:30 (IRST)
  - Summer (DST): UTC+4:30 (IRDT)

Rekat-e Sofla (Persian: ركاتسفلي, also Romanized as Rekāt-e Soflá and Rekat Soflá; also known as Rekāt-e Pā’īn, Rikāt, Rīkat-e Pā’īn, and Rokāt Pā’īn) is a village in Baqeran Rural District, in the Central District of Birjand County, South Khorasan Province, Iran. At the 2006 census, its population was 83, in 28 families.
