= Chah Kand, Fasharud =

Chah Kand چهكند
- Village
- Location within Iran
- Coordinates: 32°11′19.6″N 59°14′07.1″E
- Country: Iran
- Province: South Khorasan
- County: Birjand
- Bakhsh: Central
- Rural District: Fasharud

Population (2016)
  - Total: 99
- Time zone: UTC+3:30 (IRST)
  - Summer (DST): UTC+4:30 (IRDT)

Chah Kand (Persian: چهكند, also Romanized as Chāh Kand) is a village in Fasharud Rural District, in the Central District of Birjand County, South Khorasan Province, Iran. At the 2016 census, its population was 99, in 50 families.
