= Givak =

Givak or Geyuk (Persian: گيوك) may refer to:

- Givak-e Olya
- Givak-e Sofla

== See also ==
- Göyük (disambiguation)
