= Zirak, Birjand =

Village in South Khorasan province, Iran

Zirak Persian: زيرك
- Village
- Location within Iran
- Coordinates: 33°02′54″N 59°27′34″E
- Country: Iran
- Province: South Khorasan
- County: Birjand
- District: Central
- Rural District: Kahshang

Population (2016)
  - Total: 165
- Time zone: UTC+3:30 (IRST)

Zirak (Persian: زيرك) (Note: Also romanized as Zīrak; also known as Zirg) is a village in Kahshang Rural District of the Central District in Birjand County, South Khorasan province, Iran.

== Demographics ==
=== Population ===
At the time of the 2006 National Census, the village's population was 161 in 59 households. The following census in 2011 counted 141 people in 57 households. The 2016 census measured the population of the village as 165 people in 55 households.
