= Boz Quch-e Sofla =

Boz Quch-e Sofla بزقوچ سفلي
- Village
- Location within Iran
- Coordinates: 32°59′00″N 59°26′00″E
- Country: Iran
- Province: South Khorasan
- County: Birjand
- Bakhsh: Central
- Rural District: Kahshang

Population (2006)
  - Total: 34
- Time zone: UTC+3:30 (IRST)
  - Summer (DST): UTC+4:30 (IRDT)

Boz Quch-e Sofla (Persian: بزقوچ سفلي, also romanized as Boz Qūch-e Soflá, Buzqūch Sofla, and Bozghooch Sofla; also known as Boz Qūch-e Pā’īn) is a village in Kahshang Rural District, in the Central District of Birjand County, South Khorasan Province, Iran. At the 2006 census, its population was 34, in 12 families.
