= Hambal =

Village in South Khorasan province, Iran

Hambal Persian: حمبل
- Village
- Location within Iran
- Coordinates: 33°09′46″N 59°14′01″E
- Country: Iran
- Province: South Khorasan
- County: Birjand
- District: Central
- Rural District: Fasharud

Population (2016)
  - Total: 106
- Time zone: UTC+3:30 (IRST)

Hambal (Persian: حمبل) (Note: Also romanized as Ḩambal; also known as Ḩammāl) is a village in Fasharud Rural District of the Central District in Birjand County, South Khorasan province, Iran.

== Demographics ==
=== Population ===
At the time of the 2006 National Census, the village's population was 108 in 35 households. The following census in 2011 counted 92 people in 38 households. The 2016 census measured the population of the village as 106 people in 41 households.
