= Marak, Iran =

Village in South Khorasan province, Iran

Marak Persian: مرك
- Village
- Location within Iran
- Coordinates: 32°55′18″N 59°25′41″E
- Country: Iran
- Province: South Khorasan
- County: Birjand
- District: Central
- Rural District: Kahshang

Population (2016)
  - Total: 569
- Time zone: UTC+3:30 (IRST)

Marak (Persian: مرك) (Note: Also romanized as Marāk) is a village in, and the capital of, Kahshang Rural District in the Central District of Birjand County, South Khorasan province, Iran.

== Demographics ==
=== Population ===
At the time of the 2006 National Census, the village's population was 532 in 136 households. The following census in 2011 counted 568 people in 155 households. The 2016 census measured the population of the village as 569 people in 151 households, the most populous in its rural district.
