= Kalaj Darg =

Kalaj Darg كلاج درگ
- Village
- Location within Iran
- Coordinates: 33°07′55″N 59°21′54″E
- Country: Iran
- Province: South Khorasan
- County: Birjand
- Bakhsh: Central
- Rural District: Alqurat

Population (2006)
  - Total: 10
- Time zone: UTC+3:30 (IRST)
  - Summer (DST): UTC+4:30 (IRDT)

Kalaj Darg (Persian: كلاج درگ, also Romanized as Kalāj Darg, Kalai Darak, Kalājderk, Kalazh Dark, and Kelājdarg; also known as Qal‘eh-ye Darak) is a village in Alqurat Rural District, in the Central District of Birjand County, South Khorasan Province, Iran. At the 2006 census, its population was 10, in 5 families.
