= Khorashad Castle =

Castle in South Khorasan Province, Iran

Khorashad castle
- قلعه خراشاد

General information
- Type: Castle
- Location: Birjand County, Iran

Khorashad castle (Persian: قلعه خراشاد) is a historical castle located in Birjand County in South Khorasan Province; the longevity of this fortress dates back to the 11th to 13th centuries AH.
