= Nowferest Castle =

Castle in South Khorasan Province, Iran

Nowferest castle
- قلعه نوفرست

General information
- Type: Castle
- Location: Birjand County, Iran

Nowferest castle (Persian: قلعه نوفرست) is a historical castle located in Birjand County in South Khorasan Province; the longevity of this fortress dates back to the 3rd and 4th centuries AH until the Safavid dynasty.
