= Chahkanduk Castle =

Castle in South Khorasan Province, Iran

Chahkanduk castle
- قلعه چهکندوک

General information
- Type: Castle
- Location: Birjand County, Iran

Chahkanduk castle (Persian: قلعه چهکندوک) is a historical castle located in Birjand County in South Khorasan Province; the longevity of this fortress dates back to the Qajar dynasty.
