= Koyuk =

Koyuk may refer to:

- Koyuk, Alaska
- Koyuk River
- Koyuk Alfred Adams Airport
- Köyük (disambiguation), several places in Azerbaijan
