= Chahkand, Baqeran =

Village in South Khorasan province, Iran

Chahkand Persian: چهكند
- Village
- Location within Iran
- Coordinates: 32°51′14″N 59°09′34″E
- Country: Iran
- Province: South Khorasan
- County: Birjand
- District: Central
- Rural District: Baqeran

Population (2016)
  - Total: 898
- Time zone: UTC+3:30 (IRST)

Chahkand (Persian: چهكند) (Note: Also romanized as Chāhkand; also known as Chahkandak) is a village in Baqeran Rural District of the Central District in Birjand County, South Khorasan province, Iran.

== Demographics ==
=== Population ===
At the time of the 2006 National Census, the village's population was 898 in 262 households. The following census in 2011 counted 2,732 people in 737 households. The 2016 census measured the population of the village as 4,569 people in 1,220 households.
