= Kamar Qala Castle =

Castle in South Khorasan Province, Iran

Kamar Qala castle
- قلعه کمر قلاع

General information
- Type: Castle
- Location: Birjand County, Iran

Kamar Qala castle (Persian: قلعه کمر قلاع) is a historical castle located in Birjand County in South Khorasan Province; the longevity of this fortress dates back to the Seljuk Empire.
