= Khong, South Khorasan =

Village in South Khorasan province, Iran

Khong Persian: خنگ
- Village
- Location within Iran
- Coordinates: 33°14′17″N 59°20′10″E
- Country: Iran
- Province: South Khorasan
- County: Birjand
- District: Central
- Rural District: Alqurat

Population (2016)
  - Total: 353
- Time zone: UTC+3:30 (IRST)

Khong (Persian: خنگ) (Note: Also romanized as Khang; also known as Khank and Khung) is a village in Alqurat Rural District of the Central District in Birjand County, South Khorasan province, Iran.

== Demographics ==
=== Population ===
At the time of the 2006 National Census, the village's population was 476 in 141 households. The following census in 2011 counted 392 people in 114 households. The 2016 census measured the population of the village as 353 people in 128 households.
