= Shirg =

Shirg may refer to several places in Iran:

- Shirag
- Shirk-e Sorjeh
