= Aliabad Castle, Birjand =

Castle in South Khorasan Province, Iran

Aliabad Castle
- قلعه علی‌آباد

General information
- Type: Castle
- Location: Birjand County, Iran

Aliabad Castle (Persian: قلعه علی‌آباد) is a historical castle located in Birjand County in South Khorasan Province; the longevity of this fortress dates back to the Qajar dynasty.
