= Asu, South Khorasan =

Village in South Khorasan province, Iran

Asu Persian: اسو
- Village
- Location within Iran
- Coordinates: 33°13′29″N 59°25′42″E
- Country: Iran
- Province: South Khorasan
- County: Birjand
- District: Central
- Rural District: Alqurat

Population (2016)
  - Total: 538
- Time zone: UTC+3:30 (IRST)

Asu (Persian: اسو) (Note: Also romanized as Asow’ and Āsū; also known as Asa) is a village in Alqurat Rural District of the Central District in Birjand County, South Khorasan province, Iran.

== Demographics ==
=== Population ===
At the time of the 2006 National Census, the village's population was 791 in 184 households. The following census in 2011 counted 591 people in 186 households. The 2016 census measured the population of the village as 538 people in 184 households.
