= Nughab Castle =

Castle in South Khorasan Province, Iran

Nughab castle
- قلعه نوغاب

General information
- Type: Castle
- Location: Birjand County, Iran

Nughab castle (Persian: قلعه نوغاب) is a historical castle located in Birjand County in South Khorasan Province; the longevity of this fortress dates back to the 12th to 14th centuries AH.
