= Kuh Shakhen Castle =

Castle in South Khorasan Province, Iran

Kuh Shakhen castle
- قلعه کوه شاخن

General information
- Type: Castle
- Location: Birjand County, Iran

Kuh Shakhen castle (Persian: قلعه کوه شاخن) is a historical castle located in Birjand County in South Khorasan Province; the longevity of this fortress dates back to the Seljuk Empire.
