= University of Birjand =

University in Birjand, Iran

Coordinates: 32°52′36″N 59°13′05″E

- دانشگاه بيرجند
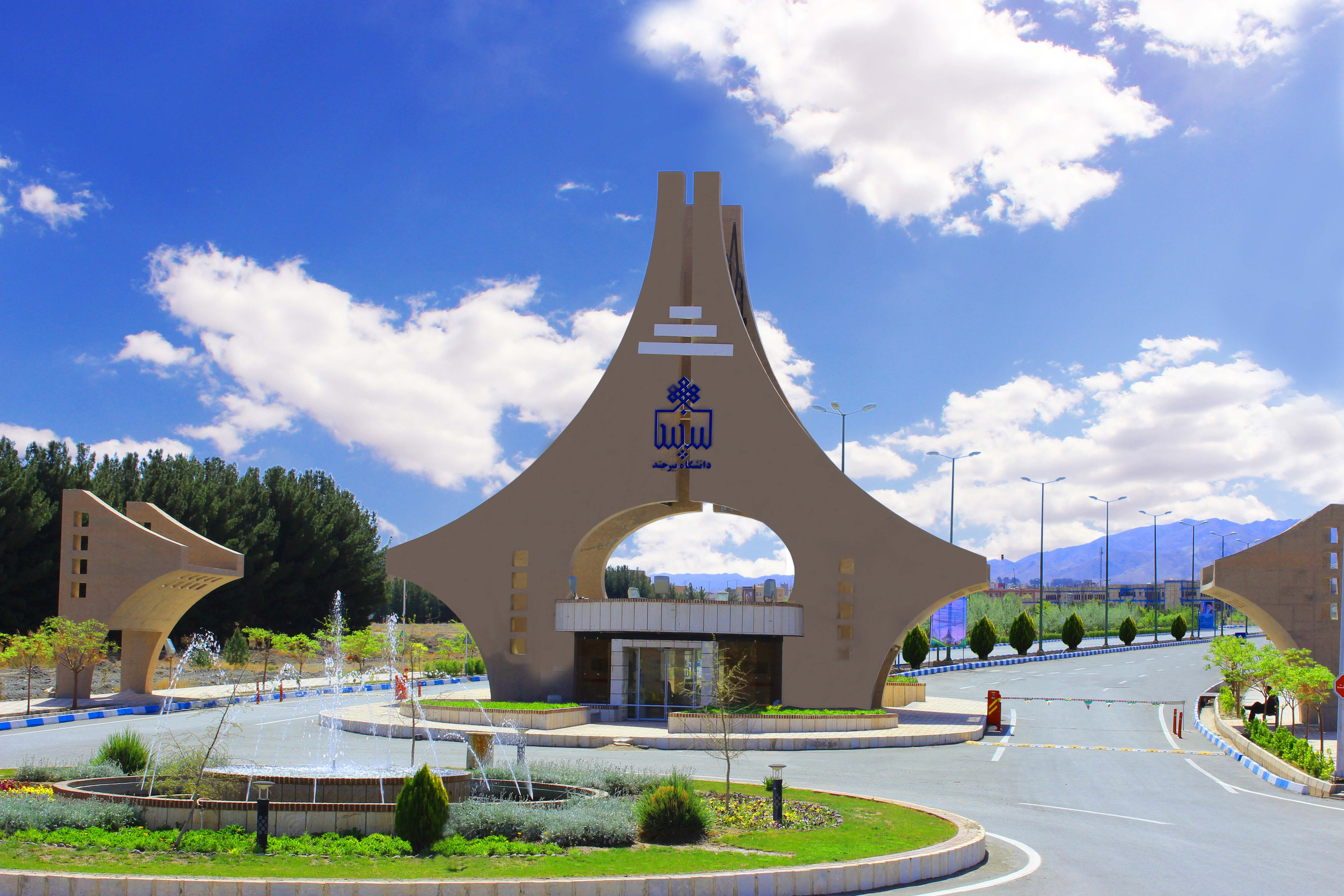
- Type: Public
- Established: 1975
- President: Dr. Ahmad Khamesan
- Students: 13,000
- Location: Birjand, South Khorasan Province, Iran
- Campus: Urban and Sub-urban
- Website: www.birjand.ac.ir

The University of Birjand (Persian: دانشگاه بیرجند) is a public research university located in Birjand, South Khorasan province. In 2018, the university was ranked 300–350 in Asia University Ranking and +1000 in World University Ranking by Times Higher Education. The University of Birjand also achieved a top ranking in the Times Higher Education Young University Rankings, 2019. It is also one of 33 Iranian universities listed in the Times Higher Education World University Rankings 2020 for Engineering and Technology. The university has a multilingual website (Persian, English, Pashto, Spanish, Arabic, French and Turkish).

== History ==
The University of Birjand was originally established in 1975. At its 102nd session, the Council for Higher Education Development approved the establishment of a higher education center in Birjand. In 1975, Professor Mohammad Hassan Ganji was appointed as the first president of the university.

The academic activities of the University of Birjand began in 1989 with the admission of students for an associate degree in electronics. Then three departments were established, namely mathematics, physics and chemistry. In 1991, the higher education institution was upgraded and renamed the University of Birjand. After the Islamic Revolution in Iran, the university cooperated with the Ministry of Science, Research and Technology to implement higher education programs in accordance with the principles set by the Cultural Revolution Committee for Universities. In the following years, academic faculties were established at the University of Birjand, including the Faculty of Engineering, the Faculty of Literature and Humanities, the Faculty of Agriculture, the Faculty of Arts, the Faculty of Psychology and Education, the Faculty of Electronics, Energy and Computer Sciences, and the Faculty of Physical Education and Sports Sciences.

== Current status ==
Currently, the University of Birjand comprises 14 faculties and colleges. It is now home to more than 12,000 students studying in more than 330 graduate and undergraduate programs with more than 360 full-time and many other part-time faculty. The university has an Innovation and Accelerating Center.

== University of Birjand in Times Higher Education World University Rankings ==
- Young University Rankings, 2019
- World University Rankings, 2020
- World University Rankings: Engineering and Technology, 2020
- World University Rankings: Physical Sciences, 2020

== Campuses ==
There are two main campuses that house almost all departments and offices. The Faculty of Agriculture and the Faculty of Natural Resources and Environmental Studies are located in Amirabad Site (Amirabad Campus, with a total area of 206 hectares and a total building area of 23,900 m^{2}) in the west of the city. The main campus is called Shokatabad (with a total area of 650 hectares and a total building area of 120,500 m^{2}), which houses all other faculties.

== See also ==
- Higher Education in Iran
- List of universities in Iran
