= Masen Castle =

Castle in South Khorasan Province, Iran

Masen castle
- قلعه ماسن

General information
- Type: Castle
- Location: Birjand County, Iran

Masen castle (Persian: قلعه ماسن) is a historical castle located in Birjand County in South Khorasan Province; the longevity of this fortress dates back to the Safavid dynasty and Qajar dynasty.
