= Darg =

Darg could refer to:

- Darg, Tajikistan, a village
- David Darg, American director and cinematographer

== See also ==
- Kalaj Darg, a village in South Khorasan Province, Iran
