= Howz Gholam Kesh Castle =

Castle in South Khorasan Province, Iran

- قلعه حوض غلام کش

General information
- Type: Castle
- Location: Birjand County, Iran

Howz Gholam Kesh Castle (Persian: قلعه حوض غلام کش) is a historical castle located in Birjand County in South Khorasan Province, The longevity of this fortress dates back to the 7th and 8th centuries AH.
