= Birjand University of Medical Sciences =

University of Medical Sciences

- دانشگاه علوم پزشکی و خدمات بهداشتی درمانی بيرجند; Danushgah-e 'lum-e Pezeshki-ye vâ Behedashti-ye Dârmati-ye Birjend
- Type: Public
- Established: 1985
- Academic staff: 231
- Students: 3,300
- Location: Birjand, South Khorasan Province, Iran
- Campus: Urban
- Website: www.bums.ac.ir

Birjand University of Medical Sciences and Health Services (BUMS) is located in the Islamic Republic of Iran. This university has now more than 3300 students.

== Schools & faculties ==
- School of Medicine
- School of Dentistry
- School of Nursing & Midwifery
- School of Allied Medicine
- School of Health

== Research Centers & Groups ==
- Cardiovascular Diseases Research Center
- Cellular and Molecular Research Center
- Infectious Diseases Research Center
- Social Determinants of Health Research Center
- Medical Toxicology and Drug Abuse Research Center
- Health Technology Incubator Center
- Asthma, Allergy and Immunology Research Center
- Research Centre of Experimental Medicine

== See also ==
- Higher Education in Iran
- List of universities in Iran
- List of hospitals in Iran
