= Islamic Azad University, Birjand Branch =

- دانشگاه آزاد اسلامی واحد بیرجند
- Type: Private
- Established: 1985
- Affiliations: Islamic Azad University
- President: Dr. Alireza Azizi
- Students: 7,500
- Location: Birjand, South Khorasan Province, Iran
- Campus: Urban
- Website: http://www.iaubir.ac.ir

The Islamic Azad University, Birjand Branch (Persian: دانشگاه آزاد اسلامی واحد بیرجند) is a university in Birjand, Iran. It was established in 1985, currently serving 8,500 students in five faculties and 90 fields.
