= Mahmoud Reza Eftekharzadeh =

Iranian writer, researcher and translator (1954–2021)

MahmoudReza Eftekharzadeh
- Born: 20 October 1954; Birjand, Imperial State of Iran
- Died: 22 August 2021 (aged 66); Tehran, Iran
- Occupations: Iranian Writer, Researcher & Translator

Mahmoud Reza Eftekharzadeh (Persian: محمودرضا افتخارزاده; born 20 October 1954 in Birjand – died 22 August 2021 in Tehran) was an Iranian writer, researcher and translator.

He wrote nearly 100 books, essays and articles about Iranology, Islamology & Iranian Mysticism. Some of them are textbooks. A lot of the works are translated from Arabic. He was a researcher in the history of Ancient Persia & Iran after Islam. His research in this area included: Iran; Religion & Culture, Islam & Iran; Religion & Nationality and Shoubiyyeh; The National Movement Resistance of Iran. He wrote more than 40 articles and critical studies about cultural, historical & civilizational background of Iran.

He was also an Islamologist and reader in the history of Islam. He believed that for Iranians, Islam cannot be segregated from Iranian culture and with the particular complexion it has, it is distinctly distinguishable from typical Arab way of life as is in vogue in Saudi Arabia, the U.A.E, Egypt, Syria and even the contiguous Iraq, hence his strong emphasis on Iranian Islam. In 1992 he wrote his Ph.D. (Doctor of philosophy in Islamic Shiite Studies) dissertation on: "Dissimulation in Imamite shiite from the first to the end of fifth century." At the same time he was accepted for (M.phil/ph.D) Degree in University of Manchester.

He translated original texts of Iranian Islamic mysticism such as: Al mavqef va Al mokhatabat (The legacy of The fourth century. by Al Neffari. 354 AD), Manarat al Saerin by Najm al Din al Razi (Iranian Sufi 654 AD), Al Reayeh le Hoquqellah by Hareth al Mahasebi (243 AD) and Tartib al Soluk by Abulqasem al Qoshayri (450AD).

== Bibliography ==
=== Iranology ===
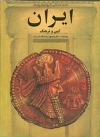
Iran: Religion & Culture

- Iran: Religion & Culture (The Avestaic Writing of the Iranian Ancient History) Tehran. 1998/1377
- Islam & Iran: Religion & Nationality (The New Writing History of the Islamic Iran) Tehran. 1998/1377.
- Shoubiyyah: Iranian Nationalism (The Critical Study of the Iranian National Historical Movements) Tehran. 1997/1376.
- Shoubiyeh: The National Movement Resistance of Iran. Tehran. 1371/1992.
- Iran During The Age of Omavied Rule (A political, Social & Economic Study) Persian Trans From Arabic. Tehran. 1998/1377.
- Ancient Norooz (The Iranian Festivals & Customs) Tehran. 2002/1382.
- Fazael e Norooz; The Virtues of Norooz in the Islamic-shiit literature. Tehran. 2006/1386.
- Shahnameh; The Iranian national identity. Tehran. 1997/1376.
- Rowzat Osh Shohada (Iran's heritage / The Persian prose of Tenth century) (Edit. 908.H.) Tehran. 2005/1384
- An Essay on the Retell of Shahnameh /on the Occasion of Ferdowsi's Birthday. In: Rudaky Monthly Magazine. No:15.1386/2008. Tehran.
- Iran During The Age of Pahlavi Kingdom (Scientific, Social & Cultural Situation) Persian Trans From Arabic. Tehran. 2015/1394.

=== Iranian Mysticism ===
- Baz Khani e Robaiyat e Omar e Khayyam (Rettel of Robaiyat) Tehran. October 2015/1394
- Bayzid. e. Bastami: From the Peak to the Ascention, Tehran, November 2017.
- Abolhasan. e. Kharaghani; Noor al Olum (the light of Knowledge) Tehran, November 2017

=== Translations by Eftekharzadeh ===
- Dr. Abd al Rahman Badawi Tarikh.e.Tasavof.e.Islami (History of Islamic Sufism). Persian Trans From Arabic. first Edition. 1995 / second Edition. 2011. Tehran.
- Mohammad ibn Abd Al Jabbar Al Neffari Al.mavaqef.va.Al.Mokhatabat Persian Trans From Arabic. Tehran. 2011/1390.
- Hareth al Mahasebi Al reayeh le hoquqe Allah. Persian Trans From Arabic. Tehran. 1390/2011.
- Najm al Din Al razi Manazel.al.saerin. Persian trans From Arabic. Tehran. 2011/1392.
- Abulqasem Al Qoshayri / Adab Al soluk. Persian trans from Arabic. Tehran. 1392/2013.
- Dr. Abraham al Desuqi Sheta Principles & historical evolution of IRANIAN MYSTICISM (Sufism in Iran) Trans from Arabic. Tehran, March 2016.

=== Islamology ===
- Translation & Introduction to Imam Ali (P.b.u.h) / Nahj Al Balaqah (The sermons, Letters & sayings of Imam Ali) Persian Trans From Arabic. Tehran. 2000/1379.
- Imam Ali ibn al Hosain (p.b.u.p.h) Dar Sayehsare e Sahifeh. Persian Trans From Arabic. Tehran. 1391/2013.
- Translation of and Introduction to; Allame Amini Alqadir fi Alketab va Alsonnat va Aladab (selection from: Al.Qadir In Qur'an, Traditions & Historical Literature of Islam) Persian Trans From Arabic. Tehran. 1382/2003.
- Translation of and Introduction to; Solym ibn Qays Ketabe Solaim (The Political History of Initial Islam) Persian Trans From Arabic. Tehran. 1998
- Julius Wellhausen (1844–1918 ); Die religiös-politischen Oppositionsparteien im alten Islam, In Abhhandlungen der kgl. Geselschaft der Wissenschaften in Göttingen - phil-hist. Klasse. N.F.5.1. Berlin 1901 I; Die chavarig. II;Die Schia. Persian Trans From Arabic & German. Tehran. 1994.
- Dr. M. Al Rafei Islam; The Human rights & freedom. Persian Trans From Arabic. Tehran. 1994.
- Dr. Al Desouqi The Orientalist Thinking (Its Evaluation and History) Persian Trans From Arabic. Tehran. 1997.
- Translation of Jacques Berque Relire Le Coran. Persian Trans From French. Iran. Tehran. 1379/2000.
- Translation of L. Massignon La Mubahala de Medine(et L'hyperdulie de Fatema) Persian Trans From Arabic & French. Tehran. 1999/1378.
- Dr. F. Dorayni The Fees of Authors, Translators, Artfuls and Publishers in the Islamic Contemporary Law. Persian Trans From Arabic. Tehran.1997/1376.Second Edition: 2015/1393.
- Prof. M. H. Salman The Principles and laws of the Key Money. Persian Trans From Arabic. Tehran. 1999.
- Translation and Introduction to Dr. A. Sachedina & Dr. J. Hussain The Occutation & Mahdiism In the Imamite, Shiite Doctrine. (The Doctrine of Mahdiism in Twelver Shiism as presented by Two contemporary Muslim Scholars) Department of Religious studies. University of Virginia. May 1983. Persian Trans From English. Tehran. First Edition: 1994 & Second: 2012.
- Translation of Atekeh Mousa/The Political rights of woman in Islam. Persian Trans From Arabic. Tehran.1999.Second Edition: In the book of: Eighth OIC Summit. Tehran. 1997.
- Translation of Foudamentalism & Reformism in Islamic World by Dr. A. Risuni & M. J. Barut. Persian Trans From Arabic. Tehran. 1393/2014.
- The Critical study of the Islamic shiite historical movements Mokhtare saqafi's movemt. Tehran. 1375/1995.
- The life of Sharaf Od Din Davoud Al Hasani (Imamzadeh Davoud) Tehran. 2010.
- The influence of the humanity view points on the legality views. Tehran. 1374/1995.
- The Literature of Ashura during the Time of Imams. (The International Congress on the Culture of Ashura) Tehran. 1374/1995.
- The portraitgraphy of Ashura. Tehran. Rudaky Monthly Magazine. 2006/1386.
- Dr. Javad Ali The history of prayer in Islam (Zoroastrianism, Judaism & Christianity) trans from Arabic. Tehran. March 2016.
- Biyaid in gouneh Bashim (Let's Be This way )Tehran.Nov.2017.
