= Chahkanduk, Sarbisheh =

Chahkanduk چهكندوك
- Village
- Location within Iran
- Coordinates: 32°33′13″N 59°27′48″E
- Country: Iran
- Province: South Khorasan
- County: Sarbisheh
- Bakhsh: Mud
- Rural District: Naharjan

Population (2006)
  - Total: 66
- Time zone: UTC+3:30 (IRST)
  - Summer (DST): UTC+4:30 (IRDT)

Chahkanduk (Persian: چهكندوك, also Romanized as Chāhkandūk and Chāh Kandūk; also known as Chah Kandook Nahar Khan) is a village in Naharjan Rural District, Mud District, Sarbisheh County, South Khorasan Province, Iran. According to the 2006 census, it had a population of 66 in 32 families.
