= Chahar Deh, Khuzestan =

Chahar Deh چهارده
- Village
- Location within Iran
- Coordinates: 31°47′14″N 50°03′42″E
- Country: Iran
- Province: Khuzestan
- County: Izeh
- Bakhsh: Dehdez
- Rural District: Donbaleh Rud-e Shomali

Population (2006)
  - Total: 200
- Time zone: UTC+3:30 (IRST)
  - Summer (DST): UTC+4:30 (IRDT)

Chahar Deh (Persian: چهارده, also Romanized as Chahār Deh) is a village in Donbaleh Rud-e Shomali Rural District, Dehdez District, Izeh County, Khuzestan Province, Iran. At the 2006 census, its population was 200, in 33 families.
