= Chahar Deh, Fars =

Chahar Deh چهارده
- Village
- Location within Iran
- Coordinates: 28°28′33″N 55°02′27″E
- Country: Iran
- Province: Fars
- County: Darab
- Bakhsh: Rostaq
- Rural District: Rostaq

Population (2006)
  - Total: 225
- Time zone: UTC+3:30 (IRST)
  - Summer (DST): UTC+4:30 (IRDT)

Chahar Deh (Persian: چهارده, also Romanized as Chahār Deh and Chehārdeh; also known as Chahar Dāng) is a village in Rostaq Rural District, Rostaq District, Darab County, Fars province, Iran. At the 2006 census, its population was 225,[54 families].
