= Chahkand-e Mud =

Chahkand-e Mud چهكندمود
- Village
- Location within Iran
- Coordinates: 32°40′45″N 59°31′08″E
- Country: Iran
- Province: South Khorasan
- County: Sarbisheh
- Bakhsh: Mud
- Rural District: Mud

Population (2006)
  - Total: 176
- Time zone: UTC+3:30 (IRST)
  - Summer (DST): UTC+4:30 (IRDT)

Chahkand-e Mud (Persian: چهكندمود, also Romanized as Chahkand-e Mūd; also known as Chah Kand) is a village in Mud Rural District, Mud District, Sarbisheh County, South Khorasan Province, Iran. According to the 2006 census, it had a population of 176 in 61 families.
