= Göyük =

Göyük or Köyük or Gëyuk or Keyuk may refer to:

- Göyük, Aghjabadi, Azerbaijan
- Köyük, Yevlakh, Azerbaijan

== See also ==
- Givak (disambiguation)
