= Birjand =

City in South Khorasan province, Iran

Birjand Persian: بیرجند
- City
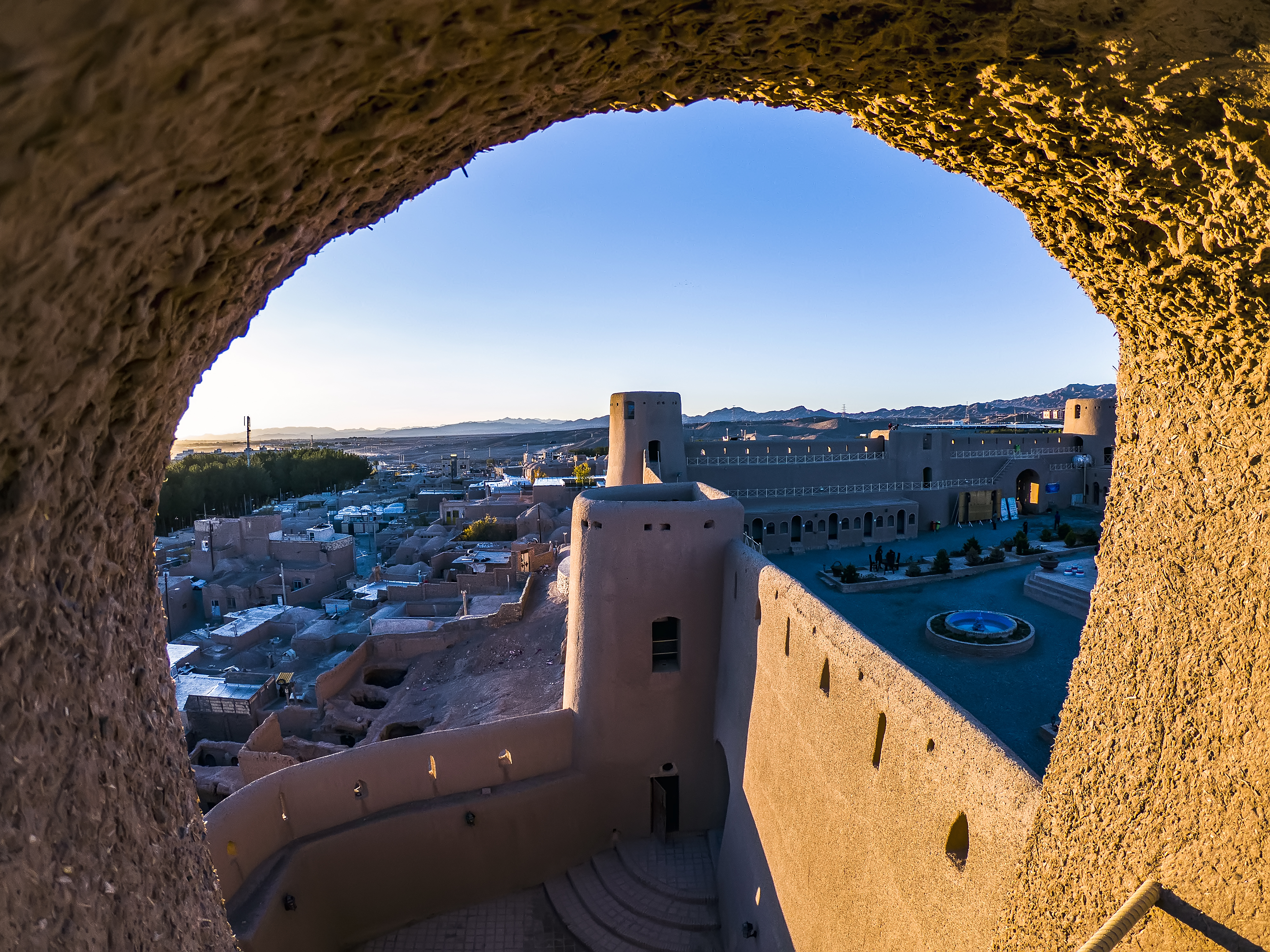
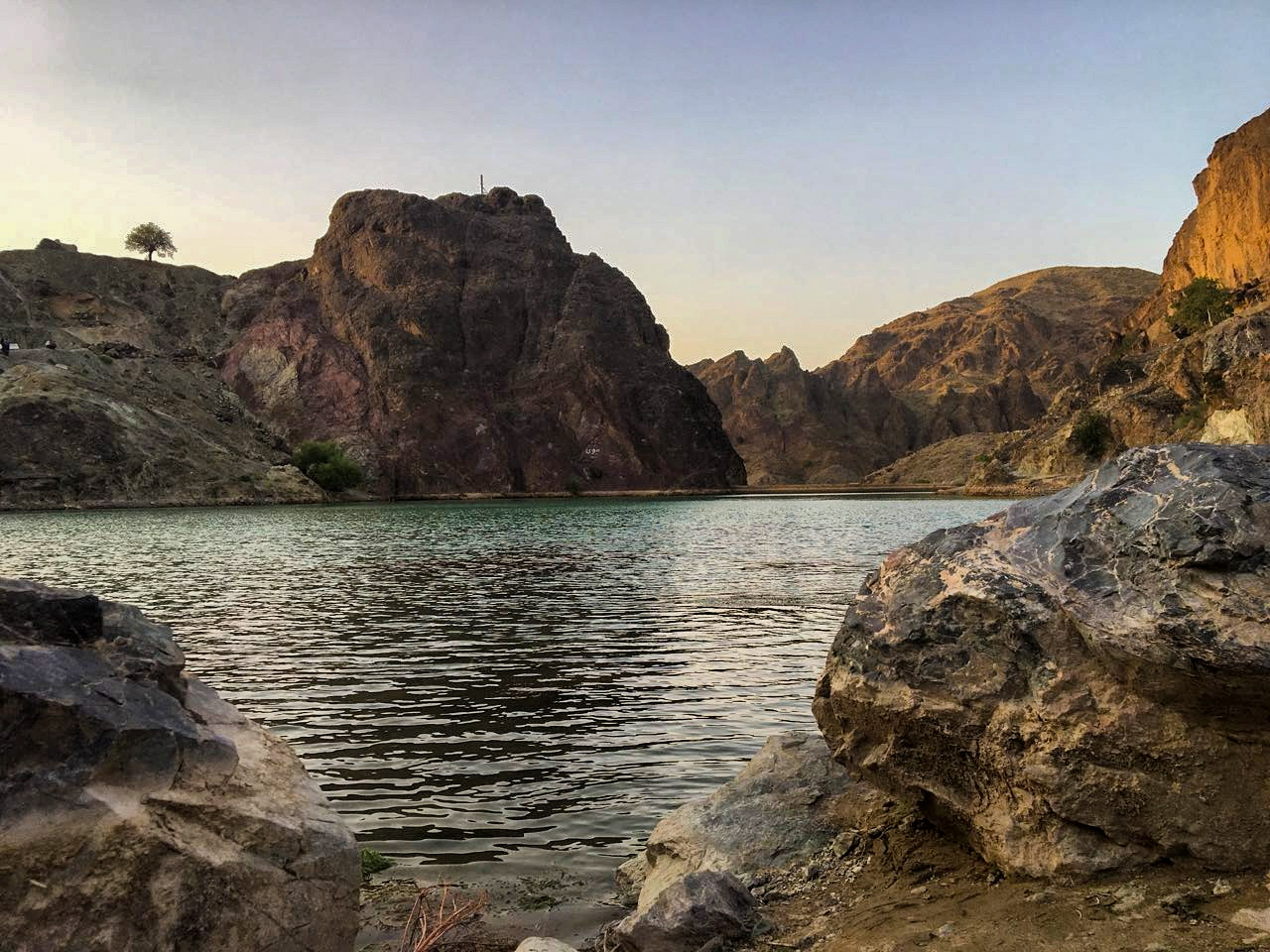
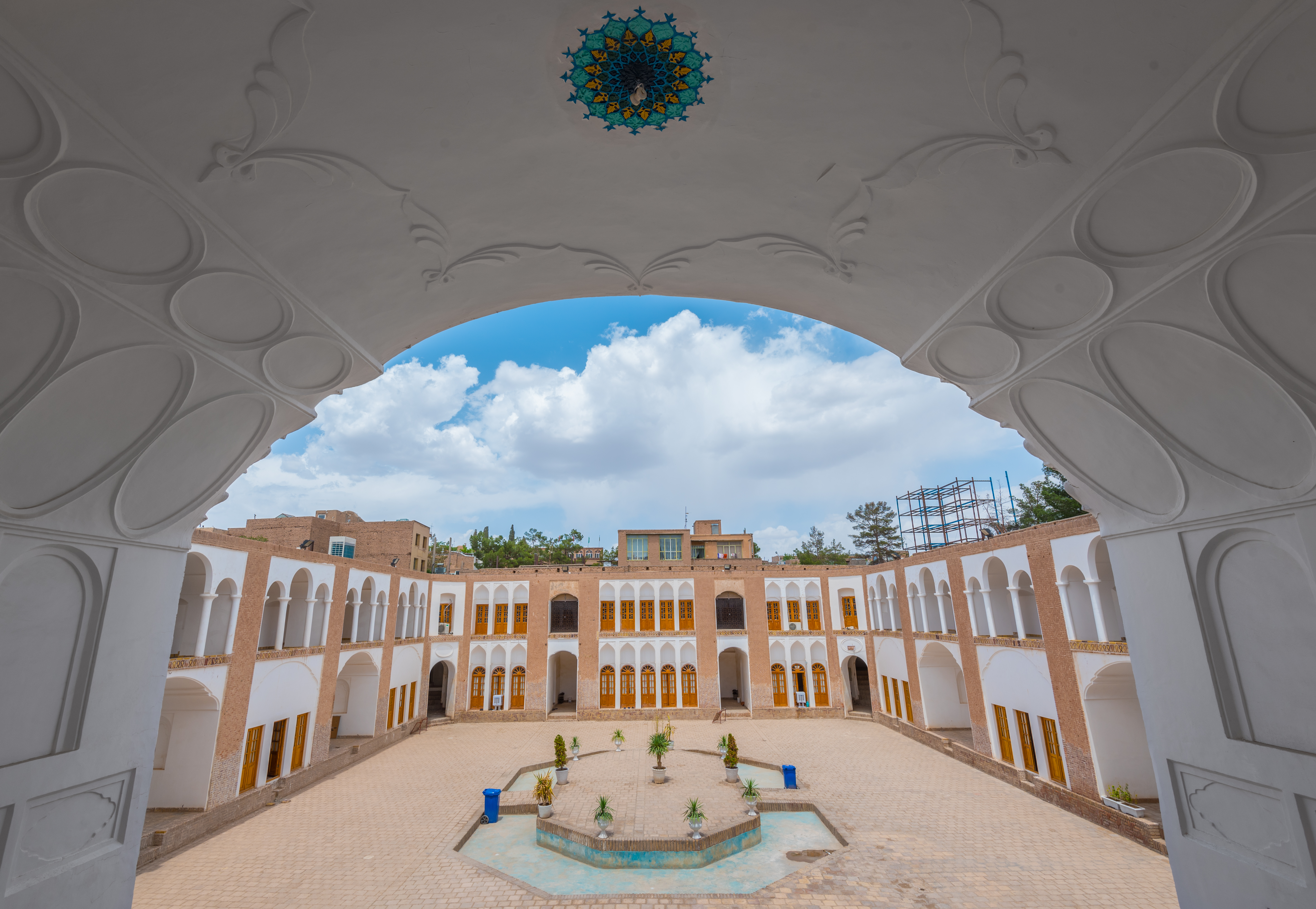
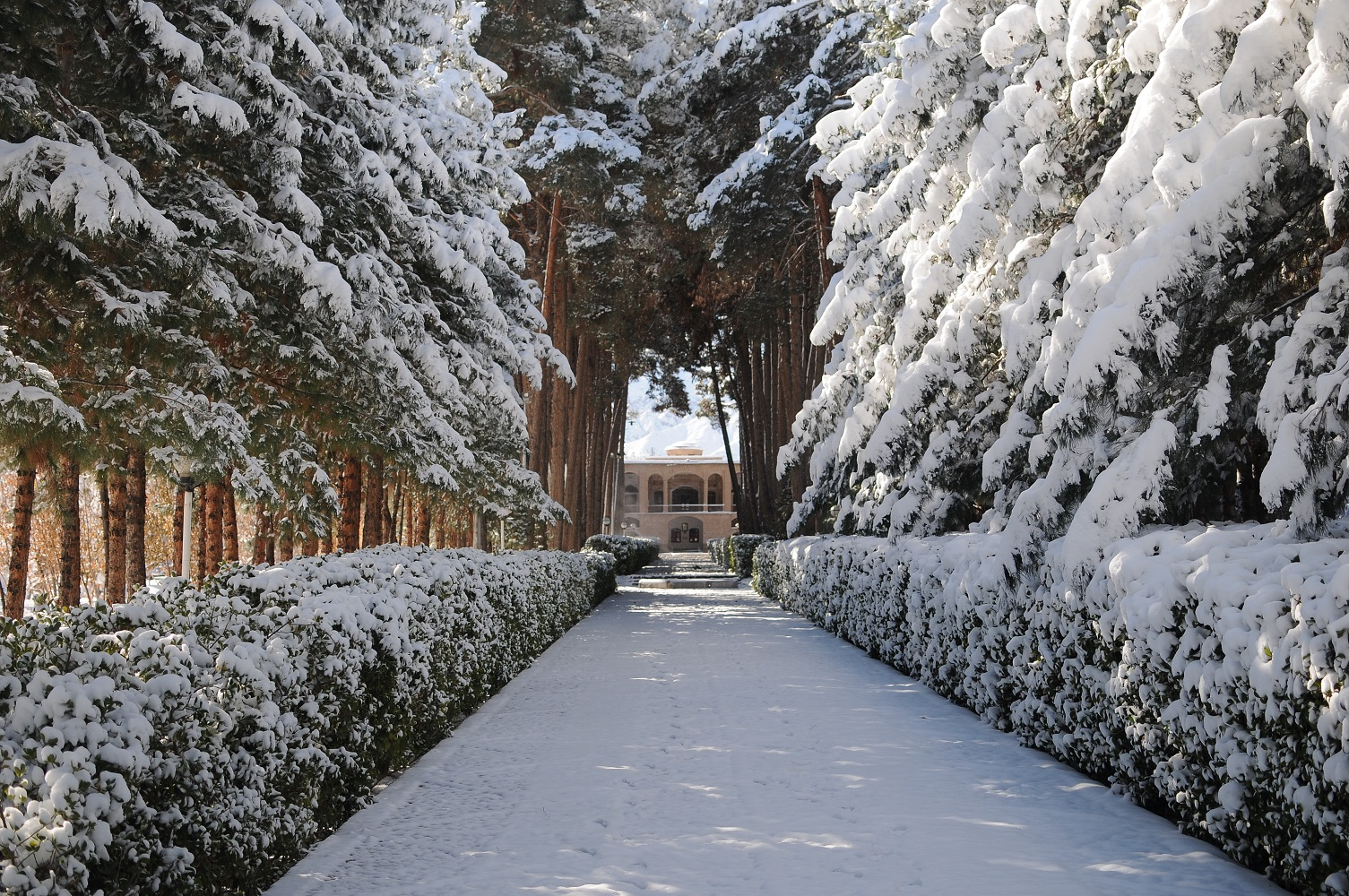
- Birjand Castle, Dande Barre, Shokatiyeh School, Akbarieh Garden
- Nicknames: City of Pines, City of Culture
- Location within Iran
- Coordinates: 32°52′41″N 59°12′58″E
- Country: Iran
- Province: South Khorasan
- County: Birjand
- District: Central
- First mention: 13th century

Government
  - Mayor: Mehdi Behtarin
- Elevation: 1,491 m (4,892 ft)

Population (2016)
  - Total: 203,636
  - Density: 3,697/km^{2} (9,580/sq mi)
- Time zone: UTC+3:30 (IRST)
- Area code: (+98) 56
- Climate: BSk
- Website: www.birjand.ir/
- Prefix code: +98 Iran – (0)56 Birjand

Birjand (Persian: بیرجند; [biːɾˈdʒæːnd]) (Note: Also romanized as Birdjand and Bīrjand) is a city in the Central District of Birjand County, South Khorasan province, Iran, serving as capital of the province, the county, and the district. The city is known for its saffron, barberry, jujube, and handmade carpet exports.

== History ==
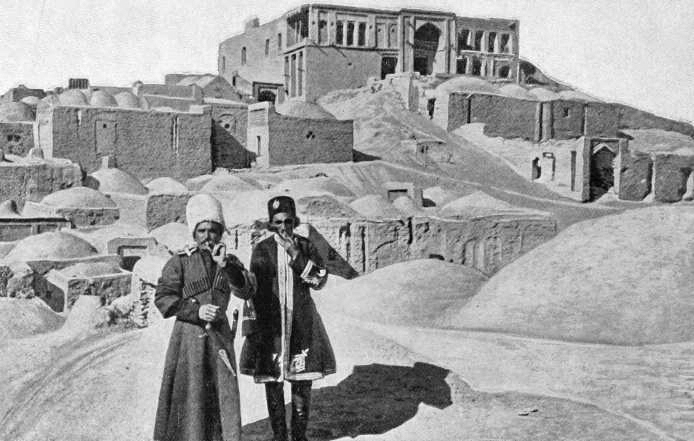
Cossacks in Birjand, circa 1909.

The first citation of the city in the historical literature belongs to the famous book Mojem Alboldan, by Yaqut Homavi (13th century) which introduces the Birjand as the most beautiful town in the Qohestan. Before this, Birjand had probably not been as big and important as a municipality but rather as a rural community. However, the Birjand geographical area had its historical and political importance long before the emergence of the city of Birjand. Many citations of the region are available in the original literature like Ehya al-Molook of the once important localities in the area. Apart from literature, the oldest evidence of the history of the region is the ancient Lakh-Mazar inscription in the Kooch village some 25 km (16 mi) southeast of Birjand. Numerous fine drawings and inscriptions are carved on an igneous rock surface. The inscriptions include pictograms as well as Arsacid Pahlavi, Sasanian Pahlavi, Arabic, and Persian scripts.

In 1931, Birjand Municipality was opened next to the tomb of Hakim Nazari and started its activities with 12 employees. The first mayor of Birjand was Mr. Afshar, who served as mayor for six years.

== Demographics ==
=== Population ===
Population history
Year	Pop.	±%
1956	13,934	—
1966	25,845	+85.5%
1976	46,943	+81.6%
1986	81,798	+74.2%
1991	101,177	+23.7%
1996	127,608	+26.1%
2006	157,848	+23.7%
2011	178,020	+12.8%
2016	203,636	+14.4%

At the time of the 2006 National Census, the city's population was 157,848 in 41,341 households. The following census in 2011 counted 178,020 people in 48,130 households. The 2016 census measured the population of the city as 203,636 people in 57,745 households.

==== Religion ====
The people of Birjand follow (Shia) Islam.

== Climate ==
Birjand has a cool arid climate (Köppen BWk) bordering upon a cool semi-arid climate (BSk) with hot to sweltering summers, cool winters and a significant difference between day and night temperatures. Precipitation falls mostly in winter and spring.

Climate data for Birjand (1991–2020)
Month	Jan	Feb	Mar	Apr	May	Jun	Jul	Aug	Sep	Oct	Nov	Dec	Year
Record high °C (°F)	25.0 (77.0)	27.6 (81.7)	32.8 (91.0)	36.0 (96.8)	40.6 (105.1)	43.0 (109.4)	44.0 (111.2)	44.1 (111.4)	40.0 (104.0)	36.0 (96.8)	30.1 (86.2)	27.0 (80.6)	44.1 (111.4)
Mean daily maximum °C (°F)	11.4 (52.5)	14.0 (57.2)	18.9 (66.0)	25.1 (77.2)	30.7 (87.3)	35.1 (95.2)	35.8 (96.4)	34.4 (93.9)	31.8 (89.2)	26.5 (79.7)	19.2 (66.6)	14.2 (57.6)	24.8 (76.6)
Daily mean °C (°F)	3.9 (39.0)	6.6 (43.9)	11.6 (52.9)	17.6 (63.7)	22.9 (73.2)	27.3 (81.1)	28.3 (82.9)	26.3 (79.3)	22.5 (72.5)	17.0 (62.6)	10.4 (50.7)	5.7 (42.3)	16.7 (62.1)
Mean daily minimum °C (°F)	−2.6 (27.3)	0.2 (32.4)	4.6 (40.3)	10.0 (50.0)	14.2 (57.6)	18.2 (64.8)	19.9 (67.8)	17.1 (62.8)	12.4 (54.3)	7.5 (45.5)	2.6 (36.7)	−1.3 (29.7)	8.6 (47.5)
Record low °C (°F)	−21.5 (−6.7)	−17.6 (0.3)	−12 (10)	−4.5 (23.9)	0.0 (32.0)	7.0 (44.6)	10.2 (50.4)	6.0 (42.8)	1.0 (33.8)	−5.6 (21.9)	−11.5 (11.3)	−15.8 (3.6)	−21.5 (−6.7)
Average precipitation mm (inches)	26.2 (1.03)	30.8 (1.21)	35.5 (1.40)	20.6 (0.81)	7.0 (0.28)	0.5 (0.02)	0.1 (0.00)	1.0 (0.04)	0.5 (0.02)	2.9 (0.11)	7.7 (0.30)	17.4 (0.69)	150.2 (5.91)
Average precipitation days (≥ 1 mm)	4.4	4.7	5.4	4.1	1.4	0.2	0.0	0.1	0.2	0.6	1.6	3.1	25.8
Average relative humidity (%)	56.0	51.0	44.0	35.0	26.0	19.0	20.0	20.0	20.0	27.0	40.0	49.0	33.9
Average dew point °C (°F)	−7.5 (18.5)	−6.3 (20.7)	−4.5 (23.9)	−2.2 (28.0)	−1.8 (28.8)	−2.1 (28.2)	−0.6 (30.9)	−2.4 (27.7)	−5.5 (22.1)	−6.0 (21.2)	−6.5 (20.3)	−7.7 (18.1)	−4.4 (24.1)
Mean monthly sunshine hours	208	204	229	252	313	349	373	364	324	293	232	217	3,358
Source 1: NOAA
Source 2: (records)

Climate data for Birjand (1955–2010)
Month	Jan	Feb	Mar	Apr	May	Jun	Jul	Aug	Sep	Oct	Nov	Dec	Year
Record high °C (°F)	25.0 (77.0)	27.0 (80.6)	32.0 (89.6)	36.0 (96.8)	40.6 (105.1)	43.0 (109.4)	44.0 (111.2)	44.1 (111.4)	40.0 (104.0)	36.0 (96.8)	30.1 (86.2)	27.0 (80.6)	44.1 (111.4)
Mean daily maximum °C (°F)	11.0 (51.8)	13.5 (56.3)	18.7 (65.7)	24.8 (76.6)	30.5 (86.9)	35.0 (95.0)	35.8 (96.4)	34.5 (94.1)	31.8 (89.2)	26.6 (79.9)	19.6 (67.3)	13.6 (56.5)	24.6 (76.3)
Daily mean °C (°F)	4.3 (39.7)	6.7 (44.1)	11.6 (52.9)	17.2 (63.0)	22.2 (72.0)	26.4 (79.5)	27.8 (82.0)	25.8 (78.4)	22.0 (71.6)	16.9 (62.4)	10.9 (51.6)	6.2 (43.2)	16.5 (61.7)
Mean daily minimum °C (°F)	−2.3 (27.9)	-0 (32)	4.5 (40.1)	9.7 (49.5)	13.8 (56.8)	17.9 (64.2)	19.8 (67.6)	17.1 (62.8)	12.3 (54.1)	7.2 (45.0)	2.2 (36.0)	−1.1 (30.0)	8.4 (47.2)
Record low °C (°F)	−21.5 (−6.7)	−17.6 (0.3)	−12 (10)	−4.5 (23.9)	0.0 (32.0)	7.0 (44.6)	10.2 (50.4)	6.0 (42.8)	1.0 (33.8)	−5.6 (21.9)	−11 (12)	−15.8 (3.6)	−21.5 (−6.7)
Average precipitation mm (inches)	31.3 (1.23)	32.4 (1.28)	35.1 (1.38)	31.6 (1.24)	7.1 (0.28)	0.3 (0.01)	0.1 (0.00)	0.2 (0.01)	0.0 (0.0)	2.6 (0.10)	8.4 (0.33)	19.7 (0.78)	168.8 (6.64)
Average rainy days	7.9	8.3	9.2	8.0	3.6	0.7	0.4	0.2	0.3	1.6	3.3	6.3	49.8
Average snowy days	2.6	1.7	0.3	0.2	0	0	0	0	0	0	0.1	1.1	6
Average relative humidity (%)	57	55	46	38	27	21	21	22	22	28	39	52	36
Mean monthly sunshine hours	196.3	188.3	211.4	231.8	303.4	334.8	347.2	349.3	298.2	286.0	229.6	195.8	3,172.1
Source 1: NOAA (1961–1990)(precipitation, humidity, sunshine hours)
Source 2: (records, temperature normals)

== Transportation ==
=== Airport ===
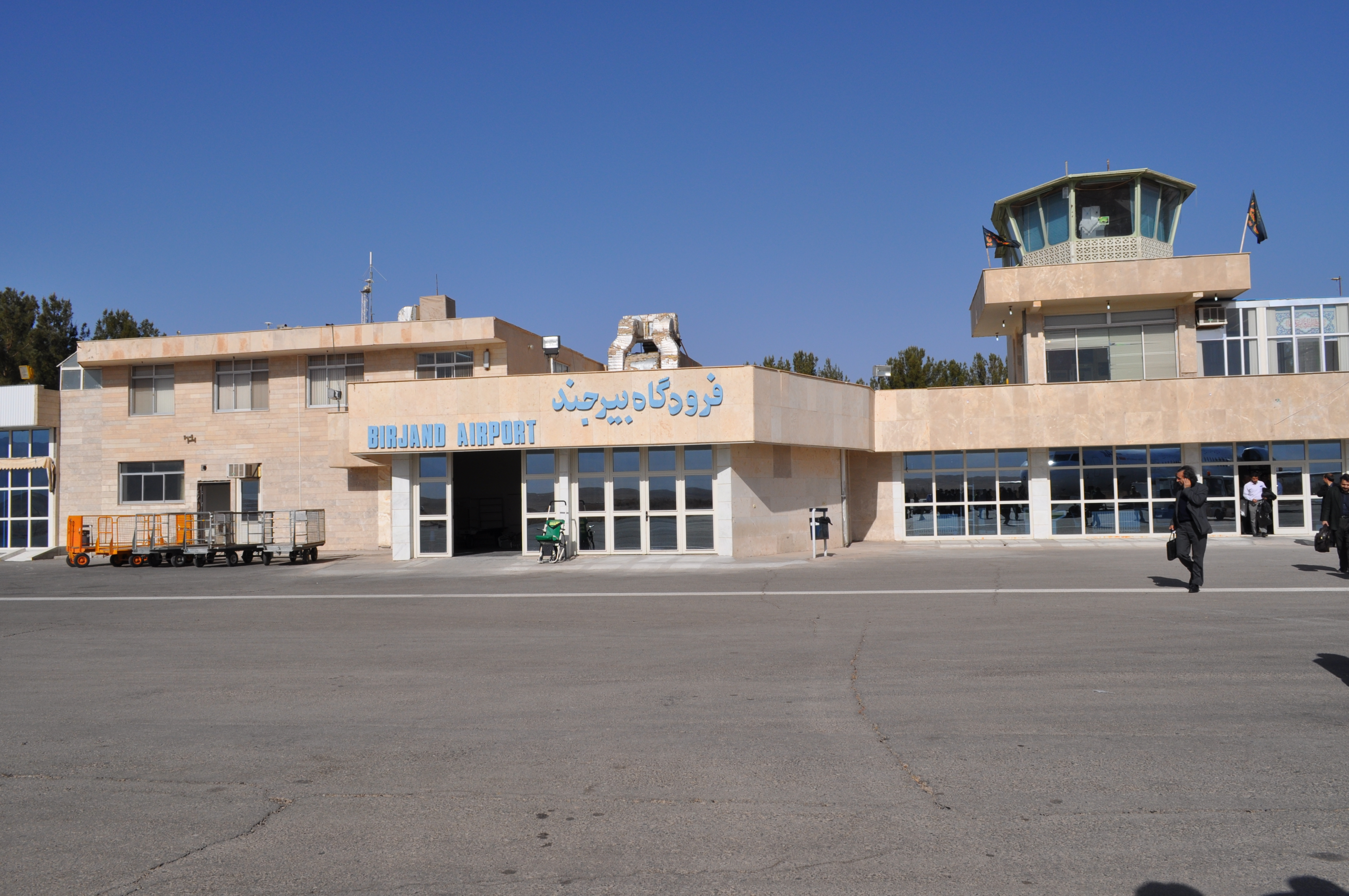
Birjand-airport

In 1933, due to the political and military situation of Birjand city and the east of the country, Birjand airport was established on a 150-hectare area in the north of the city.

=== Customs ===
In 1938, in order to facilitate the transportation, export and import of goods to the subcontinent of India and Afghanistan, the Birjand Customs Office was established and started its activities with two customs units, Dareh and Gezik.

== Health ==
=== Imam Reza Hospital ===
In 1948, Imam Reza Hospital was established in one of the lands and endowments belonging to the Alam family, known as Bagh-e Anari. In addition to accepting patients in Birjand city, this hospital also accepted patients from other southern cities of Khorasan province.

== Education ==
It is said that the Shokatiyeh School in Birjand together with Darolfonoon in Tehran were the first modern public schools of higher education in Iran in the mid-19th century. Ever since then, Birjand has amassed an abundance of institutions of higher education and become an important location for research and development.

=== Universities ===
In 1975, following Dr. Mohammad Hassan Ganji, the Birjand Institute of Higher Education was established in the Assadollah Alam Endowment Collection. This university started with the admission of 120 students in the fields of mathematics, physics and chemistry and is now officially known as Birjand University.

The city contains such universities and academic institutions as:

- University of Birjand
- Birjand University of Technology
- Birjand University of Medical Sciences
- Payame Noor University
- Islamic Azad University of Birjand
- University of Applied Science and Technology (south khorasan branch)
- Academy of Tarbiat-e Moalem
- Academy of Amuzesh-e Aly
- Academy of Amuzesh-e Modiriat Dolaty

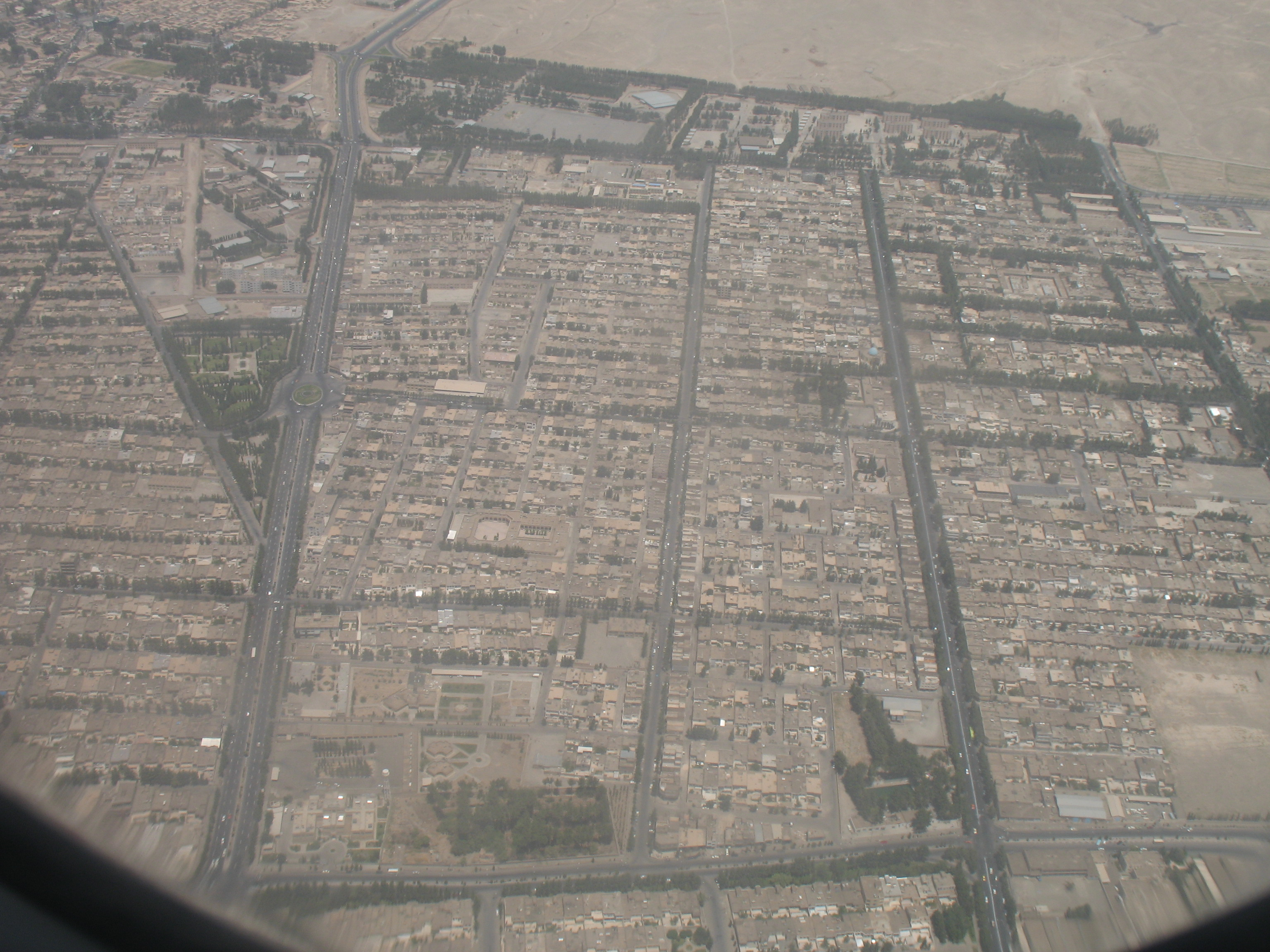
Aerial view of Birjand, 2006

== Notable people ==
- Abd al-Ali al-Birjandi, 16th century astronomer
- Hakim Nezari Quhestani
- Ibn Hessam Khusfi
- Amir Shokat Ul-Molk Alam, Amir of Qaen County and Governor of Quhestan at the end of Qajar dynasty
- Amir Ali Khan Sheibany, PhD, founder and first CEO of Zob Ahan Esfahan (Esfahan Steel Company)
- Seyyed Mohammad Tadayyon
- Asadollah Alam, prime minister of Iran during Pahlavi dynasty
- Seyyed Gholam Reza Saeidi, writer
- Mohamad Haghgou, composer
- Sima Bina, Iranian folk music singer
- Ahmad Kamyabi Mask, writer and renowned theater scholar
- Mohammad Hassan Ganji, geographer
- Mohammad Ismail Rezvani, historian
- Mohammad Reza Hafeznia
- Gholam Hossein Shokouei

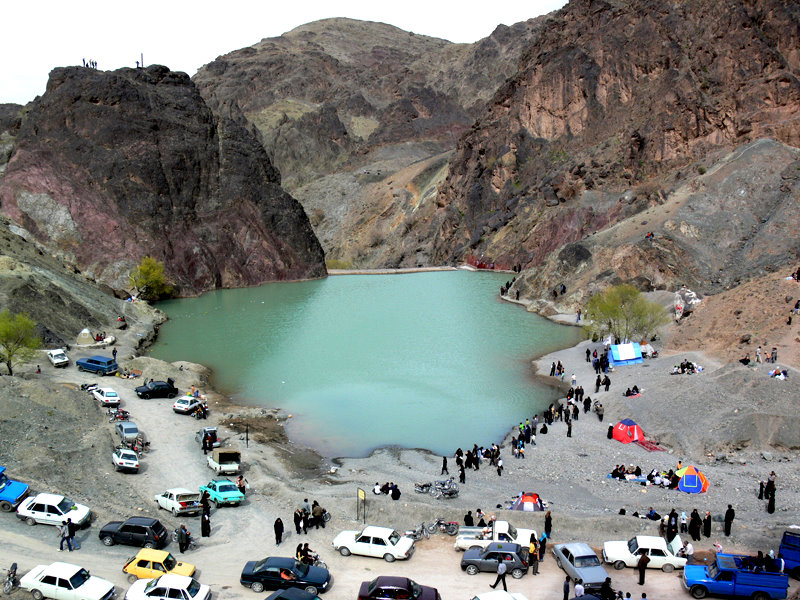
Band Darreh, 5km South of Birjand

- Kazem Motamadnejad
- Shah Seyyed Ali Kazemi, Last tribal leader in Moud and Birjand at the beginning of Pahlavi dynasty
- Mohammad Hossain Ayati
- Mohammad Ibrahim Ayati
- Seyyed Hassan Tahami
- Ardalan Shoja Kaveh, actor
- Mahmoud Reza Eftekharzadeh, writer

== See also ==
- Akbarieh Garden
- Furg citadel
- Khorashad
- Mahmuei
- Mud

Media related to Birjand at Wikimedia Commons
