= Mohammad-Reza Hafeznia =

Iranian geopolitician (b. 1955)

- Born: Mohammad Reza Hafeznia; 3 September 1955; Birjand, Imperial State of Iran
- Education: Tarbiat Modares University; Kharazmi University
- Known for: Political Geography of Iran
- Awards: Academic Book Award
- Scientific career
- Fields: Political Geography, Geopolitics
- Workplaces: Tarbiat Modares University

Mohammad Reza Hafeznia (Persian: محمدرضا حافظ‌نیا; born 1955, Birjand, Iran) is a full professor of political geography in Tarbiat Modares University, Tehran. He obtained his Ph.D. in political geography from Tarbiat Modares University in 1990.

His book entitled: "Political Geography of Iran" has been selected as the Best Iranian Academic Book in 2003. It has been also praised in the 21st Book of the Year Award of Iran in 2003.

Hafeznia is the founder of Iranian Association of Geopolitics (IAG) as well as the journal of Geopolitics Quarterly.

Hafeznia has presented a new definition about geopolitics to the 30th international conference of IGU, and published his book entitled: "Principles and Concepts of Geopolitics" in 2006 with a scientific approach. He has presented some theories, concepts and models in this book. (The book is in Persian language)

Hafeznia has presented some theories, such as: One world with two systems; The world state on the basis of international democracy; Theory of Asian Unity (in 1991); Direct democracy with using IT (suggestion an alternative model for legislation and policy-making in the structure of political systems, instead of parliaments); Political geography of cyber space; Dinamic relations of space, society and politics; Geographical philosophy of state & government; Geographical explanation of democracy and citizenship; A new concept of the Heartland; Humanist Geopolitics.

Hafeznia in collaboration with his colleagues has presented a model for measurement of national power which published in 2008 (Journal of applied sciences, Vol.8, N0.2).

His newest book entitled: "National Power and Interests" published in 2008. Hafeznia has a critical view and approach toward some basic and traditional concepts, such as: politics, process of democracy and legislation, nation, nation state, boundary and so on.

Hafeznia, has a humanitarian thought, and follows the idea of peace, justice, welfare, freedom and development for the humankind.

He believes that humankind throughout the world, as well as the earth as the living space for the people, have no good situation, while they can be and must be better. He thinks that, political activists and leaders, religious activists and leaders and economic activists and managers are responsible for pains of the Humankind as well as demolition of the Nature.

== Publications ==
He has published 27 books on the subject (24 in Persian and 3 in English), as well as more than 120 papers in the journals and conference proceedings.

- Political Geography of Iran, 2002. ISBN 978-964-530-889-4
- Hafeznia, Mohammad Reza; Meysam, Hadipour (2018). "Determining the Behavioral Pattern of Security Reinforcement in the Islamic Republic of Iran by VIKOR Model". Afarand Scholarly Publishing Institute. 33 (3): 8–23. doi:10.29252/geores.33.3.8. ISSN 1019-7052. S2CID 149925144. doi:10.29252/geores.33.3.8
- Mohammad, Reza Hafeznia; Mohammad, Taghi Bazgard; Seyed, Masoud Mousavi Shafaee; Elaheh, Koulaei (2019). "Geopolitical Factors of Conflict between the Superpowers during Post-Cold War Era". تحقيقات جغرافيايی. 34 (4): 471–482. doi:10.29252/geores.34.4.471. ISSN 1019-7052. S2CID 214389801.
- Principles of the School of Humanist Geopolitics (A New Approach and way to the Political and Moral Life of Humankind), 2021 (first published in 2014)
- Comparative study of Iran’s maritime realms in Persian Gulf and Oman Sea with the convention of the International Law of the Sea, 2016 (Co-authored with Reza Allahverdizadeh)
- The Impact of Geopolitical Interests of Iran and Saudi Arabia on Regional Challenges in Southwest Asia, 2017 (Co-authored with Ebrahim Roumina) doi:10.18869/acadpub.geores.32.2.9
- GEOPOLITICAL CHALLENGES OF CONVERGENCE IN ISLAMIC WORLD, 2012 (Co-authored with S H Zarghani)
- Transformation Pattern in the political Transition Period of the Revolutions Case Study: Islamic Revolution of Iran, 2008 (Contributing author)
- Hafeznia, Mohammad Reza; Kavandikateb, Albofazi (2021). "Expounding the Relation between Rapid Urbanization and Economic Ideology of the State in Political Management of National Space". Spatial Planning. 24 (4): 117–151.
- Hafeznia, Mohammad Reza; Ghaderi, Hajat Mostafa (2018). "Strategies for Achieving Spatial/Geographic Justice in Iran". 3 (1): 25–27.
- Hafeznia, Mohammad Reza (2020). "Capabilities and valences in the Islamic world". Fundamental and Applied Studies of the Islamic World. 2 (1): 115–145.
