= Mohammad Hassan Ganji =

Iranian meteorologist (1912–2012)

Mohammad Hassan Ganji محمدحسن گنجی
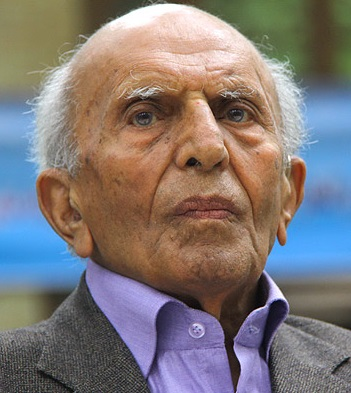
- Mohammad Hassan Ganji (2011)
- Born: 11 June 1912; Birjand, Sublime State of Iran
- Died: 19 July 2012 (aged 100); Tehran, Iran
- Resting place: Ganji Park
- Education: Tarbiat Moallem University; Victoria University of Manchester; Clark University
- Awards: 2001 IMO Prize
- Scientific career
- Fields: Meteorology
- Workplaces: University of Tehran
- Doctoral advisor: Samuel van Valkenburg
- Other academic advisors: Herbert John Fleure
- Notable students: Pirouz Mojtahedzadeh

Mohammad Hassan Ganji, Ph.D. (Persian: محمدحسن گنجی; 11 June 1912 – 19 July 2012) was an Iranian meteorologist and academic. He was born in Birjand. He is credited as being the father of modern geography in Iran.

== Education ==
He completed his studies in Tehran and continued to study geography in England and the United States. He next began to teach at the University of Tehran and was the first who began to teach modern geography at universities. Ganji established the Iran Meteorological Organization in 1955 and ran the organization for several years. He is often acknowledged as the father of modern geography in Iran.

== Career ==
Ganji established the Iran Meteorological Organization in 1955 and served as the head of Iran's Department General of Meteorology from 1956 to 1968.

== Awards ==
1. Winner of the International Meteorological Organization (IMO) Prize 2001 Professor M. H. Ganji (Iran)

== Works ==
He has written over 130 articles in Persian and English and has trained many scholars and masters of geography over the years. He is considered to be the father of modern geography in Iran. one of the work he had shared his knowledge was atlas and book Documents on the Persian Gulf's name.

== See also ==
- Birjand
- Persian Gulf
