= Fasharud Rural District =

Rural district in South Khorasan province, Iran

Fasharud Rural District Persian: دهستان فشارود
- Rural District
- Location within Iran
- Coordinates: 33°09′N 58°59′E
- Country: Iran
- Province: South Khorasan
- County: Birjand
- District: Central
- Established: 1987
- Capital: Kondor

Population (2016)
  - Total: 2,435
- Time zone: UTC+3:30 (IRST)

Fasharud Rural District (Persian: دهستان فشارود) is in the Central District of Birjand County, South Khorasan province, Iran. Its capital is the village of Kondor.

== Demographics ==
=== Population ===
At the time of the 2006 National Census, the rural district's population was 2,727 in 871 households. There were 2,124 inhabitants in 782 households at the following census of 2011. The 2016 census measured the population of the rural district as 2,435 in 884 households. The most populous of its 33 villages was Shushud, with 460 people.

=== Other villages in the rural district ===
- Afkasht
- Afzalabad
- Hajj Naj
- Hambal
- Hesar-e Sangi
- Rowshanavand
- Taj Kuh
