= Alqurat Rural District =

Rural district in South Khorasan province, Iran

Alqurat Rural District Persian: دهستان القورات
- Rural District
- Location within Iran
- Coordinates: 33°05′N 59°21′E
- Country: Iran
- Province: South Khorasan
- County: Birjand
- District: Central
- Established: 1987
- Capital: Hajjiabad

Population (2016)
  - Total: 9,479
- Time zone: UTC+3:30 (IRST)

Alqurat Rural District (Persian: دهستان القورات) is in the Central District of Birjand County, South Khorasan province, Iran. Its capital is the village of Hajjiabad.

== Demographics ==
=== Population ===
At the time of the 2006 National Census, the rural district's population was 8,236 in 2,546 households. There were 12,026 inhabitants in 3,876 households at the following census of 2011. The 2016 census measured the population of the rural district as 9,479 in 3,159 households. The most populous of its 71 villages was Dastgerd, with 3,365 people.

=== Other villages in the rural district ===
- Asu
- Kalateh-ye Bojdi
- Khong
- Mazdab
- Naqenj
- Shekaraneh
