= Kahshang Rural District =

Rural district in South Khorasan province, Iran

Kahshang Rural District Persian: دهستان كاهشنگ
- Rural District
- Location within Iran
- Coordinates: 33°00′N 59°29′E
- Country: Iran
- Province: South Khorasan
- County: Birjand
- District: Central
- Established: 1987
- Capital: Marak

Population (2016)
  - Total: 3,737
- Time zone: UTC+3:30 (IRST)

Kahshang Rural District (Persian: دهستان كاهشنگ) is in the Central District of Birjand County, South Khorasan province, Iran. Its capital is the village of Marak.

== Demographics ==
=== Population ===
At the time of the 2006 National Census, the rural district's population was 3,991 in 1,155 households. There were 3,338 inhabitants in 1,092 households at the following census of 2011. The 2016 census measured the population of the rural district as 3,737 in 1,210 households. The most populous of its 49 villages was Marak, with 569 people.

=== Other villages in the rural district ===
- Gugchin
- Kuch Elqar
- Mirozg
- Roqiyehabad
- Sar Chah-e Tazian
- Siskan
- Zirak
