= Baqeran Rural District =

Rural district in South Khorasan province, Iran

Baqeran Rural District Persian: دهستان باقران
- Rural District
- Location within Iran
- Coordinates: 32°52′N 59°15′E
- Country: Iran
- Province: South Khorasan
- County: Birjand
- District: Central
- Established: 1987
- Capital: Amirabad-e Pain

Population (2016)
  - Total: 34,071
- Time zone: UTC+3:30 (IRST)

Baqeran Rural District (Persian: دهستان باقران) is in the Central District of Birjand County, South Khorasan province, Iran. Its capital is the village of Amirabad-e Pain.

== Demographics ==
=== Population ===
At the time of the 2006 National Census, the rural district's population was 14,651 in 4,378 households. There were 26,940 inhabitants in 7,497 households at the following census of 2011. The 2016 census measured the population of the rural district as 34,071 in 9,042 households. The most populous of its 248 villages was Hajjiabad, with 7,749 people.

=== Other villages in the rural district ===
- Aliabad-e Luleh
- Bojd
- Chahkand
- Hoseynabad
- Khorashad
- Nowferest
- Showkatabad
