= Central District (Birjand County) =

District in South Khorasan province, Iran

Central District (Birjand County) Persian: بخش مرکزی شهرستان بیرجند
- District
- Location within Iran
- Coordinates: 32°58′N 59°10′E
- Country: Iran
- Province: South Khorasan
- County: Birjand
- Capital: Birjand

Population (2016)
  - Total: 261,324
- Time zone: UTC+3:30 (IRST)

The Central District of Birjand County (Persian: بخش مرکزی شهرستان بیرجند) is in South Khorasan province, Iran. Its capital is the city of Birjand.

== History ==
In 2021, Shakhen and Shakhenat Rural Districts were separated from the district in the formation of Shakhenat District.

== Demographics ==
=== Population ===
At the time of the 2006 National Census, the district's population was 196,834 in 52,986 households. The following census in 2011 counted 230,487 people in 63,949 households. The 2016 census measured the population of the district as 261,324 inhabitants in 74,657 households.

=== Administrative divisions ===
Central District (Birjand County) Population
Administrative Divisions	2006	2011	2016
Alqurat RD	8,236	12,026	9,479
Baqeran RD	14,651	26,940	34,071
Fasharud RD	2,727	2,124	2,435
Kahshang RD	3,991	3,338	3,737
Shakhen RD (Note: Transferred to Shakhenat District after the 2016 census)	6,276	5,130	5,372
Shakhenat RD	3,105	2,909	2,594
Birjand (city)	157,848	178,020	203,636
Total	196,834	230,487	261,324
RD = Rural District
