= Birjand County =

County in South Khorasan province, Iran

Birjand County Persian: شهرستان بیرجند
- County
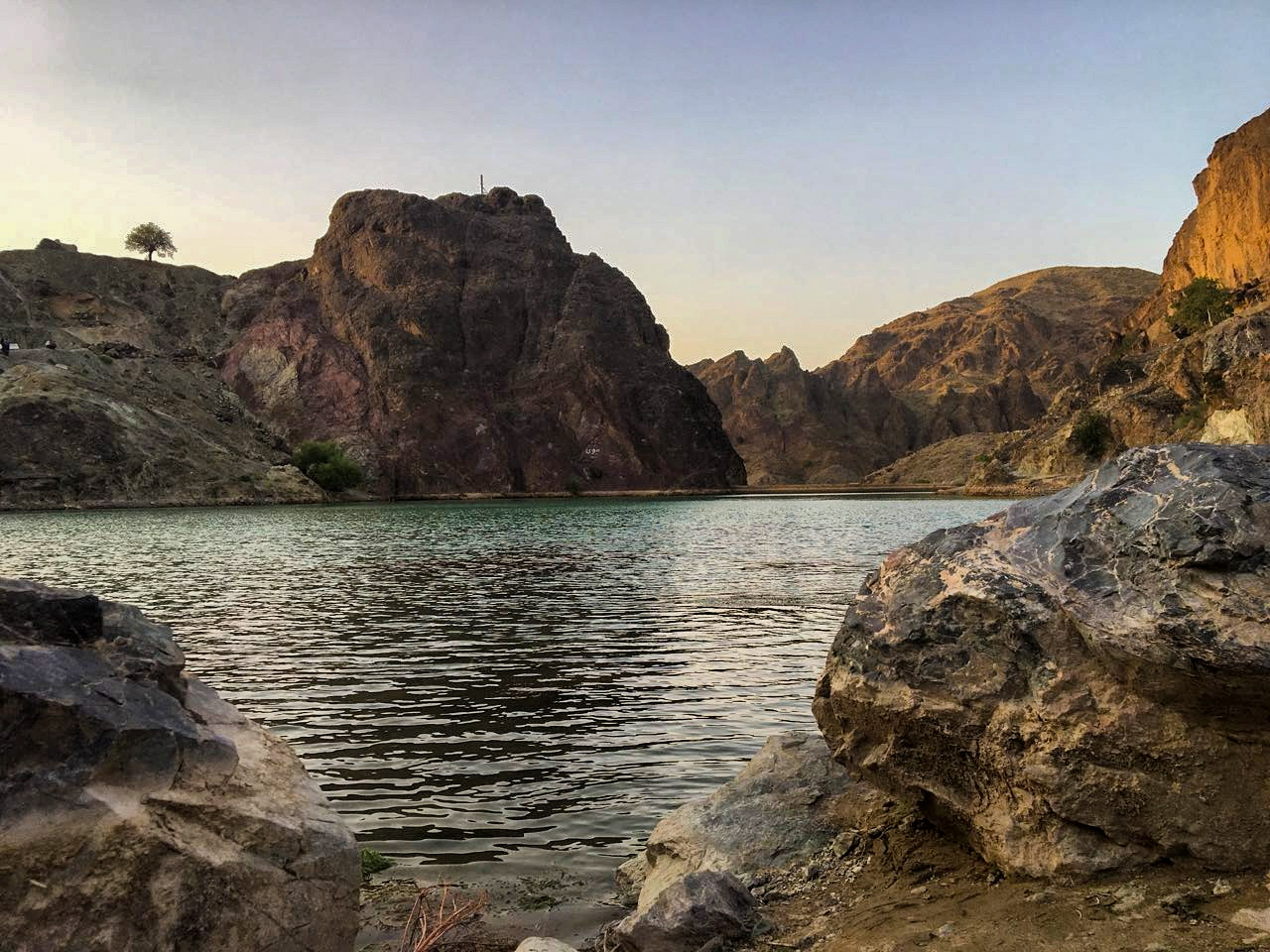
- Band-e Darreh

- Location of Birjand County in South Khorasan province (center, yellow)

- Location of South Khorasan province in Iran
- Coordinates: 33°05′N 59°10′E
- Country: Iran
- Province: South Khorasan
- Capital: Birjand
- Districts: Central

Population (2016)
  - Total: 261,324
- Time zone: UTC+3:30 (IRST)

Birjand County (Persian: شهرستان بیرجند) is in South Khorasan province, Iran. Its capital is the city of Birjand.

== History ==
The village of Mohammadiyeh was converted to a city and renamed Mohammadshahr in 2007. In 2011, Khusf District was separated from the county in the establishment of Khusf County.

In 2021, Shakhen and Shakhenat Rural Districts were separated from the Central District in the formation of Shakhenat District.

== Demographics ==
=== Population ===
At the time of the 2006 National Census, the county's population was 221,756 in 60,240 households. The following census in 2011 counted 259,506 people in 71,384 households. The 2016 census measured the population of the county as 261,324 in 74,657 households.

=== Administrative divisions ===
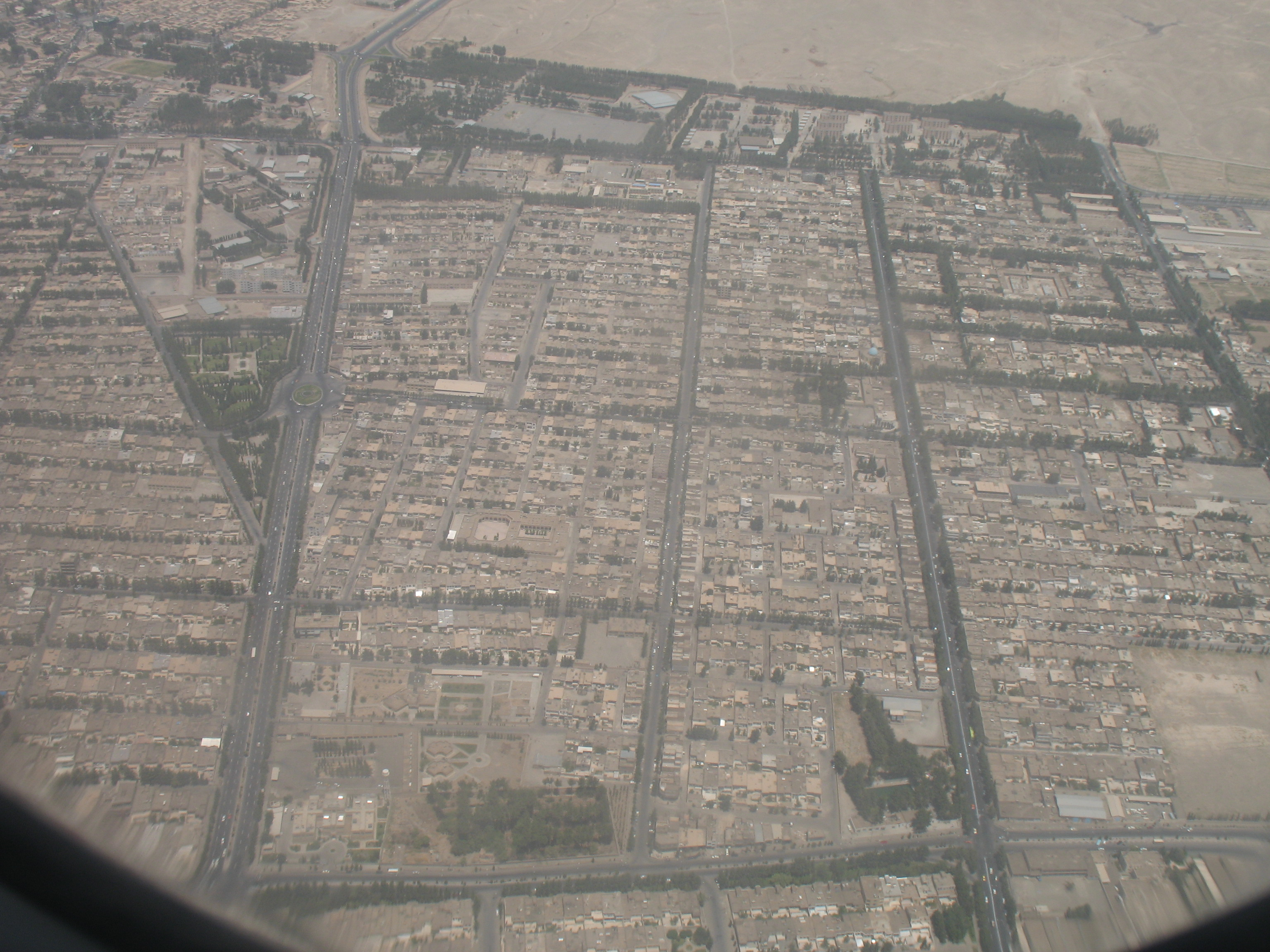
Aerial view of Birjand, 2006

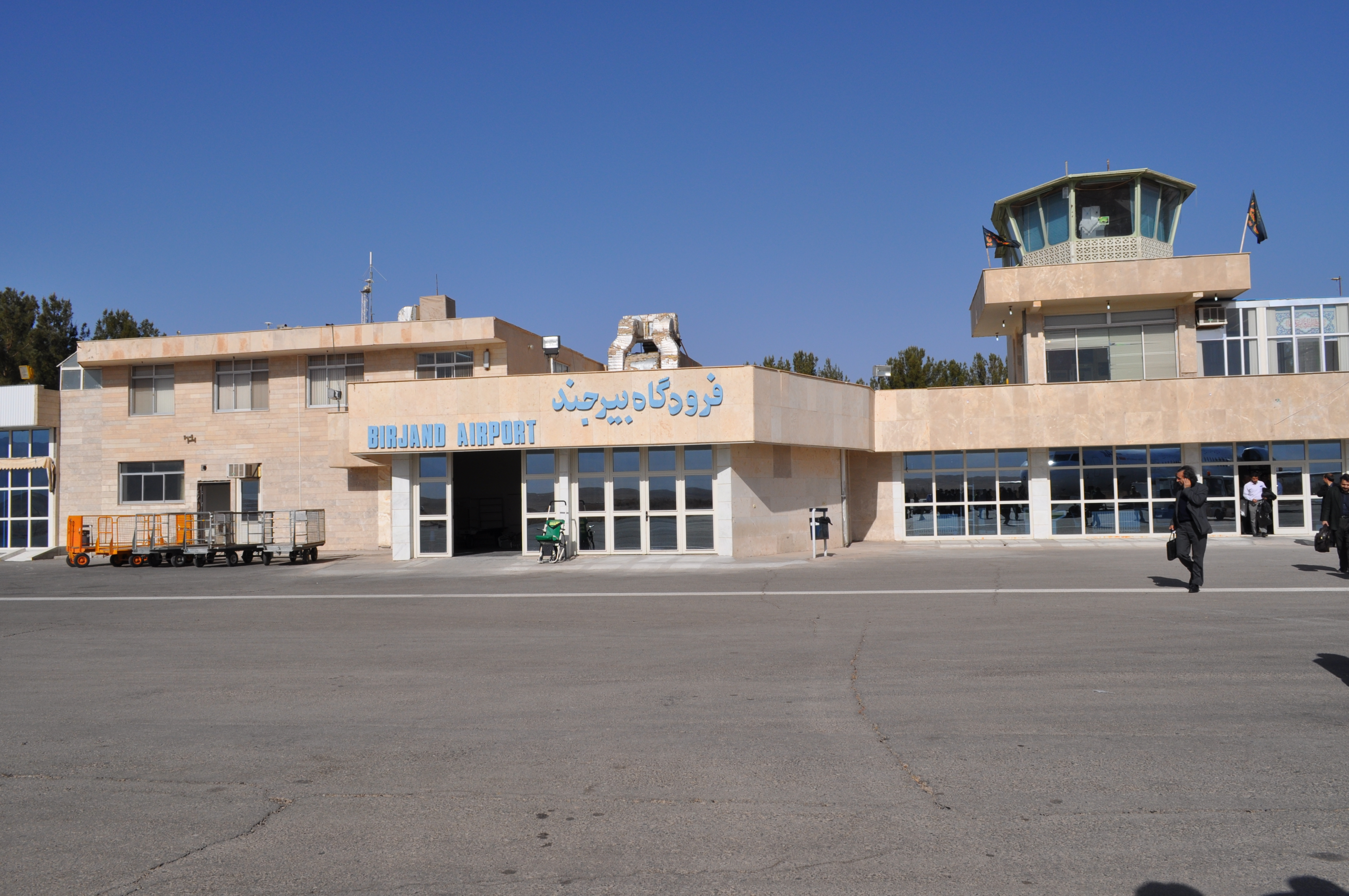
Birjand's airport

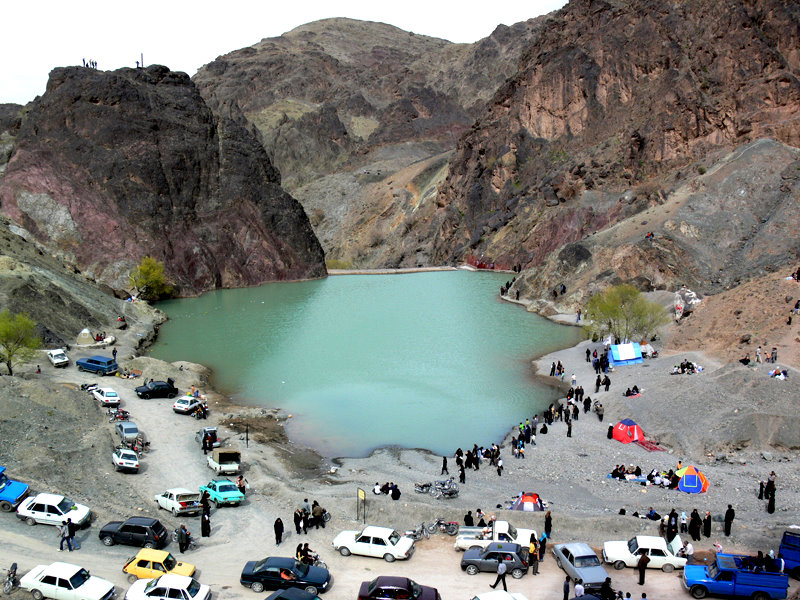
Band-e Darreh, 5km south of Birjand

Birjand County's population history and administrative structure over three consecutive censuses are shown in the following table.

Birjand County Population
Administrative Divisions	2006	2011	2016
Central District	196,834	230,487	261,324
Alqurat RD	8,236	12,026	9,479
Baqeran RD	14,651	26,940	34,071
Fasharud RD	2,727	2,124	2,435
Kahshang RD	3,991	3,338	3,737
Shakhen RD	6,276	5,130	5,372
Shakhenat RD	3,105	2,909	2,594
Birjand (city)	157,848	178,020	203,636
Khusf District (Note: Transferred to Khusf County)	24,922	29,019	
Barakuh RD	3,919	2,496	
Jolgeh-ye Mazhan RD	4,280	4,536	
Khusf RD	9,419	11,464	
Qaleh Zari RD	4,118	3,896	
Khusf (city)	3,186	4,920	
Mohammadshahr (city) (Note: Formerly the village of Mohammadiyeh)		1,707	
Shakhenat District (Note: Established after the 2016 census)			
Shakhen RD			
Shakhenat RD			
Total	221,756	259,506	261,324
RD = Rural District

== Geography ==
=== Location ===
Birjand County is bordered by Qaen County to the north, Zirkuh County to the northeast, Darmian and Sarbisheh Counties to the east, Khusf County to the south, and Sarayan County to the west.

=== City of Birjand ===
The capital of the county is the city of Birjand, which is also the capital of South Khorasan province. According to the 2016 census, the population of Birjand was 203,636. It is the first city in Iran to have a water supply organization, the Birjand Water Pipeline Company. Birjand is also the second city in Iran to have urban water piped in 1923, before Tehran.

The Shokatiyeh School of this city is the third modern-style education school, after Dar al-Fonon and Roshdieh of Tabriz. Due to the political and strategic location of Birjand, the country's third airport was built in this city in 1933, after Qaleh Morghi and Bushehr.

== Health ==
=== Imam Reza Hospital ===
Imam Reza Hospital was established in one of the lands and endowments belonging to the Alam family, known as Bagh-e Anari. In addition to accepting patients in Birjand city, this hospital also accepted other patients in southern cities of Khorasan province.

== Notable people ==
- Abd al-Ali al-Birjandi, 16th century astronomer
- Hakim Nezari Quhestani
- Amir Ali Khan Sheibany, PhD, founder and first CEO of Zob Ahan Esfahan (Esfahan Steel Company)
- Seyyed Mohammad Tadayyon
- Asadollah Alam, prime minister of Iran during Pahlavi dynasty
- Sima Bina, Iranian folk music singer
- Ahmad Kamyabi Mask, writer and renowned theater scholar
- Mohammad Hassan Ganji, geographer
- Mohammad Reza Hafeznia
- Ardalan Shoja Kaveh, actor

== See also ==
Media related to Birjand County at Wikimedia Commons
