= Rahmatabad Mound =

Archaeological site in Iran

Coordinates: 30.2033°N 53.1790°E

The Rahmatabad Mound or the Rahmatabad Tepe (Persian: تپه رحمت آباد, 5th millennium BC) is one of the most historically significant settlements on the Marvdasht plain, Iran, measuring 115 m (377 ft) in length, 75 m (246 ft) in width, and 4.5 m (15 ft) in height. The mound sits at the edge of the fertile Kamin plain (near the town of Saadat Shahr) at the southerly end of the Tangeh Bolaghi.

== ‌Background ==
On 5 June 2005, a team of Iranian and foreign archaeologists began a new phase of excavations at the mound, which is located near Pasargadae in the Marvdasht region. The team, made up of Iranian experts and a number of U.S. archaeologists from Binghamton University, has been tasked with saving the artifacts and gathering information from the ancient site, which is threatened by road construction and the canals that will transport water from the Sivand Dam, which is scheduled to become operational at the ancient site of Tangeh Bolaghi in March. The team also plans to revise the dating of the region through exact stratigraphy and to carry out palynological and phytological studies on the region.

"Since it is the most important mound in the area and quite close to Persepolis, any exploration in Rahmat-Abad could possibly render answers to our raft of questions on the way people lived their lives and built their dwellings." said Mohammad Hassan Talebian, head of the Pasargadae and Parse project.

== Geography ==
Located 140 kilometers north of Shiraz, the provincial capital of Fars, Rahmatabad Tepe is one of the most significant ancient sites in the Marvdasht region. It has a cold climate in the hilly areas and a moderate climate in its other regions.

Archaeological excavations have shown that civilized populations had been living in the Marvdasht Plains millenniums before Darius the Great decided to construct Persepolis in the plains of Rahmat mountain. The ruins of Istakhr and Persepolis demonstrate a part of history of this city.

== Excavations ==
"The latest excavations on the Rahmatabad Tepe in 2006 led to the discovery of a large number of ancient shards and kilns, and an important industrial site dating back to the 5th millennium BC." Iranian Center for Archaeological Research Director Mohammad-Hassan Fazeli Nashli told the Persian service of CHN on Tuesday.

"The archaeologists have unearthed 12 square-shaped coupons (tokens), indicating that the people of the region had economic and commercial ties with neighboring regions in the fourth and fifth millenniums BCE," the director of the team added.

Iranian archeologists have discovered priceless artifacts during their geophysics surveys and now they want to unearth them.

== Date ==
The tepe dates to the Chalcolithic era like the Tall-e Bakun site on the plain of Persepolis. This phase of the excavation work at Rahmatabad Tepe will continue for one more month.

A long cultural sequence has been found with a 9 m (30 ft) in depth cultural deposit. From the top, the following ancient layers have been found,

1. Achaemenian (fifth century BC)
2. Early-Middle Bakun culture (early to mid-fifth millennium BC)
3. Pottery Neolithic (late seventh millennium BC)
4. Pre-Pottery Neolithic (late eighth to early seventh millennium BC)

"The latest excavations on the Rahmatabad Tepe in 2006 led to the discovery of a large number of ancient shards and kilns, and an important industrial site dating back to the 5th millennium BC." Iranian Center for Archaeological Research Director Mohammad-Hassan Fazeli Nashli told the Persian service of CHN on Tuesday.

The archaeologists have discovered 6000-year-old clay coupons during excavations at Rahmatabad Tepe, the director of the team said.
