= Shokooh Mirzadegi =

Iranian novelist and poet

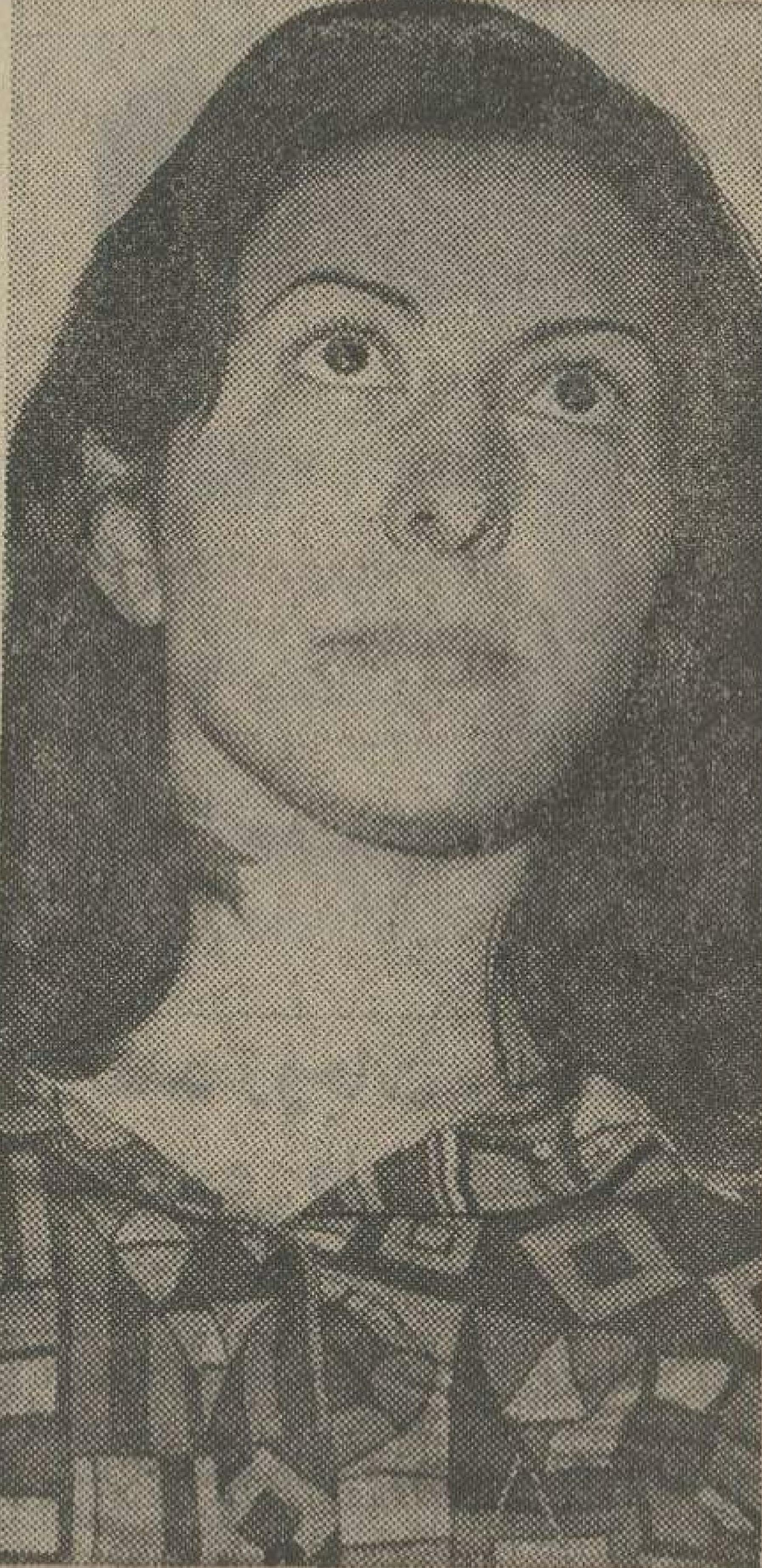
Image of Shookooh

Shokooh Mirzādegi (Persian: شکوه ميرزادگی) began her literary work, both as a novelist and a poet, with Ferdowsi magazine and Kayhan daily in the late 1960s in Iran. Over the past four decades, she has been one of the most active figures in the Iranian literary community, both inside and outside Iran.

== Career ==
During her time in Iran, she published two collections of short stories, Bi-gharāri-hā-ye Pāydār (بی قراری های پايدار – Permanent Restlessness) and Āghāz-e Dow'wom (آغاز دوم – The Second Beginning), two plays, Tab'idi-e Sāl-e 3000 (تبعيدی سال 3000 – The Exiled of the Year 3000) and Man Harekat Mikonam, Pas Hastam (من حرکت می کنم پس هستم – I Move, Therefore, I Am) and a number of children's books. Amongst the latter, Gol va Āftāb (گل و آفتاب – The Flower and the Sun) is the most well-known. She also wrote numerous articles of the literary, social and feministic nature. She was further the editor-in-chief of Talāsh (Struggle) Magazine.

Alongside her activities as a teacher of Persian language and Literature, she has been actively involved in issues related to education and women's studies, the results of which have been published in the form of a series of articles and papers.

In the early 1970s, using her ex-husband's surname and writing under Shokooh Farhang, she participated in the activities of a group of Iranian writers and artists to free political prisoners. This led to their arrest and trial. She, along with many others of this group, were initially sentenced to death. On accepting to plea for pardon on a TV show-trial, she and some other co-defendants were freed after a while. Two of the group's members were executed however and some spent long-term prison sentences in jail.

After regaining her freedom, she began writing again and in 1977 was able to obtain permission to travel abroad. She settled for some time in London but before long returned home to witness the revolution of 1978–1979. After the new regime came to power, she was arrested again and was released only after the intervention of some Human Rights activists, notably Abdolkarim Lahiji of International Federation of Human Rights Leagues.

She returned to London to begin her life in exile in 1980. Her works in this period comprises publishing of a socio-political periodical called Moghāvemat (مقاومت – Resistance), and a socio-literary periodical called Mamnu'e-hā (ممنوعه ها – The Forbiddens). She co-edited the latter with the late Manouchehr Mahjoubi. She also wrote a pamphlet on the historical conditions of Iranian women called Say'r-e nozuli-ye moghe'iyyat-e zan az āghaz tā eslām (سير نزولی موقعيت زن از آغاز تا اسلام – The downward trend of the social status of women from beginning until Islam). Together with Esmail Nooriala, she co-edited a literary magazine called Puyeshgarān (پويشگران – Explorers) for eight years.

She founded the Iranian Women Organization of Great Britain and participated in the foundation of Society for Iranian Writers and Artists in Britain. She also has founded the Center for Iranian Women's Documents and Studies in the United States.

Her first major novel, Bigāneh-yi dar man (بيگانه ای در من – A Stranger Within Me), was published in 1993. Three years later, she published a collection of her short stories Golden Ārk (گلدن آرک – Golden Ark) and in 1987 she wrote and staged a play with feminist themes. The English translation of Bigāneh-yi dar man, A Stranger Within Me, was published in 2000. Her other works have been translated into French, German and Japanese.

She has also published numerous articles on literary and social subjects during her time in the United Kingdom and, now, the US, and has widely travelled and lectured on literary and socio-feminist subjects.

She and her husband, Esmail Nooriala, immigrated to the United States in 1995, where between 2001 and 2005 they produced and hosted two weekly television programs, Kārgāh-e Andisheh (کارگاه انديشه – The Thought Workshop) and Bar Miz-e Tashrih (بر ميز تشريح – On the Operating Table). The main emphasis of these programs were on subjects related to women, human rights and political prisoners. The programs were broadcast via satellite and reached the entire globe, including Iran.

In August 2005, on finding that when Sivand Dam in the Fars province, Iran, became operational, the archaeological sites of the Pasargadae Plains would be inundated, she, together with another individual, founded the International Committee to Save the Archaeological Sites of the Pasargadae Plains, and has since then supervised the activities of its international branches.

== Books ==
- Shokooh Mirzadegi, That Stranger Within Me, translated from Persian (بيگانه ای در من – Bigāneh-yi dar man) by Esmail Nooriala, 191 p. (IBEX Publishers, Bethesda, Maryland, 2002). ISBN 0-936347-83-X
- Shokouh Mirzadagui, Par delà le néant, translated from Persian by Ahmad Kamyabi Mask. Paris: Caractères, 1985.

== See also ==
- Tangeh Bolaghi
- Sivand Dam
