= Kuch =

Kuch كوچ
- Village
- Location within Iran
- Coordinates: 32°43′00″N 59°26′02″E
- Country: Iran
- Province: South Khorasan
- County: Birjand
- Bakhsh: Central
- Rural District: Baqeran

Population (2006)
  - Total: 104
- Time zone: UTC+3:30 (IRST)
  - Summer (DST): UTC+4:30 (IRDT)

Kuch (Persian: كوچ, also Romanized as Kūch; also known as Kooch Nahar Khan and Kūch-e Now Ferest) is a village in Baqeran Rural District, in the Central District of Birjand County, South Khorasan Province, Iran. At the 2006 census, its population was 104, in 44 families. The village of Kuch holds significant importance due to its ancient rock engravings known as the Lakh Mazar engravings, which are considered valuable historical documents in South Khorasan Province.

This historical collection consists of 307 engravings carved on an ophiolite rock, depicting human figures, animals, plants, symbols, and inscriptions in Pahlavi from the Parthian and Sasanian periods, as well as Arabic and Persian inscriptions from the Islamic era.

Among the oldest evidence of human presence in South Khorasan, the Lakh Mazar rock engravings are regarded by cultural heritage experts as some of the most credible historical records related to the region. These engravings, which are found on a rock surface that is dark green to black and measures 5 by 5 meters, span a long period from prehistory to the late Islamic era.

The collection at Lakh Mazar includes 307 engravings featuring human, animal, and plant motifs, as well as Pahlavi, Parthian, Sasanian, Arabic, and Persian inscriptions. These rock engravings are among the oldest discovered artifacts in South Khorasan (Quhistan). Although the engravings at Lakh Mazar have not yet been fully translated and interpreted, the inscriptions that have been deciphered emphasize the significance of this site across various historical periods, particularly during the Sasanian era.
