= Lakh Mazar =

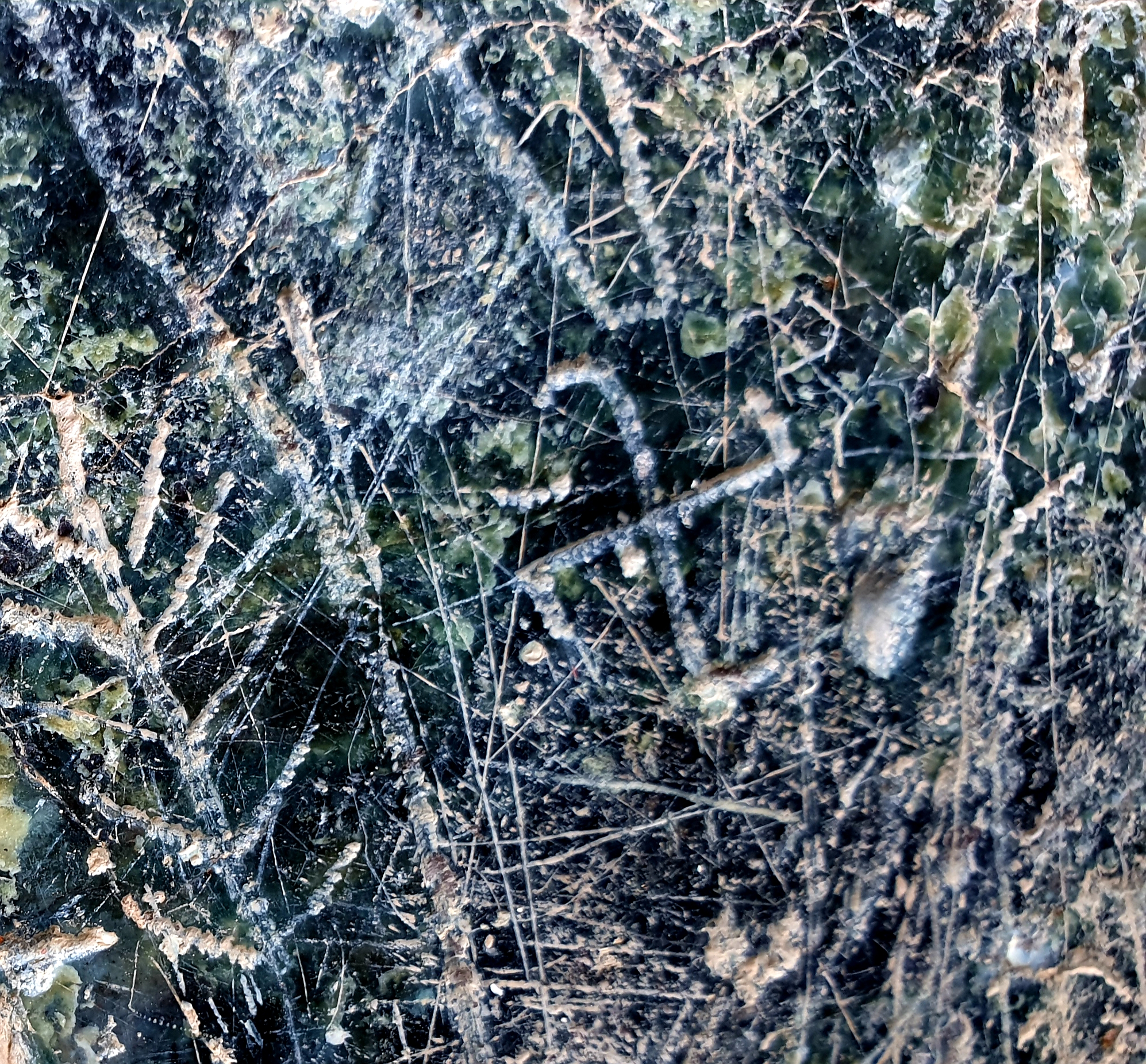
Lakhmazar

The Lakh Mazar inscription is a prehistoric stone wall estimated to be more than 7,000 years old and located near the Kooch and Khorashad villages, about 29 km away from Birjand, Iran. It is the most valuable memorial plaque in eastern Iran due to its diversity and historical importance. The inscriptions were discovered by the Birjand Historical Research group and, after preliminary studies, 307 images, including a collection of inscriptions and motifs on the rocky mountains of Bagheran, were identified. Each inscription has a unique style from the period of its creation and can be analyzed independently of the others. As a general category, the Lakh Mazar inscriptions can be attributed to four major historical periods: the stone, prehistoric, historical, and Islamic periods. The inscriptions depict human, animal, and plant signs and symbols. From the 307 paintings and engravings on the rocks, 22 depict humanity, 33 depict animals, and 35 depict plant life. There are four pictorial lines, 81 inscriptions dated to the Pahlavi, Parthian, or Sassanid empires, 42 with Perso-Arabic script, and 67 rock paintings which have yet to be identified.

== Swastikas ==
The Lakh Mazar inscriptions contain swastikas or spinning wheels inscribed on stone walls. One instance is in Khorashad, Birjand, on the Lax e Mazar. Due to vandalism, some have been destroyed.

== See also ==
- Iran
- Tall-i Bakun
- Persia
- Rahmatabad Mound
- Cities of the ancient Near East
- Khorashad
- Mahmuei
- Mud
- zibad
