= Tall-e Bakun =

Pre-historic site in Fars province, Iran

Tall-e Bakun تل باکون
- Location within Iran
- 29°54′48″N 52°53′12″E
- Type: settlement
- Periods: Chalcolithic
- Location: Marvdasht, Fars province, Iran

History
- Built: 5th millennium BC

Site notes
- Excavation dates: 1929, 1932, 1937, 1956, 2004
- Archaeologists: Ernst Herzfeld, Alexander Langsdorff, Donald McCown, Namio Egami, Abbas Alizadeh
- Condition: Ruined
- Owner: Public
- Public access: Yes

Iran National Heritage List
- Official name: Tall-e Bakun
- Type: Mound
- Designated: 1932
- Reference no.: 189
- Conservation organization: Cultural Heritage, Handicrafts and Tourism Organization of Iran

Tall-e Bakun or Tall-i Bakun (Persian: تل باکون) is a prehistoric site located in Fars province, Iran. It is an ancient Ancient Near Eastern site about 3 kilometers south of Persepolis in the Kor River basin. It was inhabited during bakun period of pre 5500–4100 BC and followed with Lapuid period around 4100–3500 BC in its second fade.

== Archaeology ==
The site consists of two mounds, A (about 2 hectares in area) and B. In 1928, exploratory excavation was done by Ernst Herzfeld, of the University of Berlin. Alexander Langsdorff and Donald McCown conducted full scale excavations in 1932. Additional work was done at the site in 1937 by Erich Schmidt leading the Persepolis Expedition of the Oriental Institute of the University of Chicago. Some limited work, a single trench, was done at Tall-i Bakun by a team from the Tokyo University led by Namio Egami and Seiichi Masuda in 1956. The most recent excavations, 3 small trenches, were by a joint team of the Oriental Institute and the Iranian Cultural Heritage and Tourism Organization in 2004.

== History ==
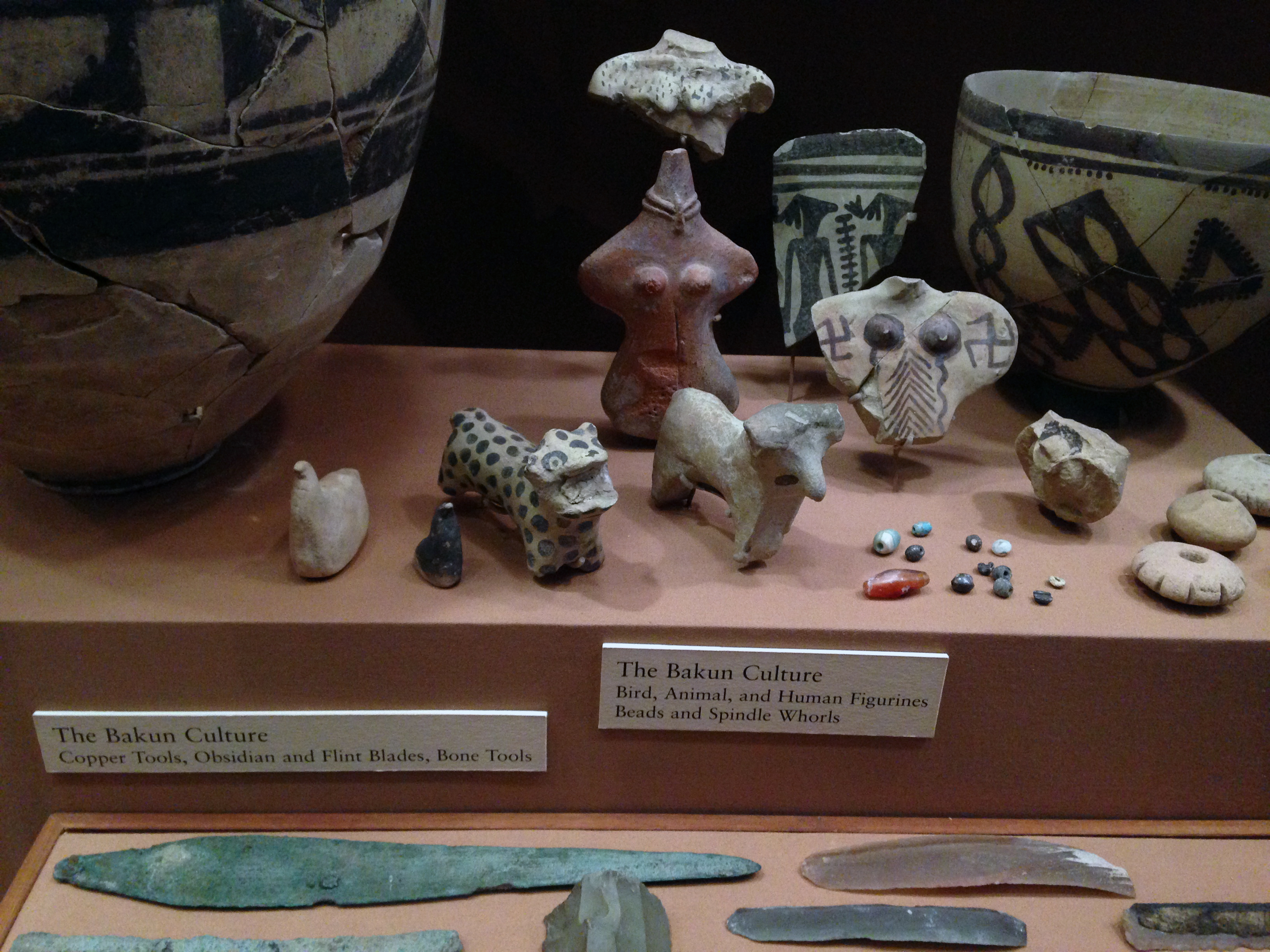
Artifacts of Tall-e Bakun in University of Chicago Oriental Institute

The site was active from circa 6th millennium BC to circa 4th millennium BC.

Tall-e Bakun phase A was inhabited c. 4000–3500 BC. Four layers can be distinguished. Layer III was the best preserved and shows a settlement in which the residential buildings were built close together with no roads or paths. Individual houses consisted of several rooms. Remains of mural paintings and of wooden columns suggest a once rich interior. Richly painted pottery was produced. There were also ceramic female figurines and those of animals. Artifactual remains from the site include objects made of copper, pottery and stone.

Around 140 fired clay sealings were found in various buildings, the majority being from use as door seals. They were created using stamp seals.

The wealth and variety of material items at Bakun and the evidence of large workshop areas point to the existence of local industry and connection/trade with distant regions such as the Persian Gulf, the central plateau, Kerman, and northeastern Iran whence goods like shells, copper, steatite, lapis, and turquoise were procured. If my inferences are correct, we have a settlement that is spatially arranged according to its functional needs and socio-economic organization.

Four other nearby Bakun period sites Tall-e jaleyan Tappeh Rahmatabad, Tol-e Nurabad, and Tol-e Pir were three times larger than the 'A' layer of excavation from Tall-e Bakun site

== Kiln technology ==
Tall-e Bakun 'A' is the only site in the area providing a long sequence of ancient kilns. These double-chamber kilns were in use for at least 300 years with no significant changes.

A number of other kilns in the Near East share some elements of the Bakun kilns. There are close parallels with those of Tepe Gawra of the same time period. Also there are parallels with those from the Sinai Peninsula of the Egyptian New Kingdom period. Similar designs are not found elsewhere in the Levant.

== Bakun culture ==
The Bakun culture flourished in the Fars province of Iran in the late fifth and fourth millenniums BC. It had a long duration and wide geographical distribution which Its pottery tradition was extremely sophisticated and influential to the surrounding regions which the pottery from Susa in much later durations showed the same cultural and traditional refinement and antiquity.

Bakun pottery (Bakun-ware) is known in the Fars region in the form of bowls and jugs with green, reddish brown or deep brown bands and stripes.

Outside Fars this pottery has been found in northern and eastern Khuzestan, and in the Behbahan and Zuhreh regions as well.

In the late fifth and early fourth millennia BC, Bakun A settlements were at once manufacturing sites and centres for the administration of production and trade. Their painted pottery featured some unusual specific motifs, such as large-horned mountain sheep and goats, that were rare or unique elsewhere.

After the decline of Bakun, Lapui period followed. In recent publications, Bakun period is dated 5400-4100 BC, and the Lapui period is dated 4100–3500 BC.

== Gallery ==
Examples of pottery from Tall-e Bukan

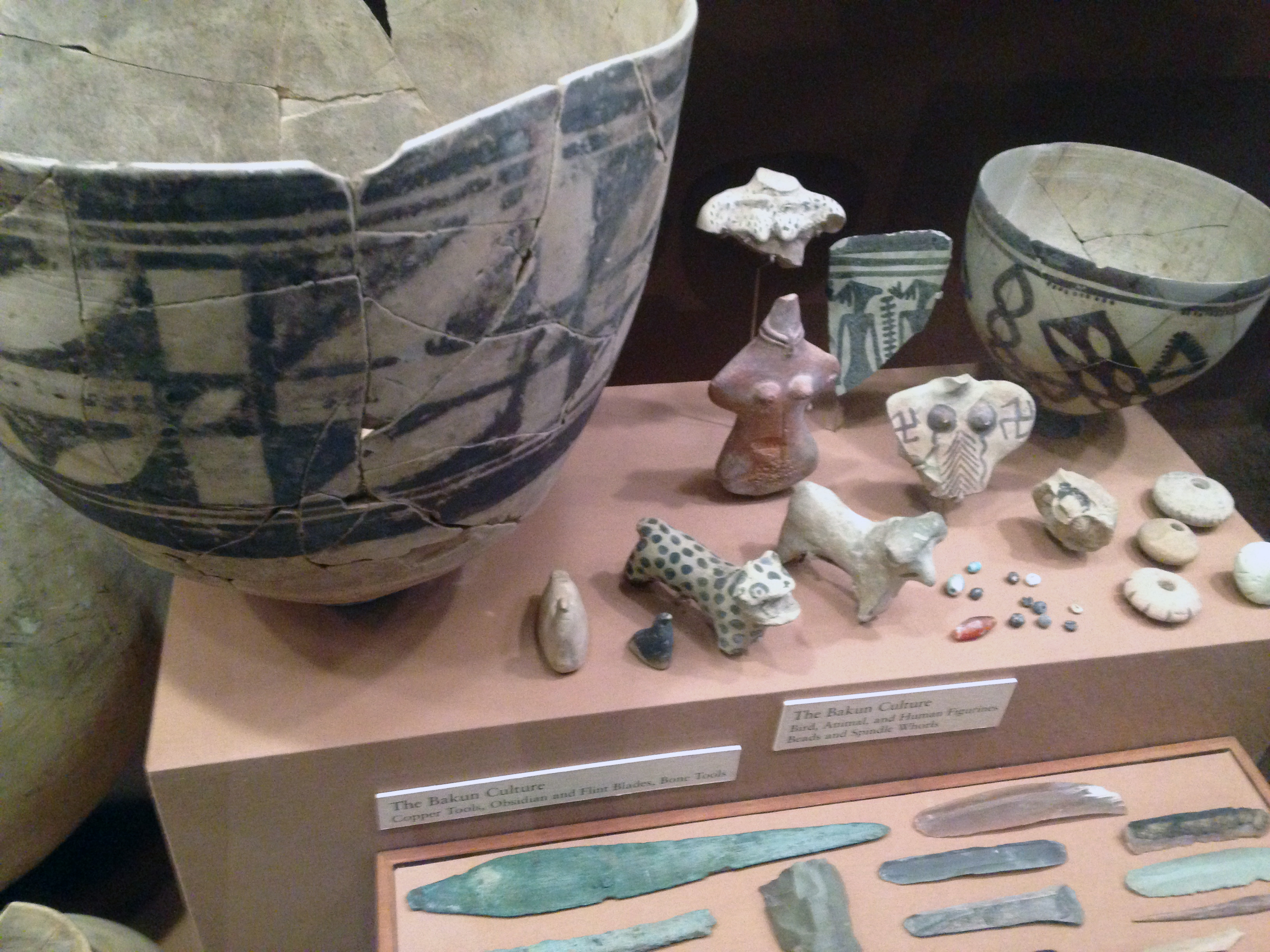
Various artifacts, Bakun culture, 4200-3800 BCE, Oriental Institute, Chicago

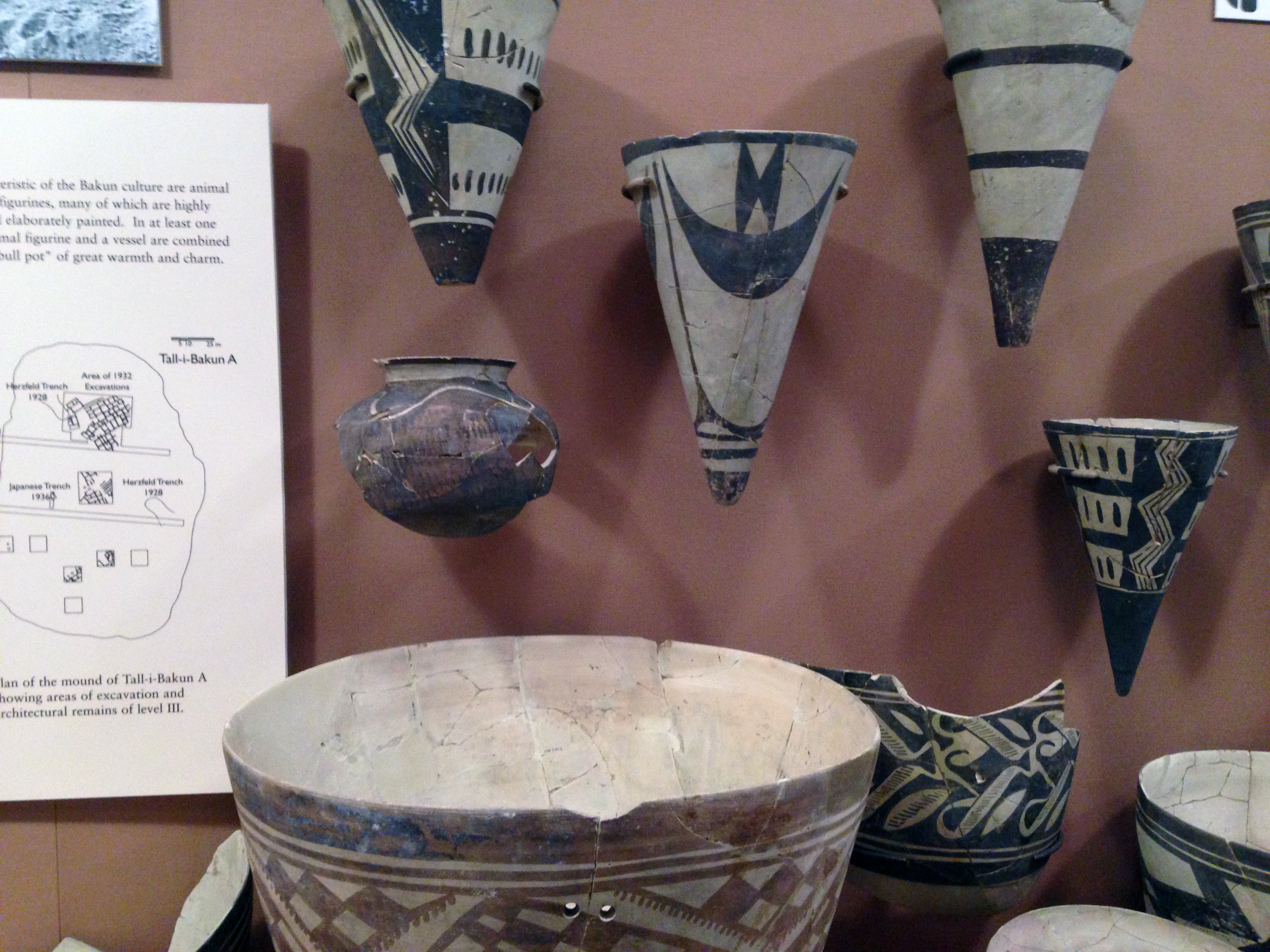
Pottery, Bakun culture, Oriental Institute, Chicago

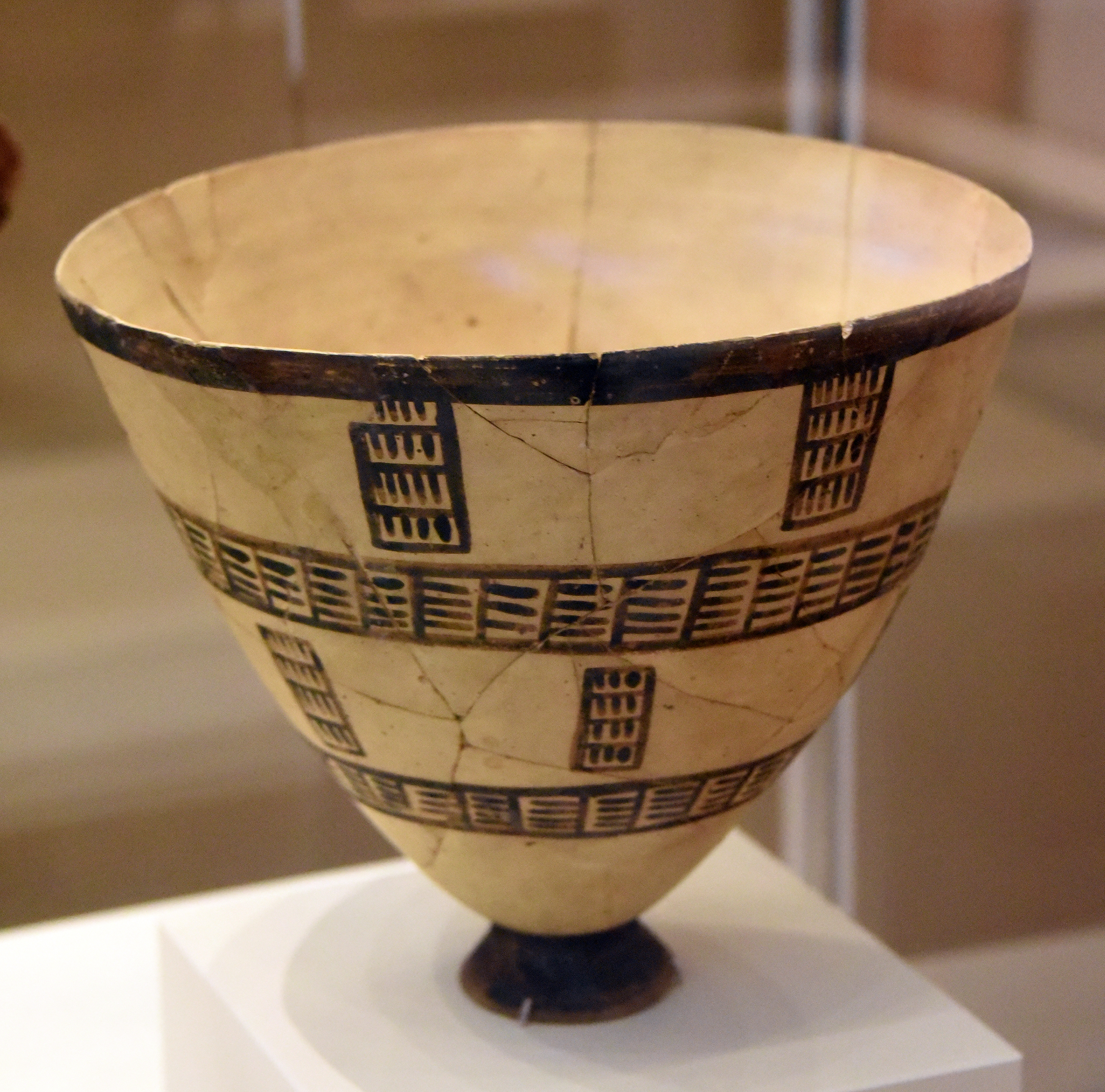
Handmade pottery vessel. Painted, 4500-4000 BCE, British Museum, London

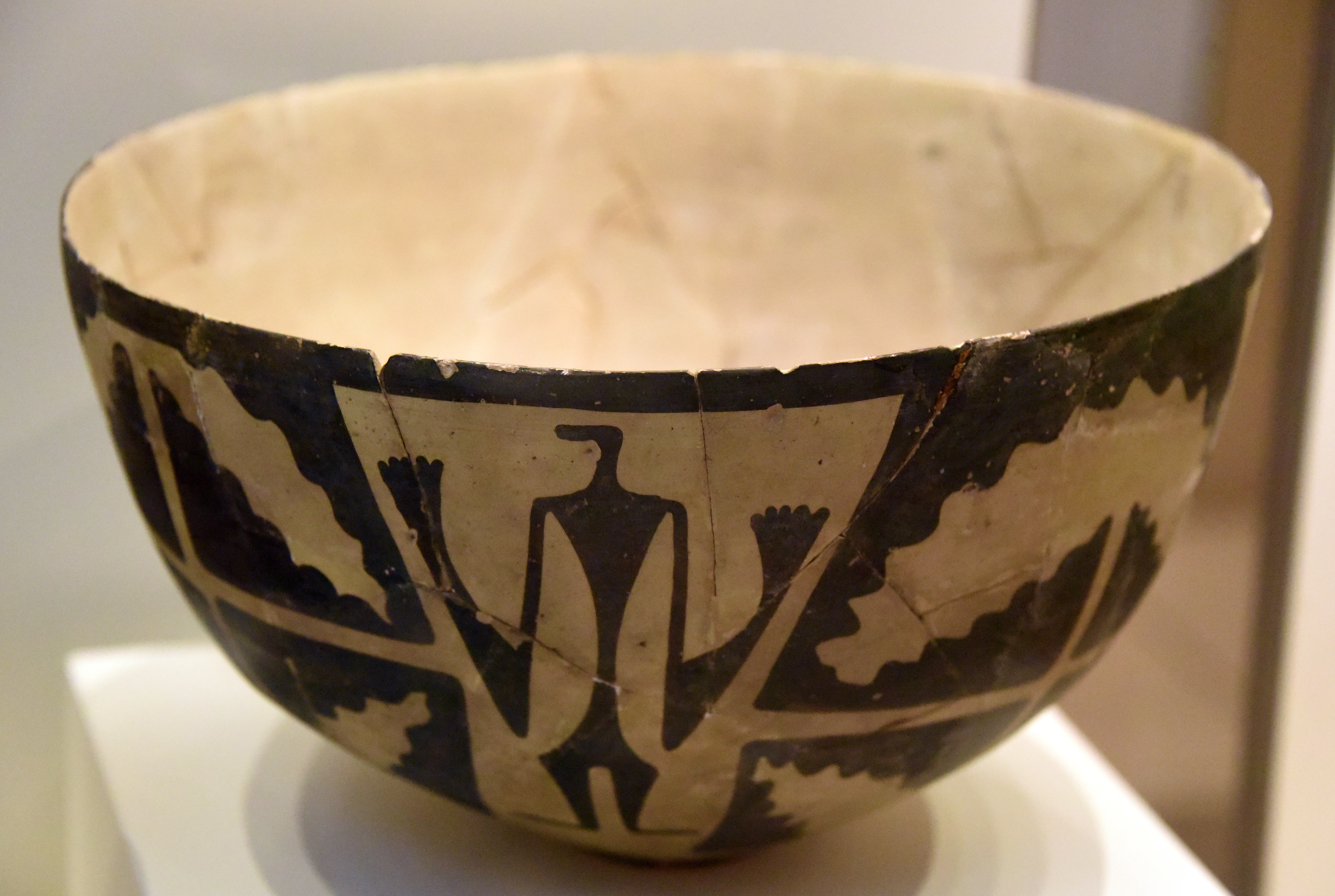
Handmade bowl painted with three standing or dancing figures, c. 4000 BCE. British Museum, London

== See also ==
- Cities of the ancient Near East
- lakh Mazar
- List of Iranian artifacts abroad
- Rahmatabad Mound
- Tapeh Tyalineh
