= Tangeh Bolaghi =

Archaeologically significant valley in Iran

Coordinates: 30.2033°N 53.1790°E

Tangeh Bolāghi, also transliterated as Tange-ye Bolāghi (Persian: تنگه بلاغی), or Bolāghi Gorge, is an archaeologically significant valley consisting of 130 ancient settlements, dating back to the period between 5000 BCE and the Sasanian era (224–651 CE). It is situated in Iran's southern province of Fars, some 7 kilometres from Pasargadae. This is the valley of the Polvar River, a tributary to Kor River.

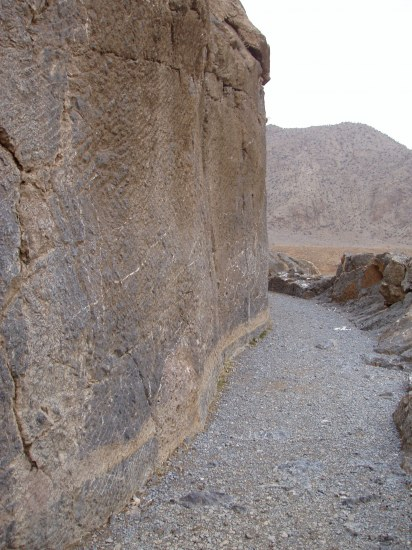
The Royal Road (Rāh-e Shāhi)

Archaeological research since 2005 have discovered a section of the Royal Road (Rāh-e Shāhi – راه شاهی) connecting Pasargadae to Persepolis, Susa and other regions of the Persian Empire up to Sardis. Excavations have provided archaeologists with a unique insight into the lives of the people living in the Achaemenid era.

== Archaeology ==
Prior to Sivand Dam being completed in 2007, rescue archaeology was conducted in the area.

In May 2005, archaeologists unearthed a complete human skeleton at one of the excavation sites, thought to date back to the Sasanian era (224–651). The skeleton, found in a squatting position, is of an adult man. An earthenware item was also found at this site which is considered to be the largest ancient earthenware of its kind ever found in Iran. In April 2006, this find was overshadowed by the discovery of the 7000-years old skeleton of a young woman dating from the Tall-e Bakun Era (the fifth and fourth millennia BC) by a joint Iranian-German team of archaeologists in the same area. The archaeologists further found eight stone beads with the skeleton close to her wrists and neck. "The girl was buried while sleeping on her side and bending her legs with arms under her head like the sleep position of most children", according to the head of the team.

When the Sivand Dam came into full service in 2007, part of an ancient site including the Achaemenid Shah's Road between Cyrus's tomb and Pasargadae, 130 ancient settlements and a palace ascribed to Darius the Great may have been immersed in water from the rising Polvar River. However, some reports indicated that there was not enough water flow in the river to fill up the dam completely.

== Gallery ==
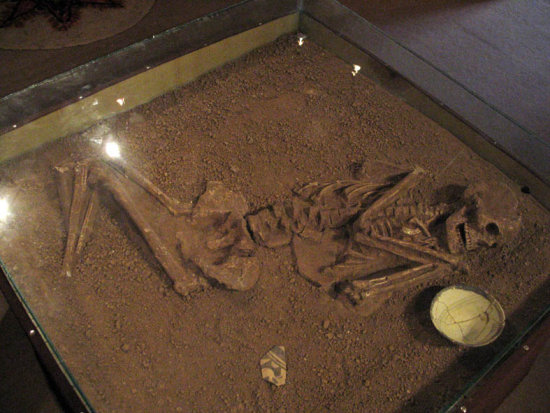
Skeleton of a young woman (estimated to have been between 14 and 16 at the time of death) dating from 7000 years ago, excavated in Tangeh Bolāghi

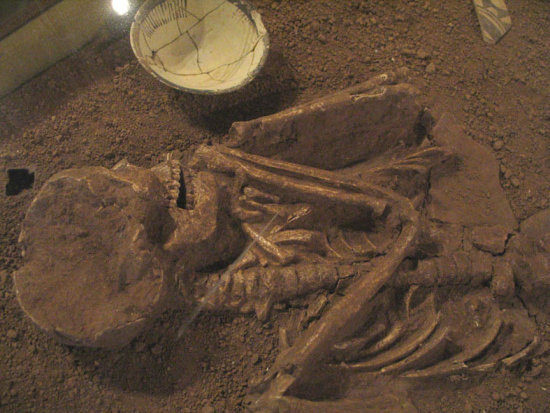
The same as the previous photograph
