= Marvdasht =

City in Fars province, Iran

Marvdasht Persian: مرودشت
- City
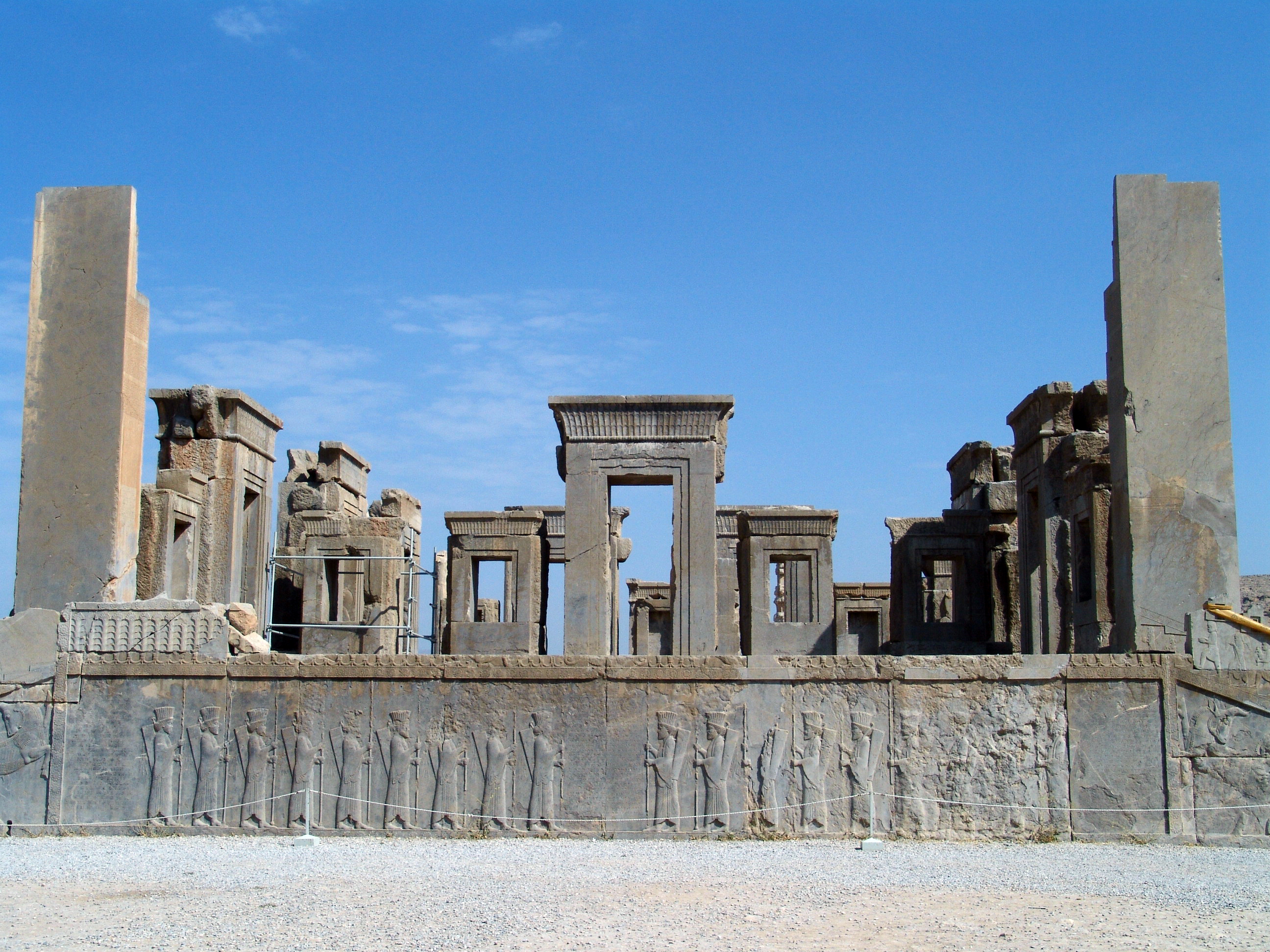
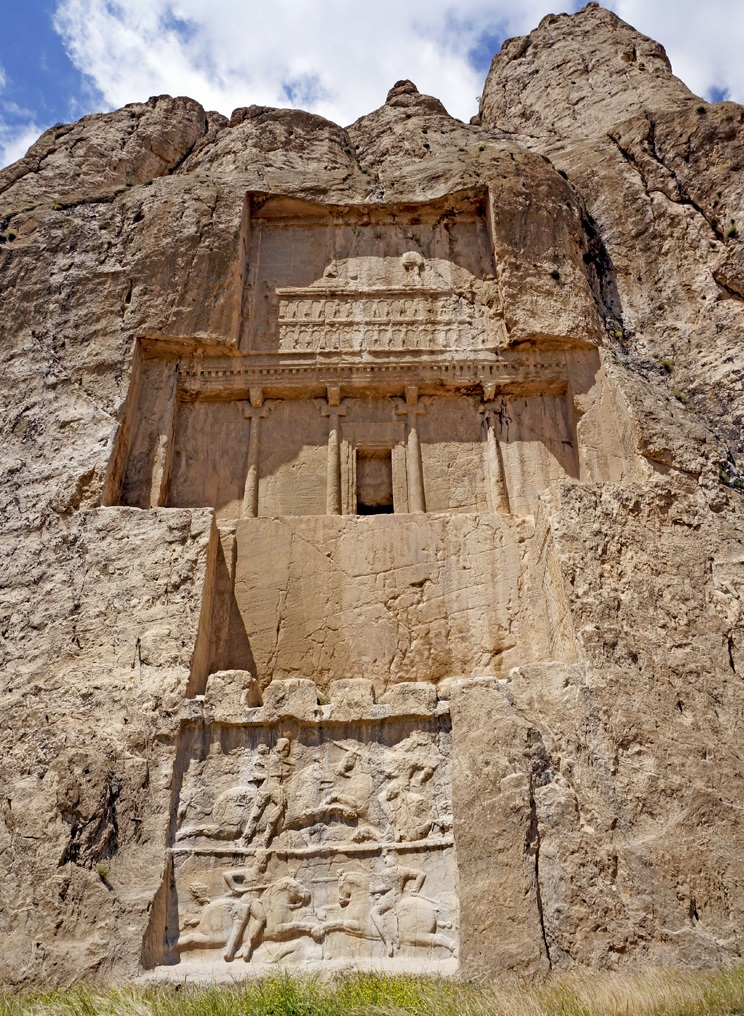
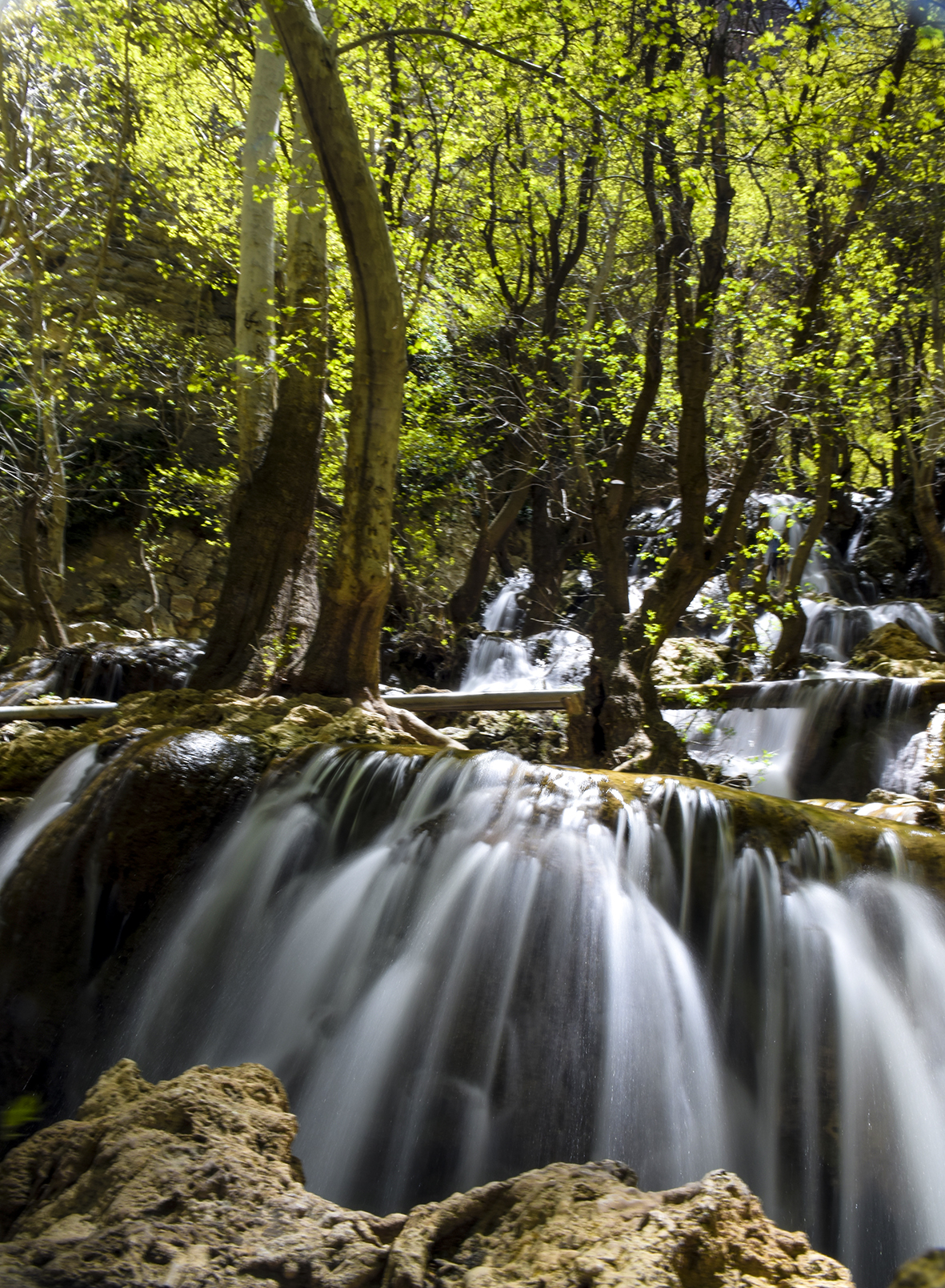
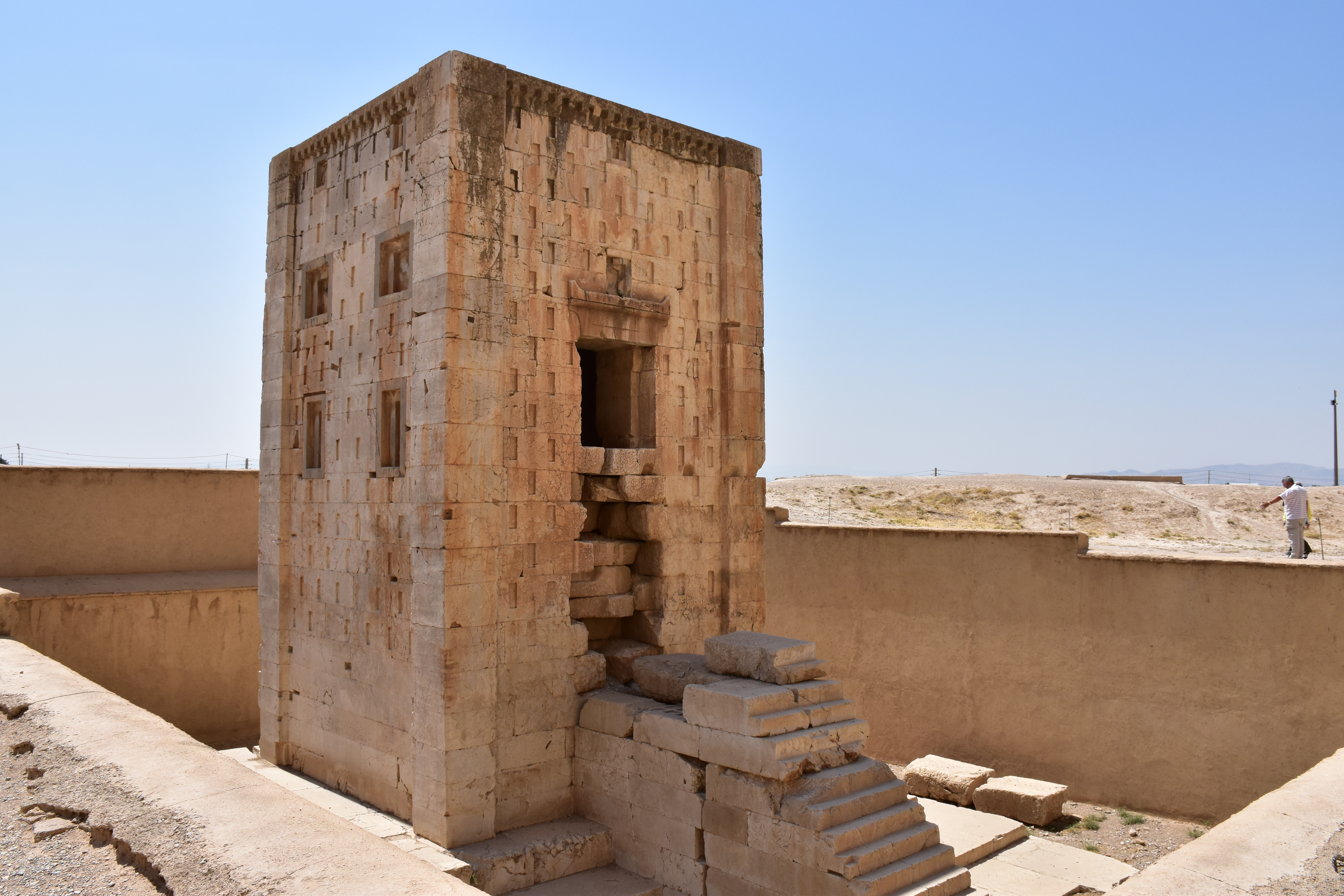
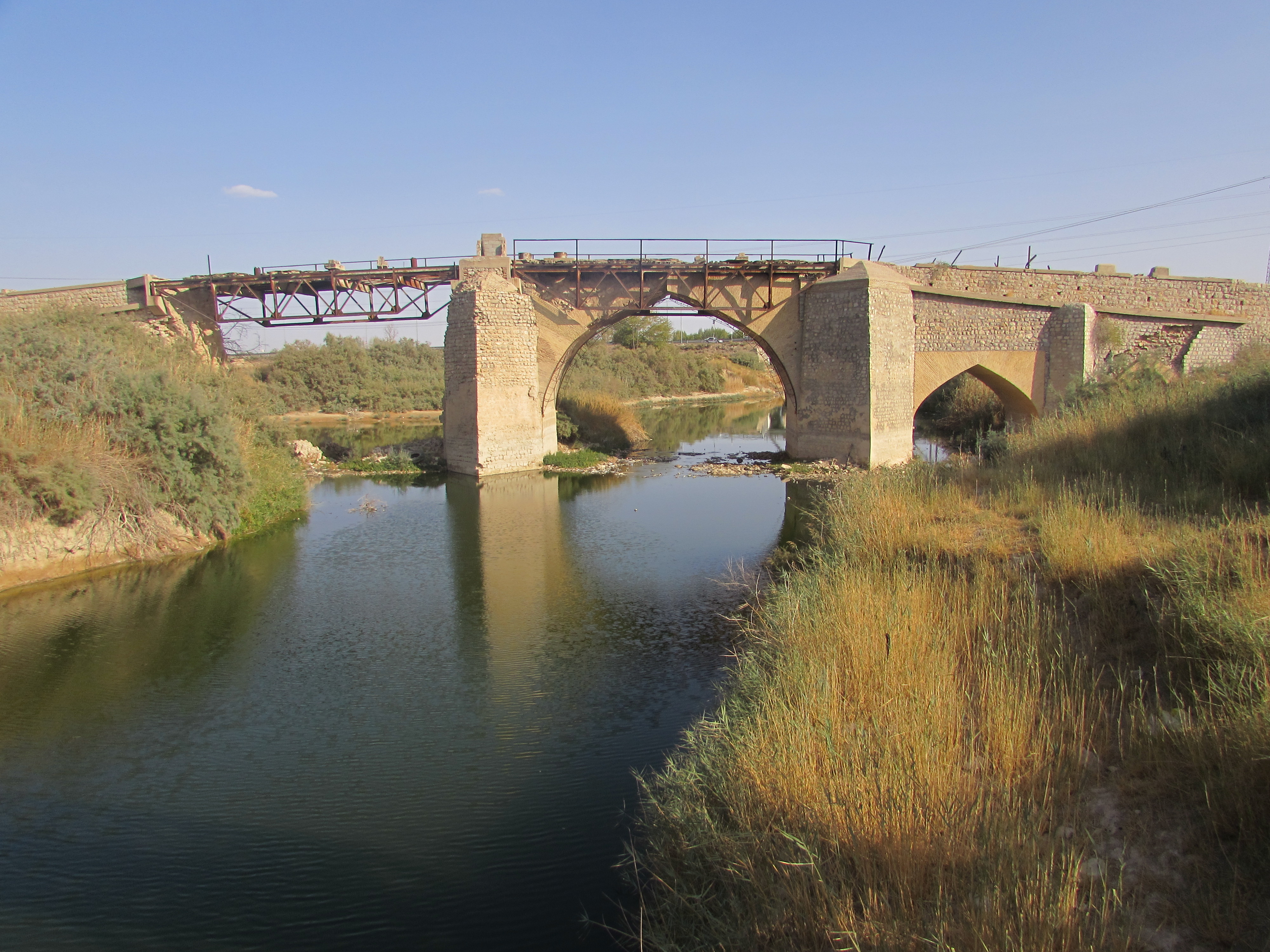
- From top to bottom, left to right: Persepolis, Tomb of Darius the Great, Tange Bostanak, Cube of Zoroaster, Pol-e Khan

- Location within Iran
- Coordinates: 29°52′43″N 52°48′24″E
- Country: Iran
- Province: Fars
- County: Marvdasht
- District: Central

Population (2016)
  - Urban: 148,858
- Time zone: UTC+3:30 (IRST)

Marvdasht (Persian: مرودشت) (Note: Also romanized as Marv Dasht) is a city in the Central District of Marvdasht County, Fars province, Iran, serving as capital of both the county and the district.

== Etymology ==
Some historians hold that Marvdasht was originally the name of one of the neighborhoods of the ancient city of Estakhr, until gradually the whole area was called Marvdasht. Others have argued that marv was the name of a plant which grew in the area and the suffix dasht (meaning plain in the Persian language) was added to form a descriptive placename.

== History ==
Marvdasht is as ancient as the history of Iran and the Persian Empire. Its former capital Persepolis is in the vicinity of the city, and a few kilometers farther Naqsh-e-Rostam, Naqsh-e Rajab and the ruins of the ancient city of Estakhr are reminiscent of the region's importance in historic times.

Archaeological excavations have shown that civilized people had already been living in the Marvdasht Plains for millennia when Darius chose the plains of mount Rahmat for his royal residence.

The modern city of Marvdasht was constructed in the 20th century. After the Pahlavi government built a sugar factory in 1935 (1314 Persian calendar), the city gradually developed around the factory. More and more people left the nearby villages or abandoned their nomadic life to settle in the developing city.

People from farther areas also migrated to the city. In the years before the 1979 Iranian Revolution, Marvdasht became the most important industrial city of Fars province, as other factories such as the petrochemical complex, Azmayesh (producing household appliances and intended to be biggest in the Middle East), the Charmineh leather factory, the Fars meat complex and the Dadli biscuit company were constructed. These required a huge workforce, and the population of Marvdasht increased until it became the second most populated city in Fars province.

The fertile lands around the city were cultivated to make Marvdasht into the major center of Iranian agriculture, producing more wheat, maize, tomato, cucumber and other agricultural products than any other region.

During the 2026 Iran war, an attack on a petrochemical complex located in the city on 6 April 2026 caused a fire, but it was contained.

== Demographics ==
=== Population ===
At the time of the 2006 national census, the city's population was 123,858 in 29,134 households. The following census in 2011 counted 138,649 people in 37,918 households. The 2016 census measured the population of the city as 148,858 people in 43,528 households.

== Geography ==
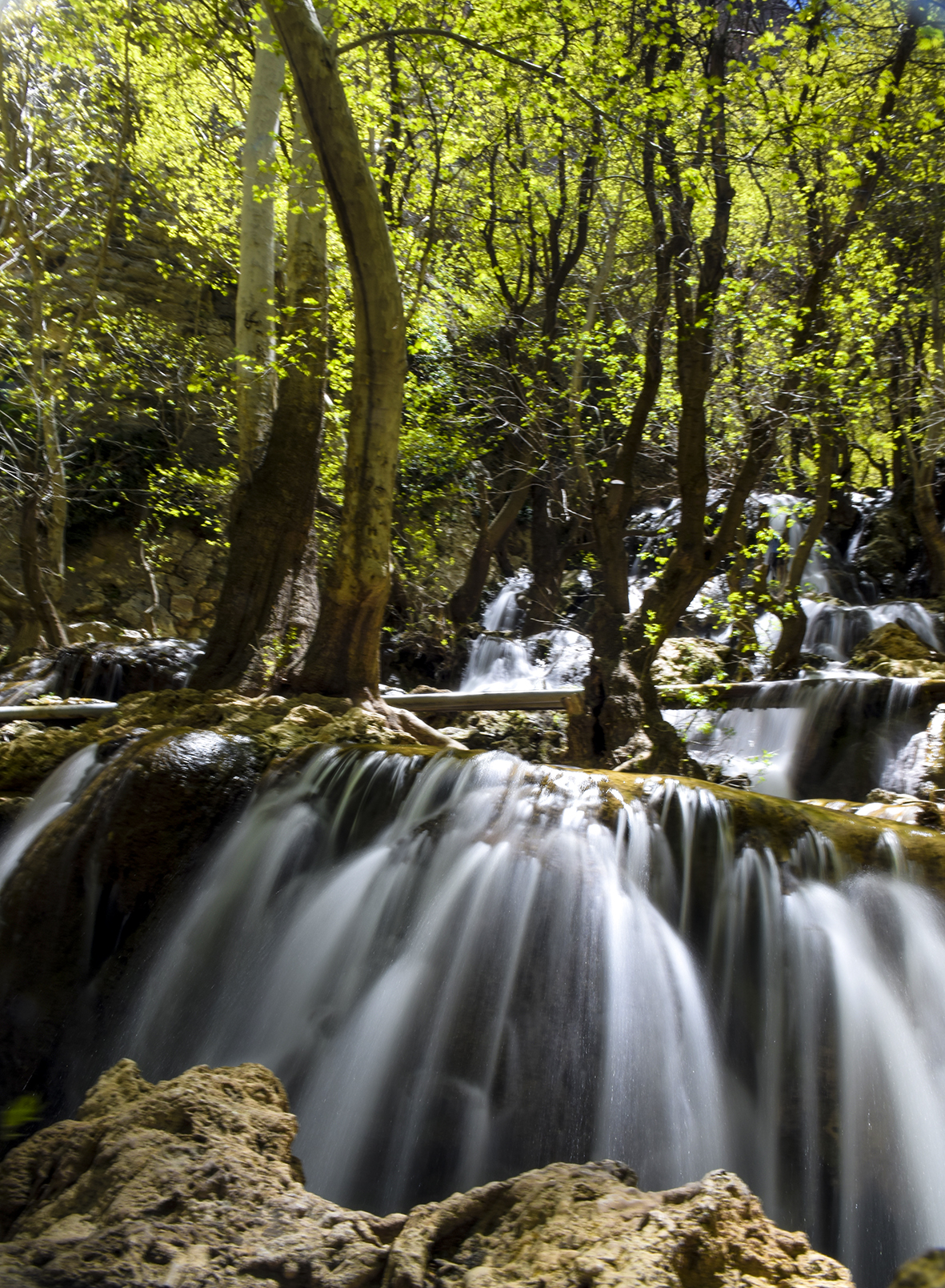
Tange Bostanak in Kamfirouz

Marvdasht is one of the northern cities and also counties of Fars province. The city is located 45 km north of Shiraz and has an altitude of 1620 meters above the sea level. The county has an area of 3687 square kilometers and neighbors Arsenjan in the east, Pasargad in the north, Khorambid and Eghlid in the northwest, Sepidan in the southwest and Shiraz in the south.

There are three cities in the county: Marvdasht, Seydan and Kamfirouz. Marvdasht as a county is divided into four districts: Central, Kamfirouz, Doroudzan and Seydan. Marvdasht has cold weather in the hilly areas and moderate climate in other regions.

== Higher education ==
The city has six universities: Islamic Azad University, Marvdasht Branch; Fars Science and Research University; Payame Noor University, Marvdasht center; a branch of Technical and Vocational University; and a branch of University of Applied Science and Technology.

== Archaeology ==
The Tokyo University Iraq-Iran Archaeological Expedition, headed by Namio Egami, carried out three seasons of excavations in the Marv Dasht plain from 1956 to 1965.

The excavations took place at the following prehistoric mounds situated in the vicinity of Marvdasht and Persepolis.

- Tall-i Bakun A and B
- Tall-i Gap A
- Tall-i Jari A and B
- Tall-i Mushki

At Tall-e Gap many ceramic items were found. The site was identified as an important settlement of the ancient Bakun culture, belonging to the Middle Bakun sub-phase of the 5th millennium BCE Chalcolithic.

== Civilian casualties of 2025-26 Iranian protests in Marvdasht, Fars ==
Beginning on 28 December 2025, mass demonstrations erupted across multiple cities in Iran amid a deepening economic crisis and widespread dissatisfaction with the government. While initially sparked by frustration over skyrocketing inflation, rising food prices, and the severe depreciation of the Iranian rial, the protests quickly evolved into a broader movement demanding an end to the Islamic Republic's rule.

Hengaw Organization of Human Rights reported the killing of Mansur Mokhtari, a Lor resident of Marvdasht in Fars Province, was killed on the evening of Thursday 1 January 2026, after being shot at close range by government forces. The shooting occurred in front of Police Station No. 11, where Mokhtari was struck in the abdomen by live ammunition fired from a Kalashnikov-type rifle, resulting in his death.
