= Pasargadae =

Archaeological site in Fars province, Iran

- پاسارگاد (Persian)
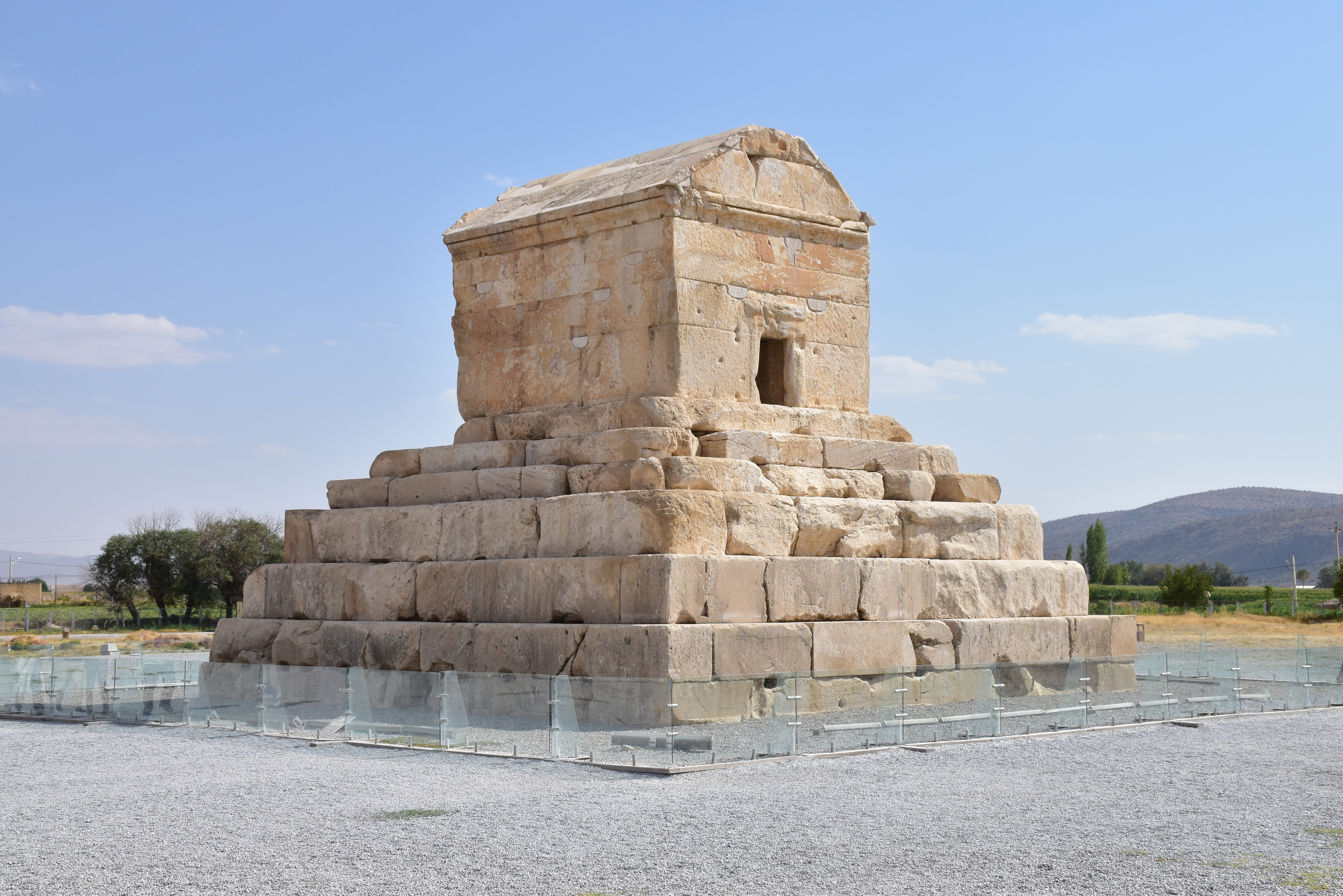
- Tomb of Cyrus the Great in Pasargadae

- Location within Iran
- 30°12′00″N 53°10′46″E
- Type: Settlement
- Periods: Achaemenid Empire
- Cultures: Persian
- Location: Fars province, Iran
- Region: Iran

History
- Built: 6th century BCE
- Built by: Cyrus the Great

Site notes
- Material: Stone, clay
- Archaeologists: Ali Sami, David Stronach, Ernst Herzfeld
- Condition: In ruins

Iran National Heritage List
- Official name: Pasargadae
- Type: Settlement
- Designated: 1931
- Reference no.: 19
- Conservation organization: Cultural Heritage, Handicrafts and Tourism Organization of Iran

UNESCO World Heritage Site
- Criteria: Cultural: (i), (ii), (iii), (iv)
- Reference: 1106
- Inscription: 2004 (28th Session)
- Area: 160 ha (0.62 sq mi)
- Buffer zone: 7,127 ha (27.52 sq mi)

Pasargadae (/pəˈsɑːrɡədi/; from Pāθra-gadā, lit. 'protective club' or 'strong club'; Persian: پاسارگاد, romanized: Pāsārgād) was the capital of the Achaemenid Empire under Cyrus the Great (559–530 BC), located just north of the town of Madar-e-Soleyman and about 90 kilometres (56 mi) to the northeast of the city of Shiraz. It is one of Iran's UNESCO World Heritage Sites. It is considered to be the location of the Tomb of Cyrus, a tomb previously attributed to Madar-e-Soleyman, the "Mother of Solomon".

== History ==
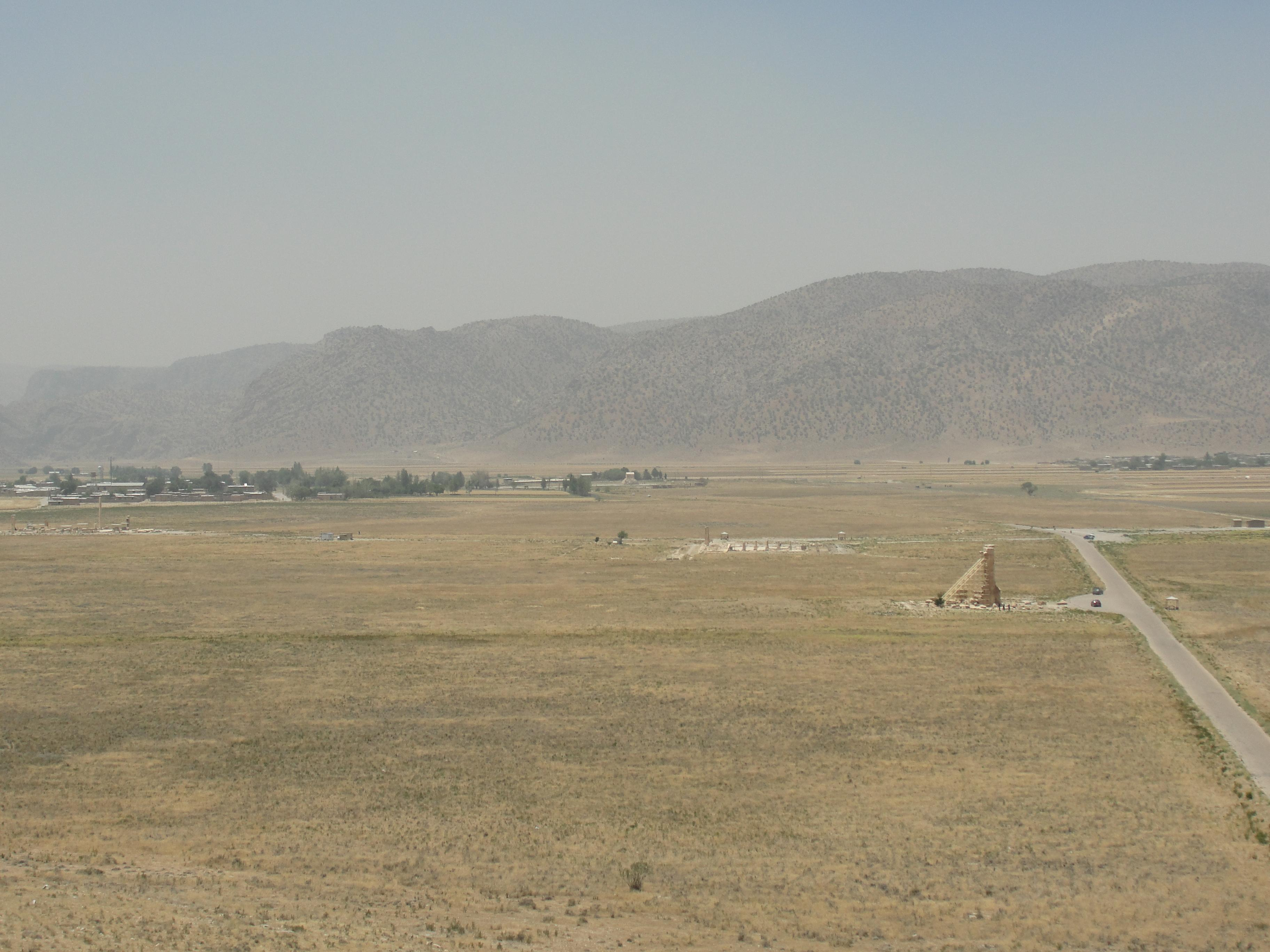
View of Pasargad from Toll-e Takht hill. The closest building to the tomb attributed to Cambyses II and the farthest building that can be seen in the center of the upper part of the image is the Tomb of Cyrus the Great. Between these two buildings, the ruins of Achaemenid palaces can be seen.

Pasargadae was founded in the 6th century BCE as the first capital of the Achaemenid Empire by Cyrus the Great, near the site of his victory over the Median king Astyages in 550 BCE. The city is named after his own royal clan. It remained the Achaemenid capital until Darius moved it to Persepolis.

The archaeological site covers 1.6 square kilometres (0.62 sq mi) and includes a structure commonly believed to be the mausoleum of Cyrus, the fortress of Toll-e Takht sitting on top of a nearby hill, and the remains of two royal palaces and gardens. Pasargadae Persian Gardens provide the earliest known example of the Persian chahar bagh, or fourfold garden design (see Persian Gardens).

The remains of the tomb of Cyrus' son and successor Cambyses II have been found in Pasargadae, near the fortress of Toll-e Takht, and identified in 2006.

The Gate R, located at the eastern edge of the palace area, is the oldest known freestanding propylaeum. It may have been the architectural predecessor of the Gate of All Nations at Persepolis.

== Tomb of Cyrus the Great ==
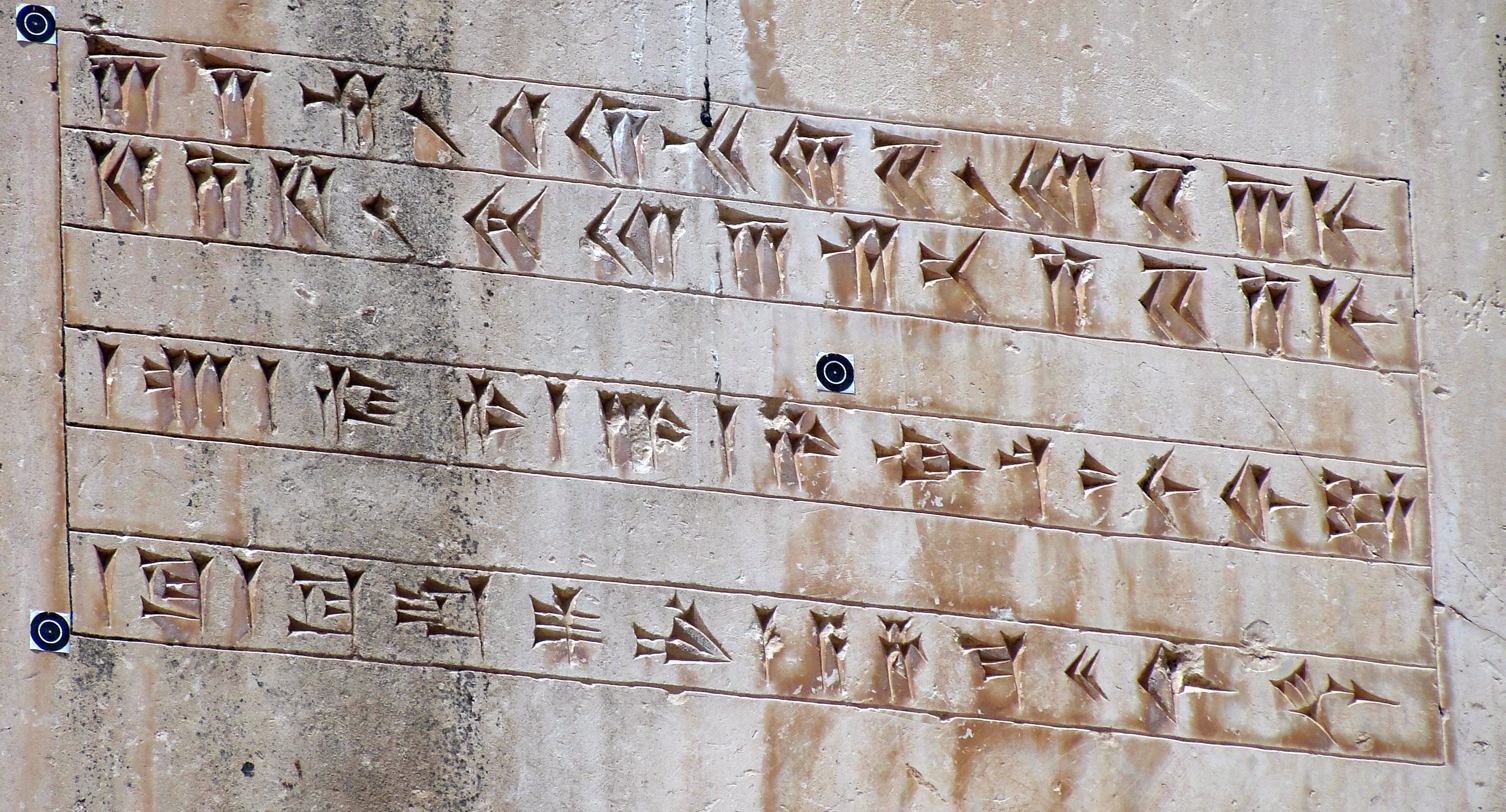
"I am Cyrus the king, an Achaemenid." in Old Persian, Elamite and Akkadian languages. It is carved in a column in Pasargadae

The most important monument in Pasargadae is the tomb of Cyrus the Great. It has six broad steps leading to the sepulchre, the chamber of which measures 3.17 metres (10.4 ft) long by 2.11 metres (6 ft 11 in) wide by 2.11 metres (6 ft 11 in) high and has a low and narrow entrance. Though there is no firm evidence identifying the tomb as that of Cyrus, Greek historians say that Alexander believed it was. When Alexander looted and destroyed Persepolis, he paid a visit to the tomb of Cyrus. Arrian recorded in the second century CE that Alexander commanded Aristobulus, one of his warriors, to enter the monument. Inside he found a golden bed, a table set with drinking vessels, a gold coffin, some ornaments studded with precious stones and an inscription on the tomb. No trace of any such inscription survives, and there is considerable disagreement about the exact wording of the text. According to Strabo and Arrian, it said:

Passer-by, I am Cyrus, who gave the Persians an empire, and was king of Asia.
Grudge me not therefore this monument.

The design of Cyrus' tomb is credited to Mesopotamian or Elamite ziggurats, but the cella is usually attributed to Urartu tombs of an earlier period. In particular, the tomb at Pasargadae has almost exactly the same dimensions as the tomb of Alyattes, father of the Lydian King Croesus; however, some have refused the claim (according to Herodotus, Croesus was spared by Cyrus during the conquest of Lydia, and became a member of Cyrus' court). The main decoration on the tomb is a rosette design over the door within the gable. In general, the art and architecture found at Pasargadae exemplified the Persian synthesis of various traditions, drawing on precedents from Elam, Babylon, Assyria, and ancient Egypt, with the addition of some Anatolian influences.

== Archaeology ==
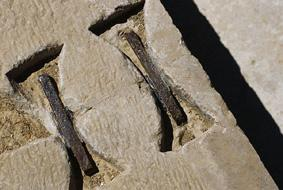
Dovetail staples from Pasargadae

The first capital of the Achaemenid Empire, Pasargadae lies in ruins 40 kilometers from Persepolis, in present-day Fars province of Iran. Gardens were of great significance in Persian culture, and the palace complex was constituted by an extensive pattern of gardens stretching from the Tomb of Cyrus to a fortress known as the Tall-i Takht, about three kilometres away, and containing various palaces and other buildings. The architecture showed elements of Elamite and Egyptian or Phoenician decoration as well as Ionian Greek building techniques, suggesting a desire by Cyrus to reflect his imperial rather than simply national kingship.

Pasargadae was first archaeologically explored by the German archaeologist Ernst Herzfeld in 1905, and in one excavation season in 1928, together with his assistant Friedrich Krefter. Since 1946, the original documents, notebooks, photographs, fragments of wall paintings and pottery from the early excavations are preserved in the Freer Gallery of Art, Smithsonian Institution, in Washington, DC. After Herzfeld, Sir Aurel Stein completed a site plan for Pasargadae in 1934. In 1935, Erich F. Schmidt produced a series of aerial photographs of the entire complex.

From 1949 to 1955, an Iranian team led by Ali Sami worked there. A British Institute of Persian Studies team led by David Stronach resumed excavation from 1961 to 1963. It was during the 1960s that a pot-hoard known as the Pasargadae Treasure was excavated near the foundations of 'Pavilion B' at the site. Dating to the 5th-4th centuries BC, the treasure consists of ornate Achaemenid jewellery made from gold and precious gems and is now housed in the National Museum of Iran and the British Museum. It has been suggested that the treasure was buried as a subsequent action once Alexander the Great approached with his army, then remained buried, hinting at violence.

After a gap, work was resumed by the Iranian Cultural Heritage Organization and the Maison de l'Orient et de la Méditerranée of the University of Lyon in 2000. This project focused on conducting geomagnetic survey's of the site, and continued until 2008. A joint Italian-Iranian team excavated at the site in 2006-2007. Likewise a French and Iranian team undertook several seasons of excavations between 20015 and 2019. The complex is one of the key cultural heritage sites for tourism in Iran.

== Sivand Dam controversy ==
There has been growing concern regarding the proposed Sivand Dam, named after the nearby town of Sivand. Despite planning that has stretched over 10 years, Iran's own Ministry of Cultural Heritage, Tourism and Handicrafts was not aware of the broader areas of flooding during much of this time.

Its placement between both the ruins of Pasargadae and Persepolis has many archaeologists and Iranians worried that the dam will flood these UNESCO World Heritage sites, although scientists involved with the construction say this is not obvious because the sites sit above the planned waterline. Of the two sites, Pasargadae is the one considered to be more threatened. Experts agree that the planning of future dam projects in Iran will merit an earlier examination of the risks to cultural resource properties.

Of broadly shared concern to archaeologists is the effect of the increase in humidity caused by the lake. All agree that the humidity created by it will speed up the destruction of Pasargadae, yet experts from the Ministry of Energy believe it could be partially compensated for by controlling the water level of the reservoir.

Construction of the dam began on 19 April 2007, with the height of the waterline limited so as to mitigate damage to the ruins.

== In popular culture ==
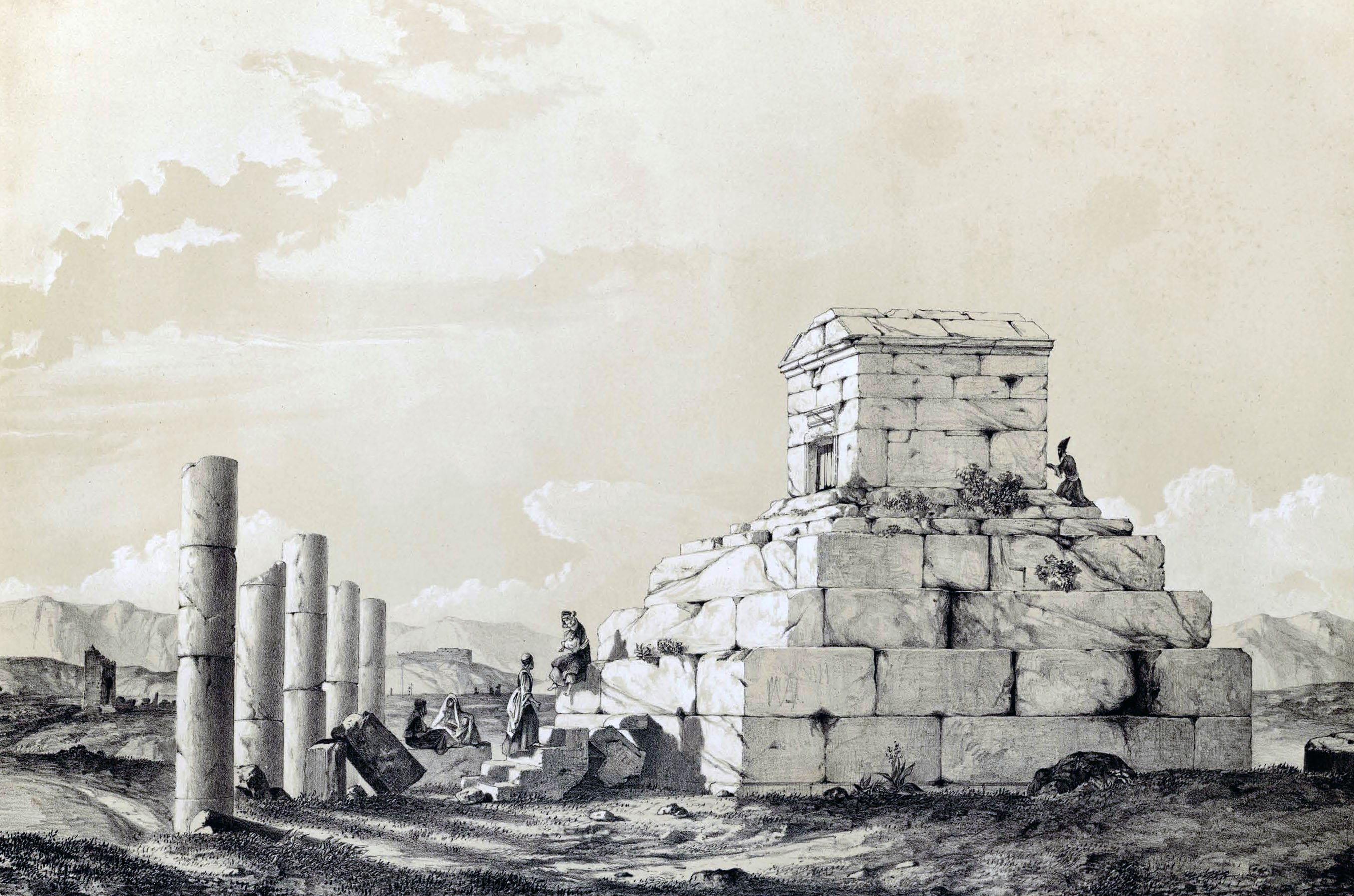
The tomb of Cyrus the Great by Eugène Flandin, 1840

In 1930, the Brazilian poet Manuel Bandeira published a poem called "Vou-me embora pra Pasárgada" ("I'm off to Pasargadae" in Portuguese), in a book entitled Libertinagem. It tells the story of a man who wants to go to Pasargadae, described in the poem as a utopian city, having the children learned in the school about this "utopic city created by Manuel Bandeira". Manuel Bandeira heard the name Pasargadae for the first time when he was 16 years old, reading a book by a Greek author. The name of the field of the Persians reminded him of good things, of a place of tranquillity and beauties. Years later, in his apartment, during a moment of sadness and anxiety, he had the idea of "vou-me embora pra Pasárgada" (I'm off to Pasargadae) and then created the poem, which surrounds the great part of the Brazilian population's imagination to this day.

== Gallery ==
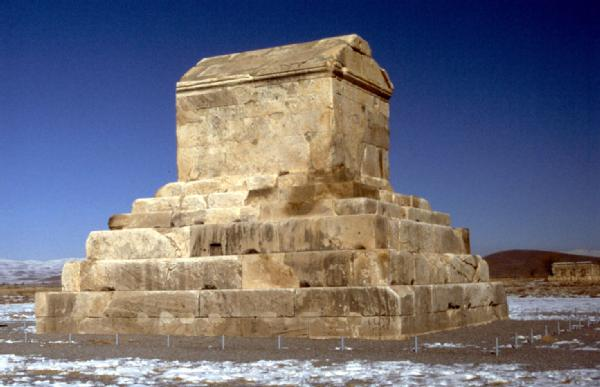
Tomb of Cyrus the Great

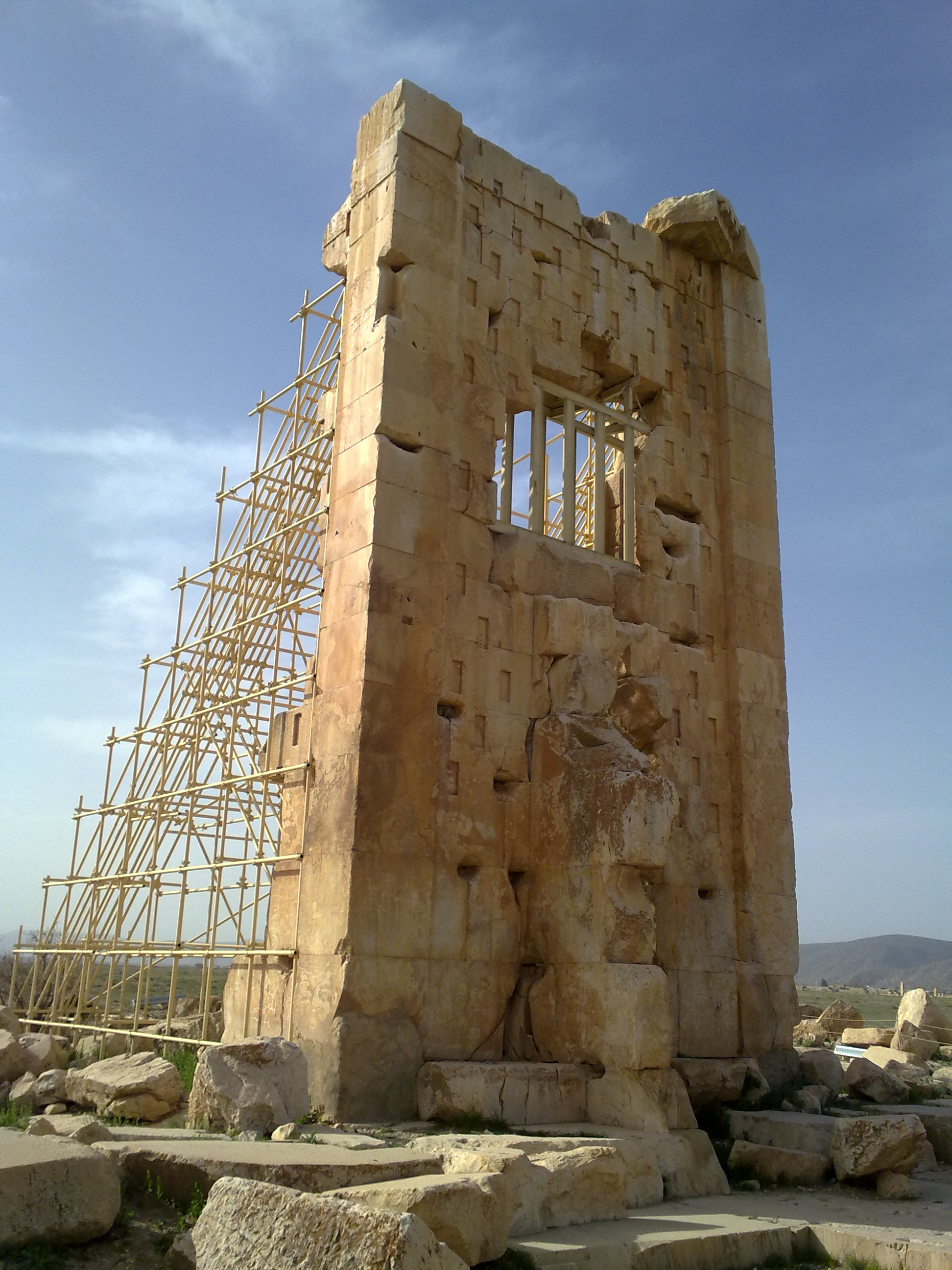
Tomb of Cambyses I

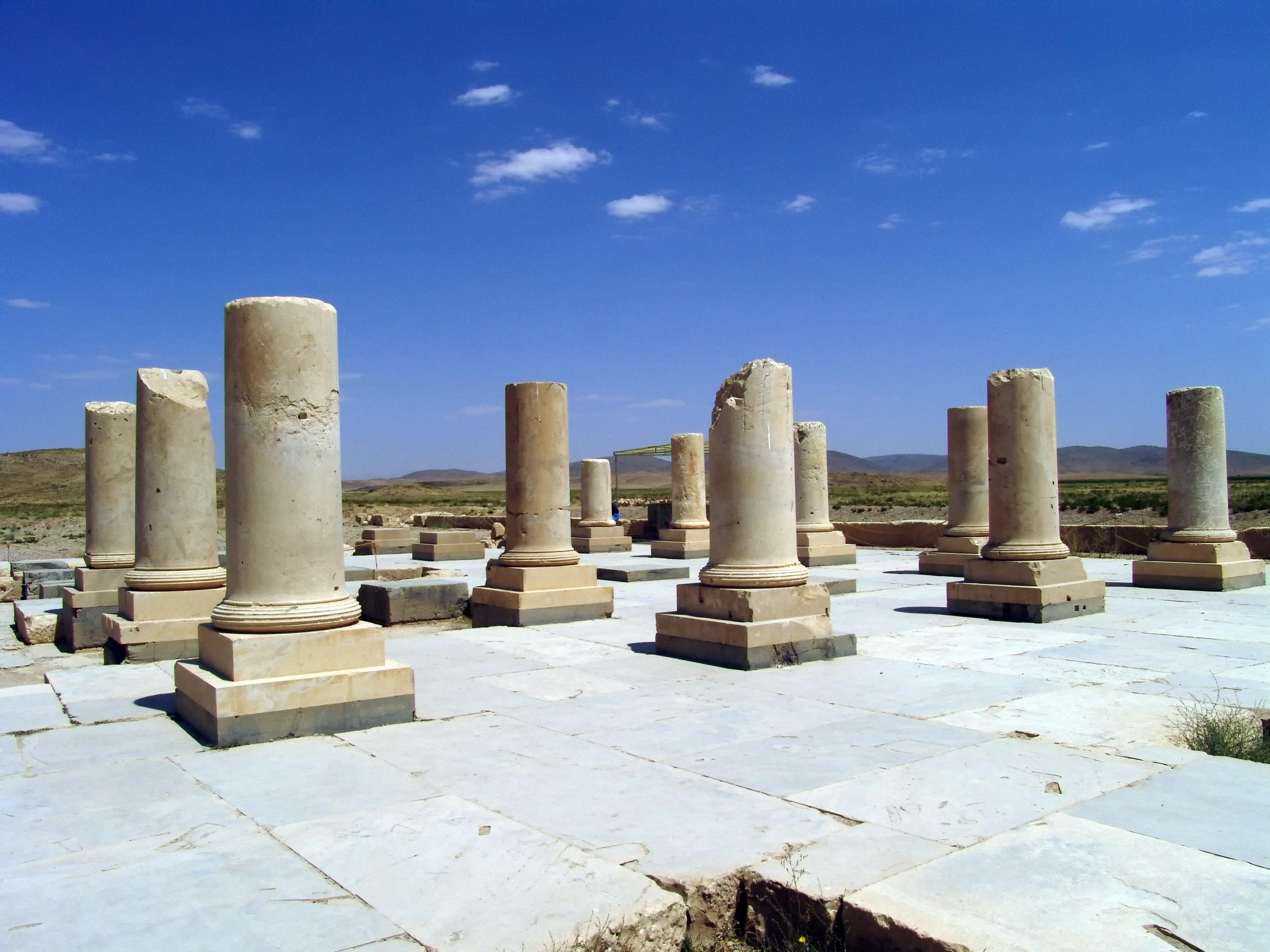
The Private Palace

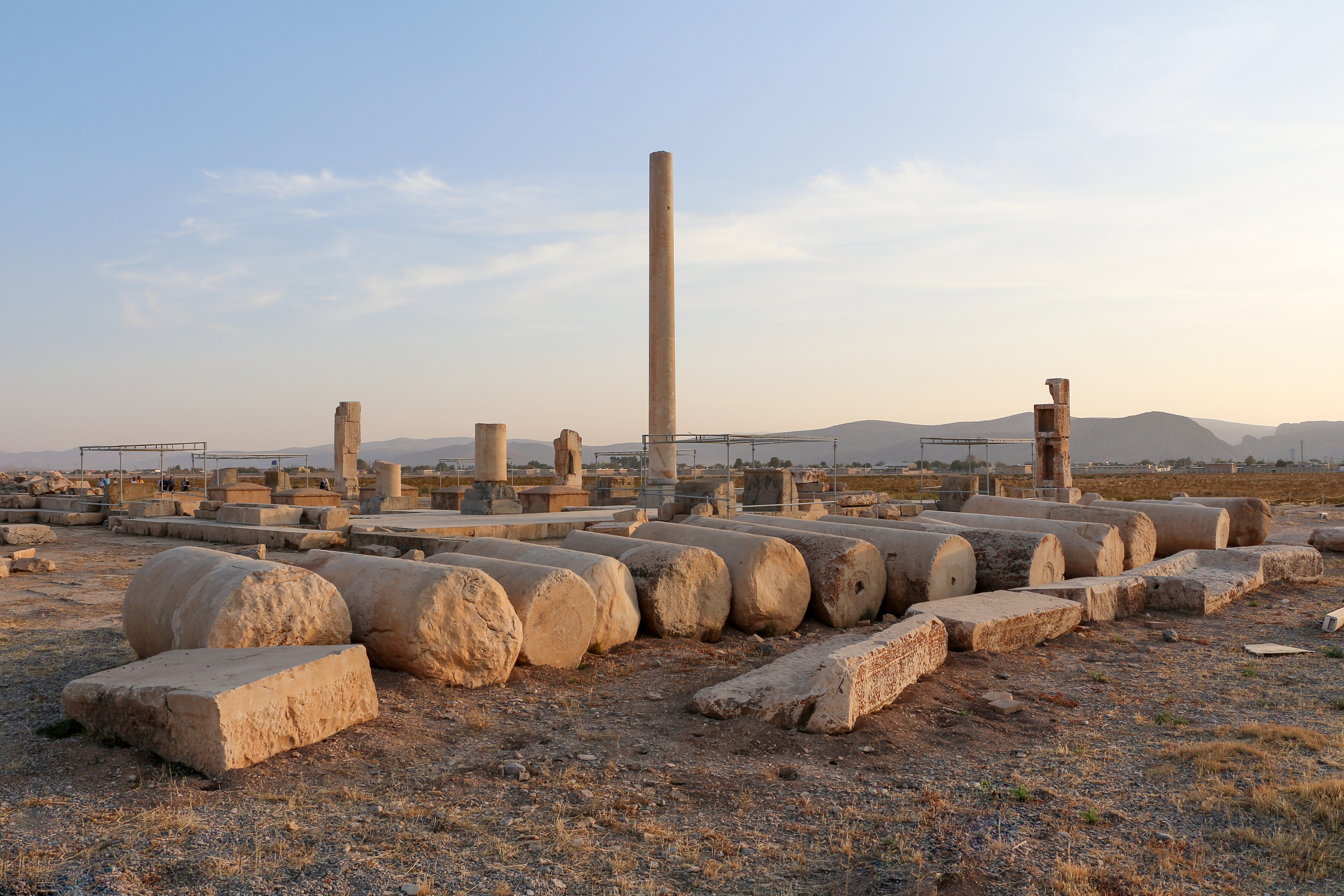
The Audience Palace

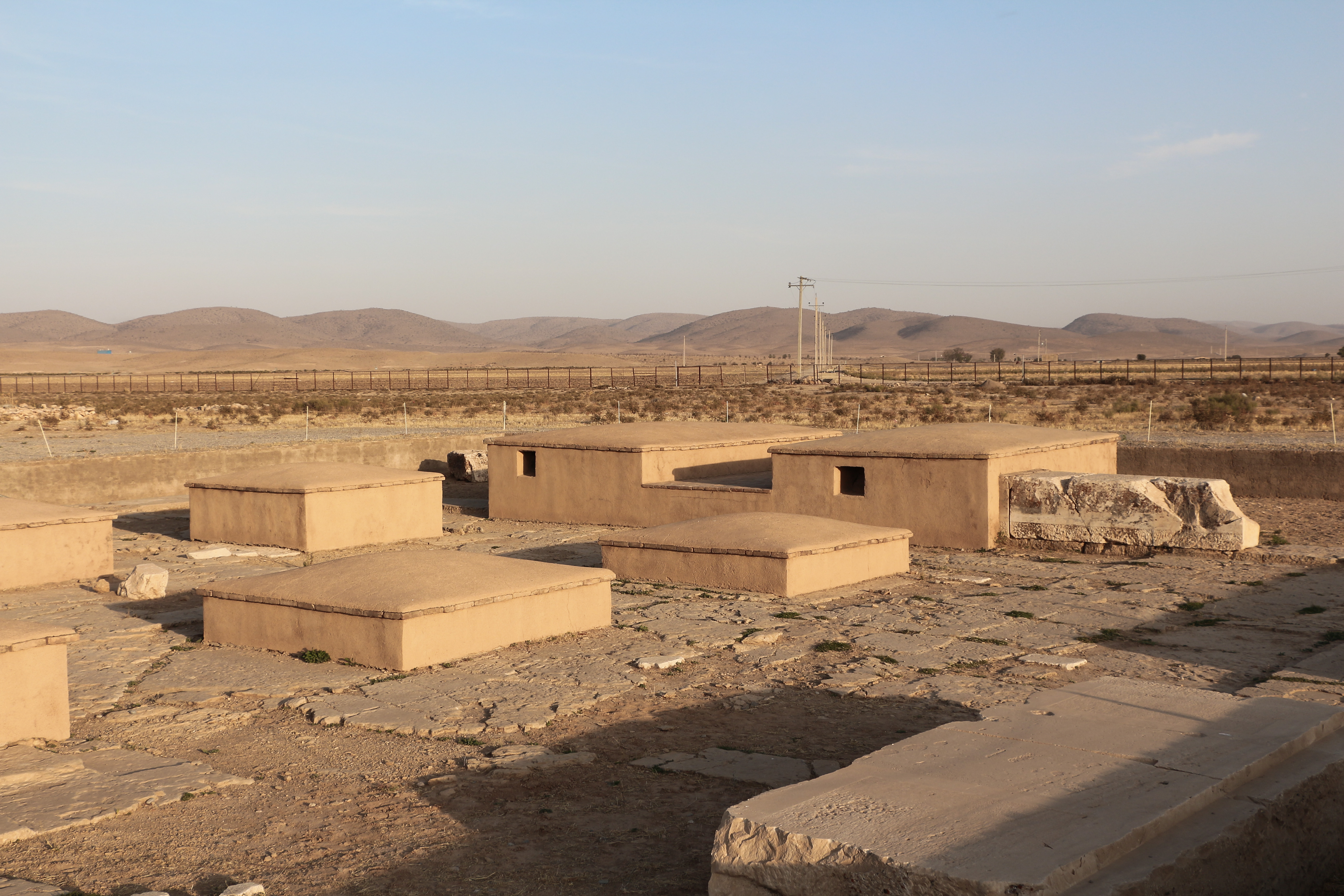
The Gateway Palace

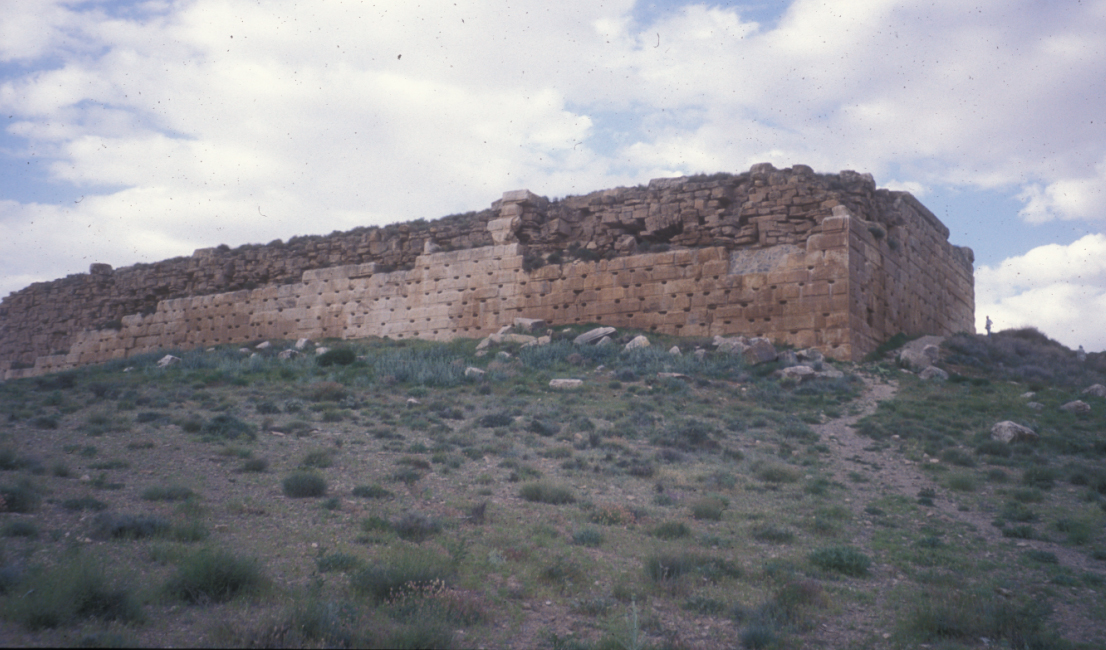
The citadel of Pasargadae. At its top many column bases indicate the structure was not unlike the Athenian Acropolis in positioning and structure.

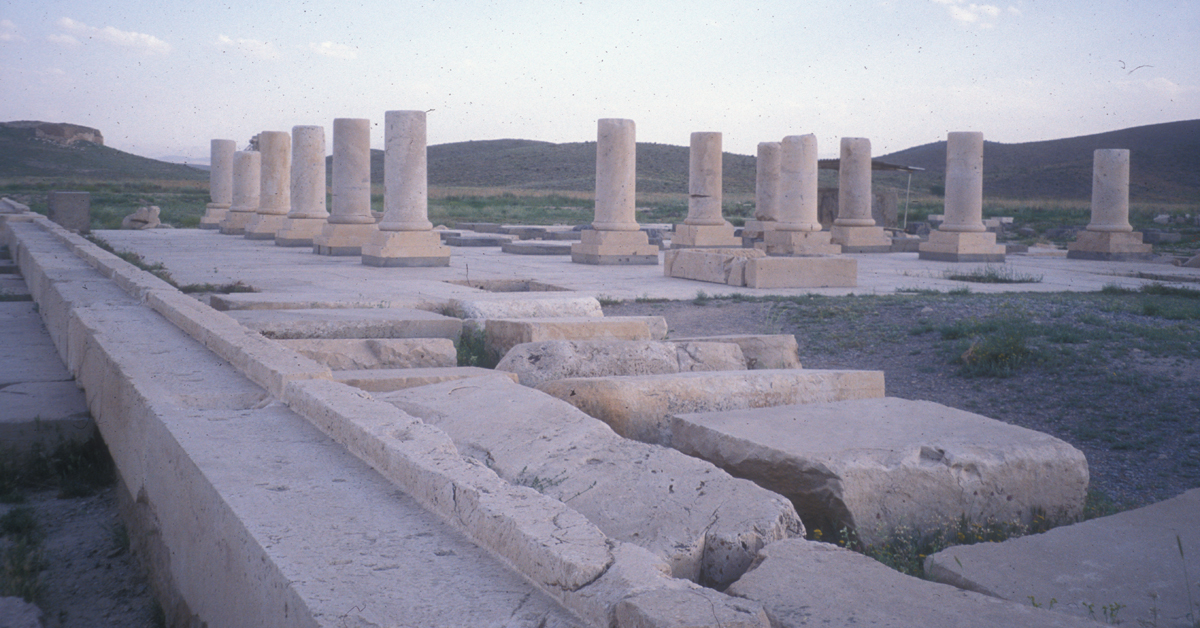
Pasargad audience hall

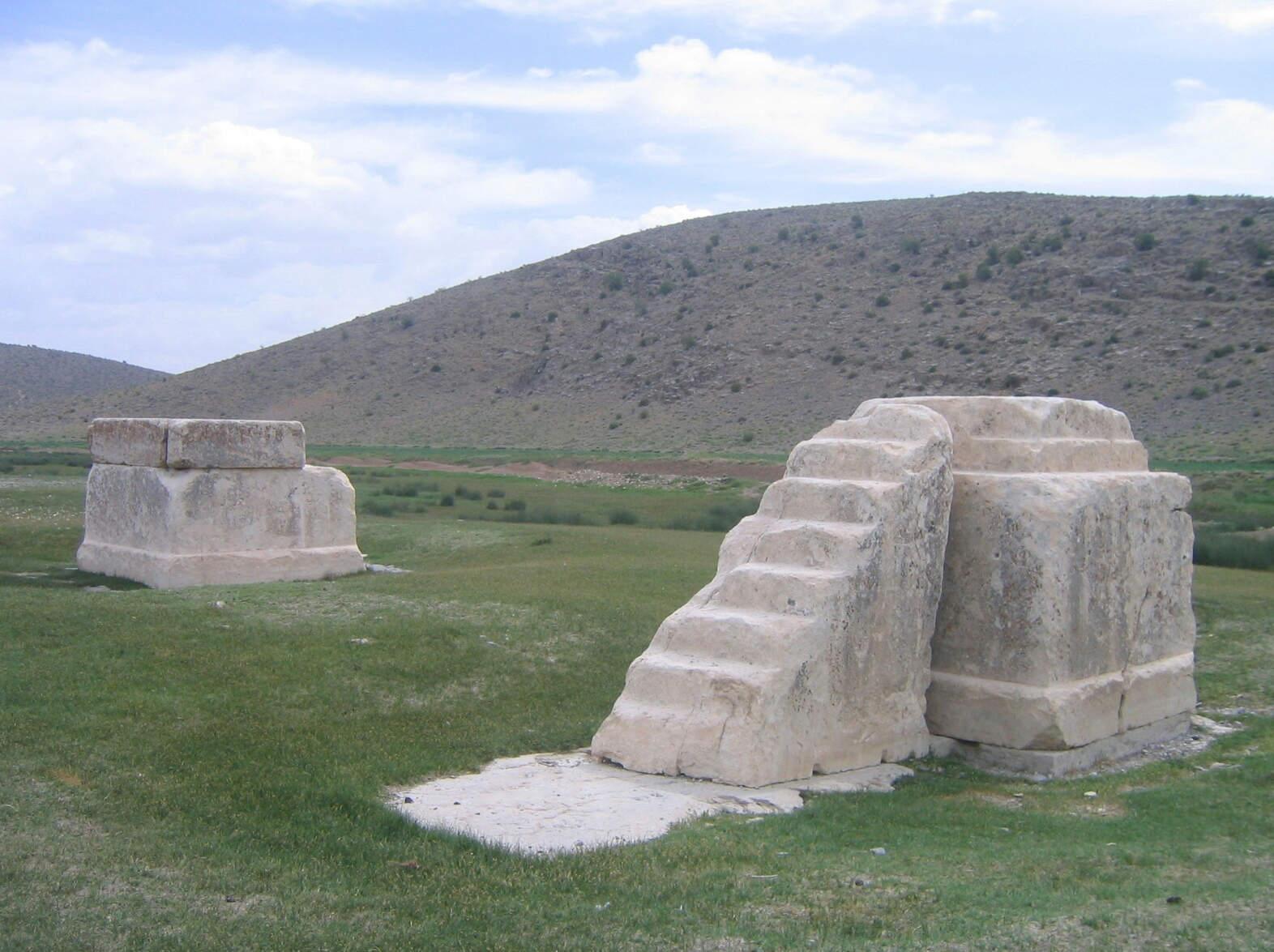
Holy area (Pasargad)

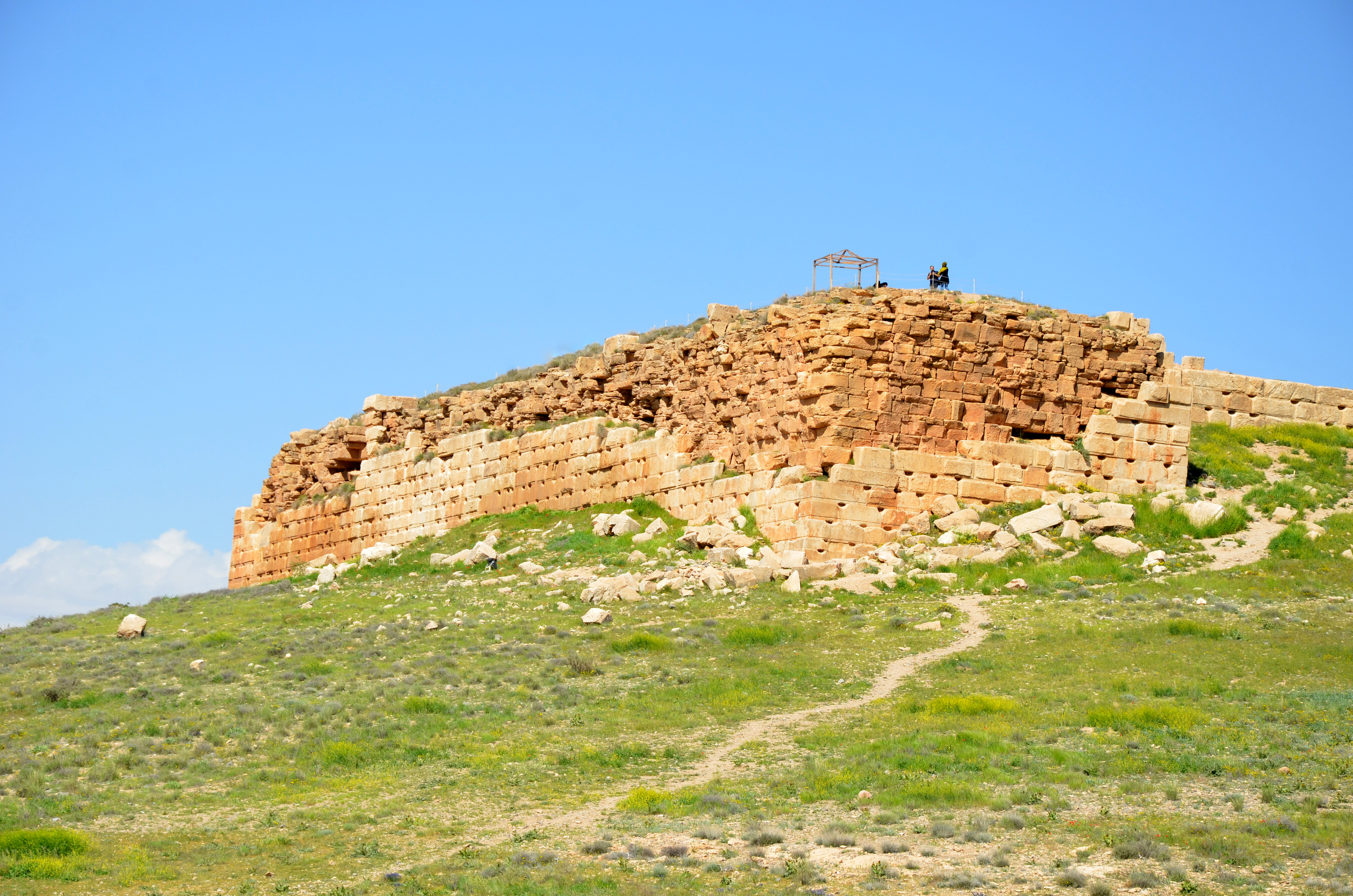
Toll-e Takht hill (Pasargad)

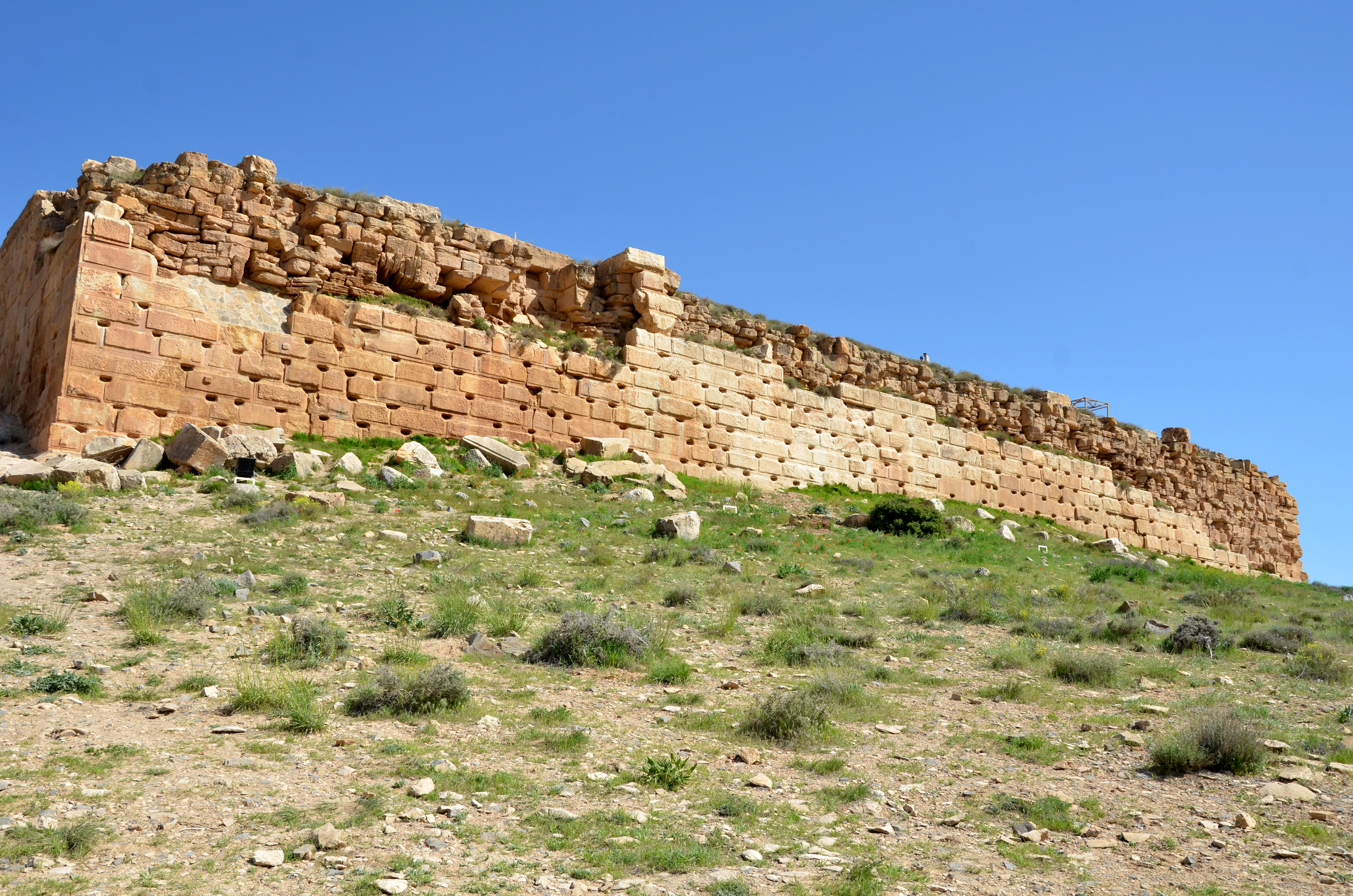
Toll-e Takht hill (Pasargad)

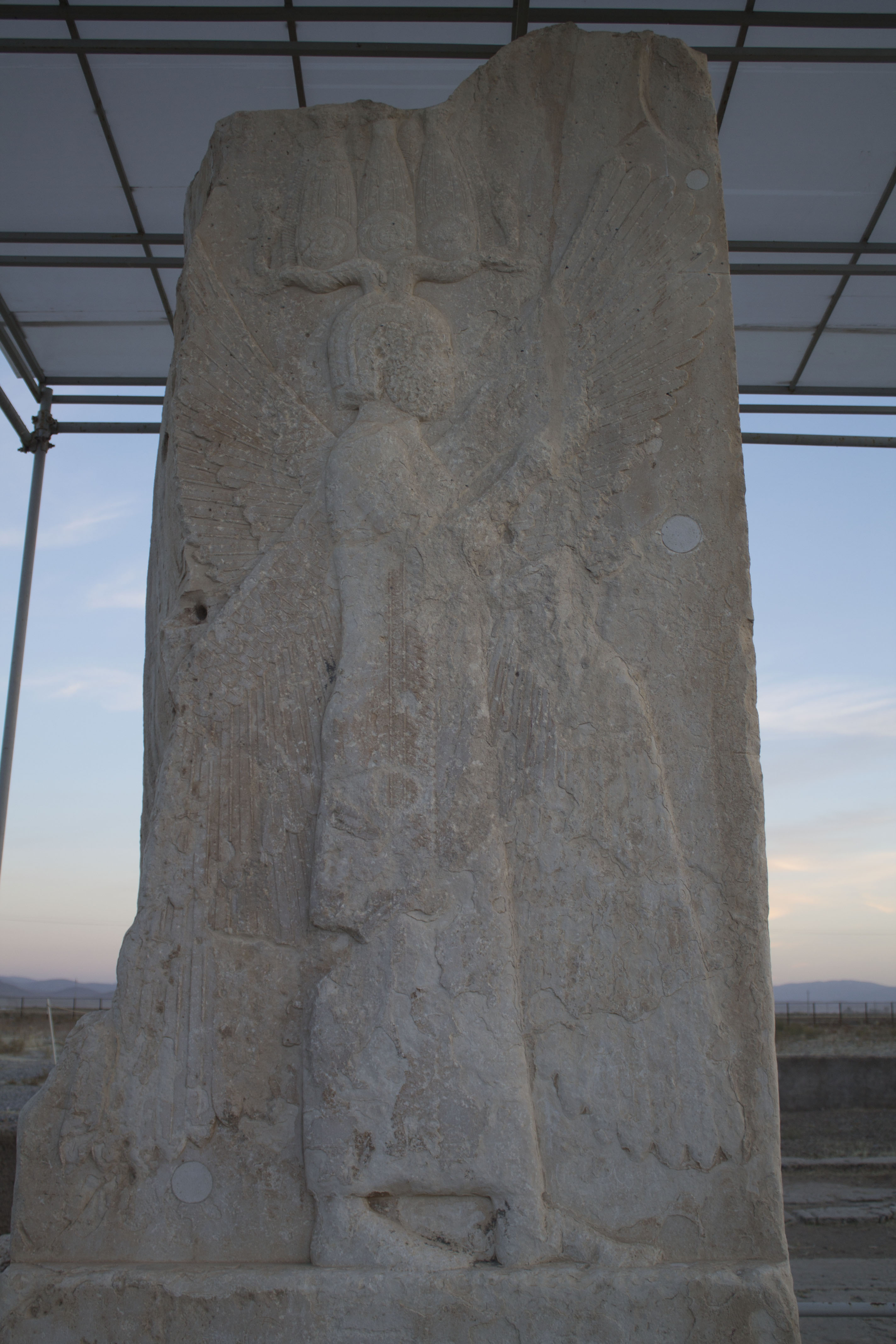
The gate of the palace with the view of the winged man

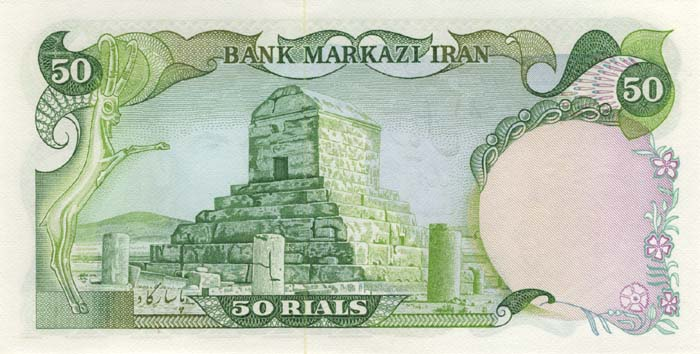
The back of the 50 riyal banknote of the Pahlavi era

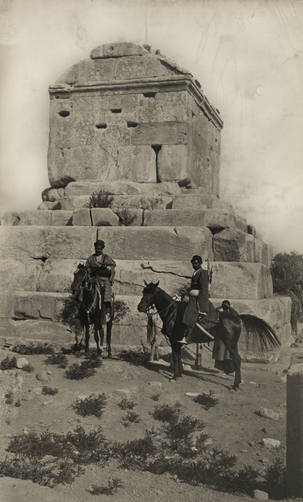
Pasargadae in the 1920s

== See also ==
- 2,500-year celebration of the Persian Empire
- Achaemenid architecture
- List of cities of the ancient Near East
- History of Iran
- Iranian architecture
- Tangeh Bolaghi
- Ka'ba-ye Zartosht, modeled after the "Prison of Solomon"

== Bibliography ==
- Sivand Dam's Inundation Postponed for 6 Months, Cultural Heritage News Agency, 29 November 2005, archived from the original on 12 March 2007.
- Fathi, Nazila (November 27, 2005), "A Rush to Excavate Ancient Iranian Sites", The New York Times; fully accessible at Fathi, Nazila (27 November 2005), "SF Gate", San Francisco Chronicle, archived from the original on April 28, 2006.
- Ali Mousavi (September 16, 2005), "Cyrus can rest in peace: Pasargadae and rumors about the dangers of Sivand Dam", History, Iranian, archived from the original on May 23, 2010.
- Pasargadae Will Never Drown, Cultural Heritage News Agency, 12 September 2005, archived from the original on 12 March 2007.
- Matheson, Sylvia A, Persia: An Archaeological Guide.
- Seffrin, André (2009), Manuel Bandeira: poesia completa e prosa, volume único [Manuel Bandeira: complete poetry and prose, unique volume], Rio de Janeiro: Editora Nova Aguilar, ISBN 978-85-210-0108-9.
- Stronach, David (1978), Pasargadae: A Report on the Excavations Conducted by the British Institute of Persian Studies from 1961–63, Oxford University Press, ISBN 978-0-19-813190-8.
- Ali Mozaffari, World Heritage in Iran: Perspectives on Pasargadae, Routledge, 2016, ISBN 978-1409448440
