= Ernst Herzfeld =

German archaeologist (1879–1948)

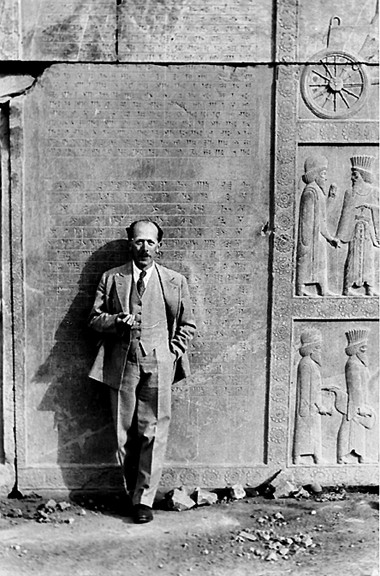
Ernst Emil Herzfeld at Persepolis, Iran

Ernst Emil Herzfeld (23 July 1879 – 20 January 1948) was a German archaeologist and Iranologist.

== Life ==
Herzfeld was born in Celle, Province of Hanover. He studied architecture in Munich and Berlin, while also taking classes in Assyriology, ancient history and art history.

From 1903 to 1905 he was assistant to Walter Andrae in the acclaimed excavations of Assur, and later traveled widely in Iraq and Iran at the beginning of the twentieth century. He surveyed and documented many historical sites in Turkey, Syria, Persia (later Iran) and most importantly in Iraq (e.g. Baghdad, Ctesiphon). At Samarra he carried out the first excavations of an Islamic period site in 1911–13.

After military service during World War I Herzfeld was appointed full professor of "Landes- und Altertumskunde des Orients" (approximately: Studies of the Ancient and modern Near East) in Berlin in 1920. This was the first professorship for Near/Middle Eastern archaeology in the world. From 1923 to 1925 he started explorations in Persia and described many of the country's most important ruins for the first time. In 1925 he moved to Tehran and stayed there most of the time until 1934. He was instrumental in creating a Persian law of antiquities and excavated in the Achaemenid capitals Pasargadae and Persepolis.

He left Iran at the end of 1934 for a year in London but never returned. In 1935 he was forced to leave his position in Germany because of his Jewish descent and became a faculty member of Princeton's Institute for Advanced Study from 1936 to 1944. He died in Basel, Switzerland in 1948.

== Archives ==
The bulk of the Ernst Herzfeld Papers are housed in the archives of the Freer Gallery of Art and the Arthur M. Sackler Gallery, Smithsonian Institution, in Washington, DC. The material, some 30,000 documents include his field notebooks, photographs, drawings and object inventories from his excavations at Samarra, Persepolis, Pasargadae and elsewhere in Iran, Iraq, Turkey and Syria. Other Herzfeld research materials, notes, photographs and drawings are at the Metropolitan Museum of Art, in the Departments of Islamic Art and Ancient Near Eastern art.

== Literary works ==
- Iranische Felsreliefs, 1910
- Archäologische Reise im Euphrat- und Tigris-Gebiet, 4 Vols., 1911–1920 (together with Friedrich Sarre)
- Paikuli, 2 Vols., 1924
- Die Ausgrabungen von Samarra, 5 Vols., 1923–1930
- Archäeologische Mitteilungen aus Iran (Berlin: Reimer, 1929–30)
- Archaeological History of Iran, Schweich Lectures for 1934 (London: Milford, 1934)
- Altpersische Inschriften, 1938
- Iran in the ancient East, 1940
- Zoroaster and his World, 2 Vols., 1947

== See also ==
- Iranology
