= Sivand =

Sivand سيوند
- Village
- Location within Iran
- Coordinates: 30°04′48″N 52°55′22″E
- Country: Iran
- Province: Fars
- County: Marvdasht
- Bakhsh: Seyyedan
- Rural District: Khafrak-e Olya

Population (2006)
  - Total: 3,130
- Time zone: UTC+3:30 (IRST)
  - Summer (DST): UTC+4:30 (IRDT)

Sivand (Persian: سيوند, also Romanized as Sīvand) is a village in Khafrak-e Olya, Marvdasht County, Fars province, Iran. It is located in the Sivand valley and is mostly known for the nearby Sivand Dam. At the 2006 census, its population was 3,130, in 861 families.

Sivand has a warm climate and contains vast pastures. It has relatively dry winters with some occasional snowfall. Sivand is home to the Sivandi dialect, a north western -Iranian language which like an island is surrounded in a sea of other Persian languages and dialects in Fars. The number of Sivandi speakers is estimated to be approximately 6,800 persons. The population of Sivand decreased from some 6,000 in 1950 to its present total, as a result of most of its young population leaving for cities in pursuit of higher education; some Sivandis also emigrated, mostly to Europe and the United States. Most of Sivand's present inhabitants are involved in horticulture and farming.
