= Sivand Dam =

Dam in Fars, Iran

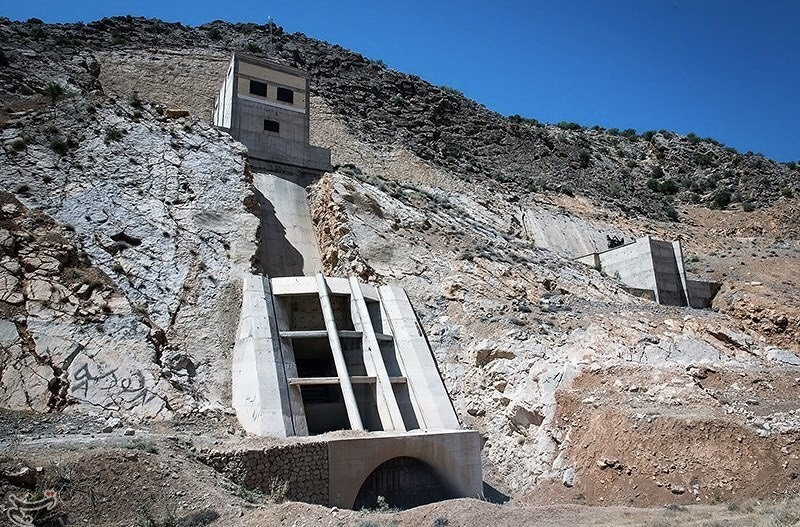

- Location within Iran
- Official name: سد سیوند
- Country: Iran
- Location: Sivand, Fars province
- Coordinates: 30.158°N 53.111°E
- Purpose: Irrigation
- Status: Active
- Construction began: 1992 (reactivated 2003)
- Opening date: 2007
- Built by: Iranian Ministry of Energy

Dam and spillways
- Type of dam: Earth-fill embankment
- Impounds: Polvar River

Reservoir
- Creates: Sivand Reservoir
- Total capacity: 255,000,000 m³
- Surface area: 11 km²

Sivand Dam (Persian: سد سیوند) is a dam built in 2007 in Fars province, Iran. Named after the nearby town of Sivand located northwest of Shiraz, it was the center of worldwide concern because of the flooding it would cause in historical and archaeologically rich areas of Ancient Persia and possible harm it may cause to the nearby UNESCO World Heritage Sites of Persepolis and Pasargadae.

== Planning and history ==
The Iranian government planned the Sivand Dam for over 10 years, with a location on the Polvar River in the Tangeh Bolaghi (Bolaghi Gorge) between the ruins of Persepolis and Pasargadae. Intended to allow irrigation in the arid region, the planning and initial site construction began in 1992, then was stopped for further planning and was reactivated in 2003.

For the first decade, much of the planning was not made public; Iran's own Iranian Cultural Heritage Organization (ICHO) was not aware of the total area of flooding until 2003. When the intentions for the dam were made public, international concern was raised regarding damage to any archaeological sites, particularly the two World Heritage Sites. Rumors spread that the dam would place the two ruins under water, spurring outcry and petitions from concerned experts and individuals. Scientists with the dam project dismissed the rumors outright, and Iranian officials pointed some blame for the rumors on the political opposition parties from outside Iran. Iranian Ministry of Energy studies have placed the furthest reaches of the lake approximately 7 kilometers south of the plain of Murqab; that is 9 kilometers from Pasargadae and more than 70 kilometers from Persepolis.

However, Iranian officials from the Ministry of Energy and ICHO did acknowledge that the lake will flood 130 Persian archeological sites and invited international teams to help excavate the area before construction commenced. In 2004, the United Nations issued an urgent international appeal for archaeologists to join the domestic effort to unearth and record what they could before the flooding. Teams from Germany, France, Italy, Japan, Poland, and the United States responded to the request for help.

One consequence of the dam's construction was an opportunity for extensive archaeological work in a historically rich area in a short amount of time. The oldest sites the international teams found were caves inhabited about 7,000 years ago. The archaeologists uncovered a narrow 9-mile dirt road believed to be the Royal Passage of the Achaemenids, connecting the two ancient cities, which was in use until the 18th century.

The archaeological work caused the construction schedule of Sivand Dam to be pushed back. The area was originally supposed to be flooded by the end of February 2006, but the discovery of an Achaemenid-era village and cemetery caused it to be delayed.

== Potential effects on Pasargadae ==
Besides the flooding of 130 archaeological sites, a larger concern has been raised about the dam's effect on nearby World Heritage Sites, particularly Pasargadae, an ancient capital of the Persian Empire built by Cyrus the Great and the site of his tomb.

Experts involved with planning the dam deny this claim, noting that the site is well above and away from the eventual waterline. However, it is unknown how the dampness caused by the dam will affect the ruins. Archaeologists and scientists agree that the rise in humidity from the new lake will speed up the destruction of Pasargadae to some degree. Although no preliminary environmental research has been carried out to assess the effects of humidity upon the constructions at Pasargadae, the Ministry of Energy believes it could be compensated by controlling the water level of the dam reservoir.

In 2010, studies of the Pasargadae showed that groundwater levels in the area had risen as a result of the dam and lake. The higher groundwater levels and increased humidity were said to be directly affecting foundation failures and the formation of newer cracks in walls and platforms throughout the ruins.

== Completion ==
Sivand Dam was completed in 2007, but the height of the lake behind it was delimited so that it would not harm the site of Cyrus the Great's Mausoleum. Dr. Shahriar Adl was active in preserving the site.

== See also ==
- Three Gorges Dam
- Dams in Iran

== Bibliography ==
- Date of Sivand Dam Inundation Not Yet Agreed Upon, Cultural Heritage News Agency, 29 May 2006, Accessed Sept. 15, 2006.
- Sivand Dam Waits for Excavations to be Finished, Cultural Heritage News Agency, 26 February 2006, Accessed Sept. 15, 2006.
- Sivand Dam’s Inundation Postponed for 6 Months, Cultural Heritage News Agency, 29 November 2005, Accessed Sept. 15, 2006.
- Nazila Fathi, A Rush to Excavate Ancient Iranian Sites, The New York Times, November 27, 2005; also accessible in full here.
- Ali Mousavi, Cyrus can rest in peace: Pasargadae and rumors about the dangers of Sivand Dam, Iranian.com, September 16, 2005
- Pasargadae Will Never Drown, Cultural Heritage News Agency, 12 September 2005, Accessed Sept. 15, 2006.
- Rémy Boucharlat, News from Pasargadae, ANE: DISCUSSION LIST FOR THE STUDY OF THE ANCIENT NEAR EAST, University of Chicago listserv, 29 Dec 2004, Accessed Sept. 15, 2006 (Boucharlat is now the head of the French archaeological team in the region).
- Ancient Pasargadae threatened by construction of dam, Mehr News Agency, 28 August 2004, Accessed Sept. 15, 2006
