= Mirik (disambiguation) =

Mirik is a town in West Bengal, India.

Mirik may also refer to:

== Places ==
- Mirik, Azerbaijan
- Mirik, Iran
- Mirik Lake, a lake in the town of Mirik, West Bengal
- Mirik subdivision, a subdivision of Darjeeling district, West Bengal
- Mirik (community development block), administrative block of Mirik, West Bengal

== Food ==
- Mirik meatball, a Turkish meatball recipe

== People ==
- Mirik Milan, a former Amsterdam Night Mayor
