= Rahneshk =

Rahneshk may refer to:

- Rahnishk
- Rahnich
