= Bidokht (disambiguation) =

Bidokht is a city in Razavi Khorasan Province, Iran.

Bidokht (Persian: بيدخت) may also refer to:

- Bidokht, Birjand, a village in Birjand County, South Khorasan Province, Iran
- Bidokht, Khusf, a village in Khusf County, South Khorasan Province, Iran
- Bidokht, Zirkuh, a village in Zirkuh County, South Khorasan Province, Iran
