= Soureni =

- Village
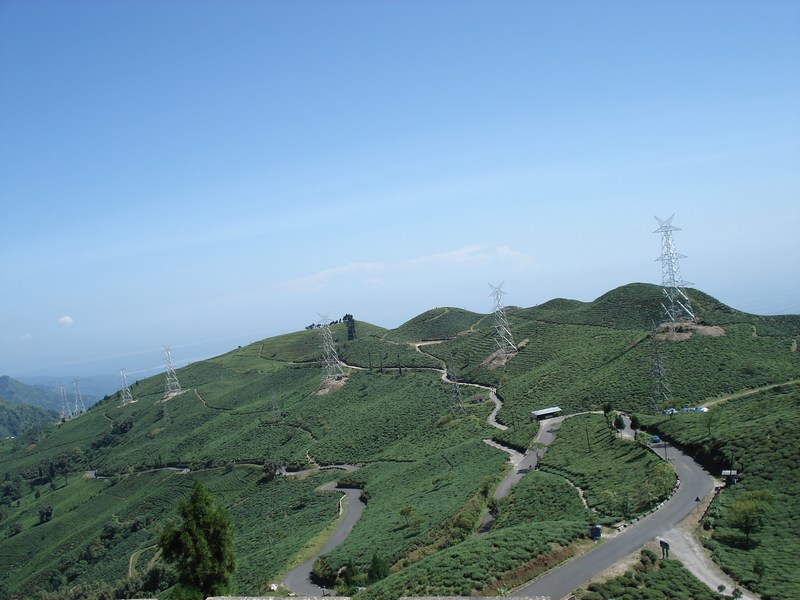
- Soureni-Tingling Viewpoint

- Location in West Bengal, India Soureni (India)
- Coordinates: 26.8574°N 88.2037°E
- Country: India
- State: West Bengal
- District: Darjeeling
- Elevation: 1,330 m (4,360 ft)

Languages
  - Official: Nepali, English
- Time zone: UTC+5:30 (IST)
- PIN: 734227
- Telephone code: 91 35422
- Website: darjeeling.gov.in

Soureni is a village in the Mirik CD block in the Mirik subdivision of the Darjeeling district, in West Bengal, India.

== History ==
Dakman Rai, the famous Nepali sardar (landlord), was given large tracts of land by the British during the establishment of tea gardens in Darjeeling. These included Soureni, Phuguri and Samripani. Bhoujit Rai, son of Dakman Rai, established a tea garden in Soureni by planting a tree variety called "Saur" and some tea on this personal estate. He later sold off the estate to the Tiwari brothers, Ramlal and Jalooram Tiwari, who had come from Rajasthan to Darjeeling in 1870 and had established a shop in Kurseong of which Bhoujit was a customer. The Soureni Tea Estate was formally established in 1902 by the Tiwari brothers. The Soureni Tea Estate was sold off by the Tiwaris in 1990. It is presently owned by Titagarh Wagons Ltd. Enormous contribution was made by Mr. Lingwood to the development of Soureni, including the establishment of its first high school.

== Geography ==
Places and tea estates in the southern portion of Darjeeling Sadar subdivision (including Jorebunglow Sukhiapokhri CD block), and Mirik Subdivision in Darjeeling district
CT: census town, R: rural/ urban centre, NP: national park/ wildlife sanctuary, TE: tea estate
Abbreviations used in names – TG for Tea Garden (town/village), TE for Tea Estate
Owing to space constraints in the small map, the actual locations in a larger map may vary slightly

=== Area overview ===
The map alongside shows a part of the southern portion of the Darjeeling Himalayan hill region in the Darjeeling district. In the Darjeeling Sadar subdivision 61.00% of the total population lives in the rural areas and 39.00% of the population lives in the urban areas. In the Mirik subdivision 80.11% of the total population lives in the rural areas and 19.89% lives in the urban areas. There are 78 tea gardens/ estates (the figure varies slightly according to different sources), in the district, producing and largely exporting Darjeeling tea. It engages a large proportion of the population directly/ indirectly. Some tea gardens were identified in the 2011 census as census towns or villages. Such places are marked in the map as CT (census town) or R (rural/ urban centre). Specific tea estate pages are marked TE.

Note: The map alongside presents some of the notable locations in the subdivision. All places marked in the map are linked in the larger full screen map.

=== Location ===
Soureni is a village near Mirik in Darjeeling district, West Bengal, India. The market of Soureni Bazar caters to several villages and tea gardens of the surrounding area. There are two tea estates near Soureni Bazar – Soureni Tea Estate and Mechi Tea Estate. Soureni has a huge potential for tourism with numerous scenic spots. It lies on the alternate Darjeeling-Siliguri road, about 7 km from Mirik.

=== Climate ===
Soureni has a cool and pleasant climate with maximum temperatures of 32 °C in summer and a minimum of 9 °C in winter.

=== Places of interest ===
- Soureni-Tingling Viewpoint – One of the best viewpoint in the entire North-East India with a meandering road amidst the green slopes of the tea gardens.
- Hallaney – The views from both sides of this ridge road show Kurseong and the plains of North Bengal on the one side and the hills of Nepal, with the well-known Antu Dara, on the other.
- Bunkulung (Jayanti Nagar) – A developing commercial and agricultural village in the valley near the Balasan river. Ecotourism and home-stay facilities are being promoted in this area.
- Soureni Busty – Numerous orange orchards lie in this area.
- Tea Gardens – Soureni Tea Estate, Mechi Tea Estate, Phuguri Tea Estate, Tingling Tea Estate, Singbulli Tea Estate, Ghayabaree and Millikthong Tea Estates.

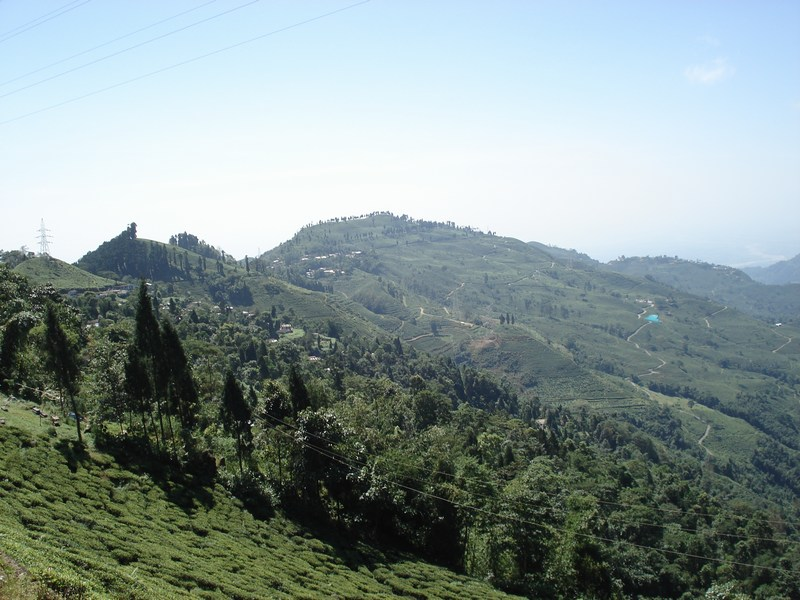
View of Soureni from Hallaney

=== Travel ===
- Nearest towns: Mirik (7 km), Darjeeling (49 km), Siliguri (52 km)
- Nearest railway station: New Jalpaiguri (60 km)
- Nearest airport: Bagdogra (55 km)

== Demographics ==
According to the 2011 Census of India, Saurinibasti had a total population of 3,901 of which 1,993 (51%) were males and 1,908 (49%) were females. There were 304 persons in the age range of 0 to 6 years. The total number of literate people in Saurinibasti was 3,151 (80.77% of the population over 6 years).

== Education ==
=== CISCE affiliated ===
- Green Lawn School (English medium) ICSE & ISC
- Pine Hall Academy (English medium) ICSE
- Temple of Wisdom (English medium) ICSE

=== WBBSE and WBCHSe affiliated ===
- Rabindranath High School (Nepali medium) Madhyamik and WBHS

== Healthcare ==
There is a primary health centre with 10 beds, at Sourani Bustee.
