= Okayti Tea Estate =

Tea garden in West Bengal, India

- Interactive map of Okayti Tea Estate
- Coordinates: 26.902444°N 88.160611°E
- Area: 1,600 acres (650 ha)
- Elevation: 4,000 to 6,200 feet (1,200 to 1,900 m)
- Owner: Mr. Rajeev Baid
- Open: 1870s
- Website: www.okaytitea.com

Okayti Tea Estate is a tea garden in the Mirik CD block in the Mirik subdivision of the Darjeeling district in the Indian state of West Bengal.

== History ==
Rangdoo was the original name of this tea estate. It was planted by the British planters in the 1870s. The tea produced at Rangdoo had a distinctive taste because of the soil and agro-climatic conditions. It soon earned the reputation of being the only ‘’Okay tea’’. So powerful was the impact of the market feed-back that the tea garden was renamed Okayti Tea Estate. The tea factory was built in 1888.

The Kumbhat family has been nurturing the estate for over two decades.

Recently Mr. Rajeev Baid, Founder of Evergreen Group acquired Okayti Tea Estate.

== Geography ==
Places and tea estates in the southern portion of Darjeeling Sadar subdivision (including Jorebunglow Sukhiapokhri CD block), and Mirik Subdivision in Darjeeling district
CT: census town, R: rural/ urban centre, NP: national park/ wildlife sanctuary, TE: tea estate
Abbreviations used in names – TG for Tea Garden (town/village), TE for Tea Estate
Owing to space constraints in the small map, the actual locations in a larger map may vary slightly

Okayti Tea Estate is in the Mirik Valley about 45 km from Darjeeling. It has Gopaldhara Tea Estate on the north-east and Thurbo Tea Estate on the east. Tea bushes are planted in an area covering 208.82 hectares (516.0 acres) out of the total area of 647.49 hectares (1,600.0 acres). The balance area includes forest covering. Tea is grown at a height of 4,000 to 6,200 feet (1,200 to 1,900 m).

The Mechi, forming the boundary between India and Nepal, flows along the boundaries of the tea garden.

Note: The map alongside presents some of the notable locations in the subdivision. All places marked in the map are linked in the larger full screen map.

== Economy ==
Okayti produces round 140,000 kg of tea annually, most of which is exported to the US, Europe and Japan.

== Achievements ==
Darjeeling tea produced by Okayti is certified to be 100% bio-organic. Among those who have patronised Okayti are Queen Elizabeth, Nikita Khrushchev and Jawaharlal Nehru.
