= Khazan =

Village in South Khorasan province, Iran

Khazan Persian: خزان
- Village
- Location within Iran
- Coordinates: 33°22′35″N 59°29′30″E
- Country: Iran
- Province: South Khorasan
- County: Birjand
- District: Shakhenat
- Rural District: Shakhen

Population (2016)
  - Total: 273
- Time zone: UTC+3:30 (IRST)

Khazan (Persian: خزان) (Note: Also romanized as Khazān; also known as Khīzu) is a village in Shakhen Rural District of Shakhenat District in Birjand County, South Khorasan province, Iran.

== Demographics ==
=== Population ===
At the time of the 2006 National Census, the village's population was 457 in 114 households, when it was in the Central District. The following census in 2011 counted 324 people in 95 households. The 2016 census measured the population of the village as 273 people in 98 households.

In 2021, the rural district was separated from the district in the formation of Shakhenat District.
