= Mobarakabad, South Khorasan =

Village in South Khorasan province, Iran

Mobarakabad Persian: مبارك اباد
- Village
- Location within Iran
- Coordinates: 33°23′10″N 59°30′19″E
- Country: Iran
- Province: South Khorasan
- County: Birjand
- District: Shakhenat
- Rural District: Shakhen

Population (2016)
  - Total: 460
- Time zone: UTC+3:30 (IRST)

Mobarakabad (Persian: مبارک‌آباد) (Note: Also romanized as Mobārakābād; also known as Mālekābād (مالک‌آباد) and Malikābād) is a village in Shakhen Rural District of Shakhenat District in Birjand County, South Khorasan province, Iran.

== Demographics ==
=== Population ===
At the time of the 2006 National Census, the village's population was 570 in 138 households, when it was in the Central District. The following census in 2011 counted 528 people in 140 households. The 2016 census measured the population of the village as 460 people in 129 households.

In 2021, the rural district was separated from the district in the formation of Shakhenat District.
