= Shur Ab, Birjand =

Village in South Khorasan province, Iran

Shur Ab Persian: شوراب
- Village
- Location within Iran
- Coordinates: 33°24′45″N 59°28′10″E
- Country: Iran
- Province: South Khorasan
- County: Birjand
- District: Shakhenat
- Rural District: Shakhen

Population (2016)
  - Total: 69
- Time zone: UTC+3:30 (IRST)

Shur Ab (Persian: شوراب) (Note: Also romanized as Shūr Āb) is a village in Shakhen Rural District of Shakhenat District in Birjand County, South Khorasan province, Iran.

== Demographics ==
=== Population ===
At the time of the 2006 National Census, the village's population was 168 in 51 households, when it was in the Central District. The following census in 2011 counted 129 people in 47 households. The 2016 census measured the population of the village as 69 people in 29 households.

In 2021, the rural district was separated from the district in the formation of Shakhenat District.
