= Sarqan-e Sofla =

Village in South Khorasan province, Iran

Sarqan-e Sofla Persian: سرقان سفلی
- Village
- Location within Iran
- Coordinates: 33°18′40″N 59°36′28″E
- Country: Iran
- Province: South Khorasan
- County: Birjand
- District: Shakhenat
- Rural District: Shakhen

Population (2016)
  - Total: 21
- Time zone: UTC+3:30 (IRST)

Sarqan-e Sofla (Persian: سرقان سفلی) (Note: Also romanized as Sārqān-e Soflá; also known as Sārgān Pā’īn, Sarqān, Sārqān-e Pā’īn, and Shargu) is a village in Shakhen Rural District of Shakhenat District in Birjand County, South Khorasan province, Iran.

== Demographics ==
=== Population ===
At the time of the 2006 National Census, the village's population was 53 in 16 households, when it was in the Central District. The following census in 2011 counted 21 people in 10 households. The 2016 census measured the population of the village as 21 people in eight households.

In 2021, the rural district was separated from the district in the formation of Shakhenat District.
