= Varqaneh =

Village in South Khorasan province, Iran

Varqaneh Persian: ورقنه
- Village
- Location within Iran
- Coordinates: 33°19′23″N 59°29′36″E
- Country: Iran
- Province: South Khorasan
- County: Birjand
- District: Shakhenat
- Rural District: Shakhenat

Population (2016)
  - Total: 96
- Time zone: UTC+3:30 (IRST)

Varqaneh (Persian: ورقنه) (Note: Also known as Varghāneh and Warghaneh) is a village in Shakhenat Rural District of Shakhenat District in Birjand County, South Khorasan province, Iran.

== Demographics ==
=== Population ===
At the time of the 2006 National Census, the village's population was 128 in 39 households, when it was in the Central District. The following census in 2011 counted 102 people in 38 households. The 2016 census measured the population of the village as 96 people in 38 households.

In 2021, the rural district was separated from the district in the formation of Shakhenat District.
