= Gopaldhara Tea Estate =

Tea garden in West Bengal, India

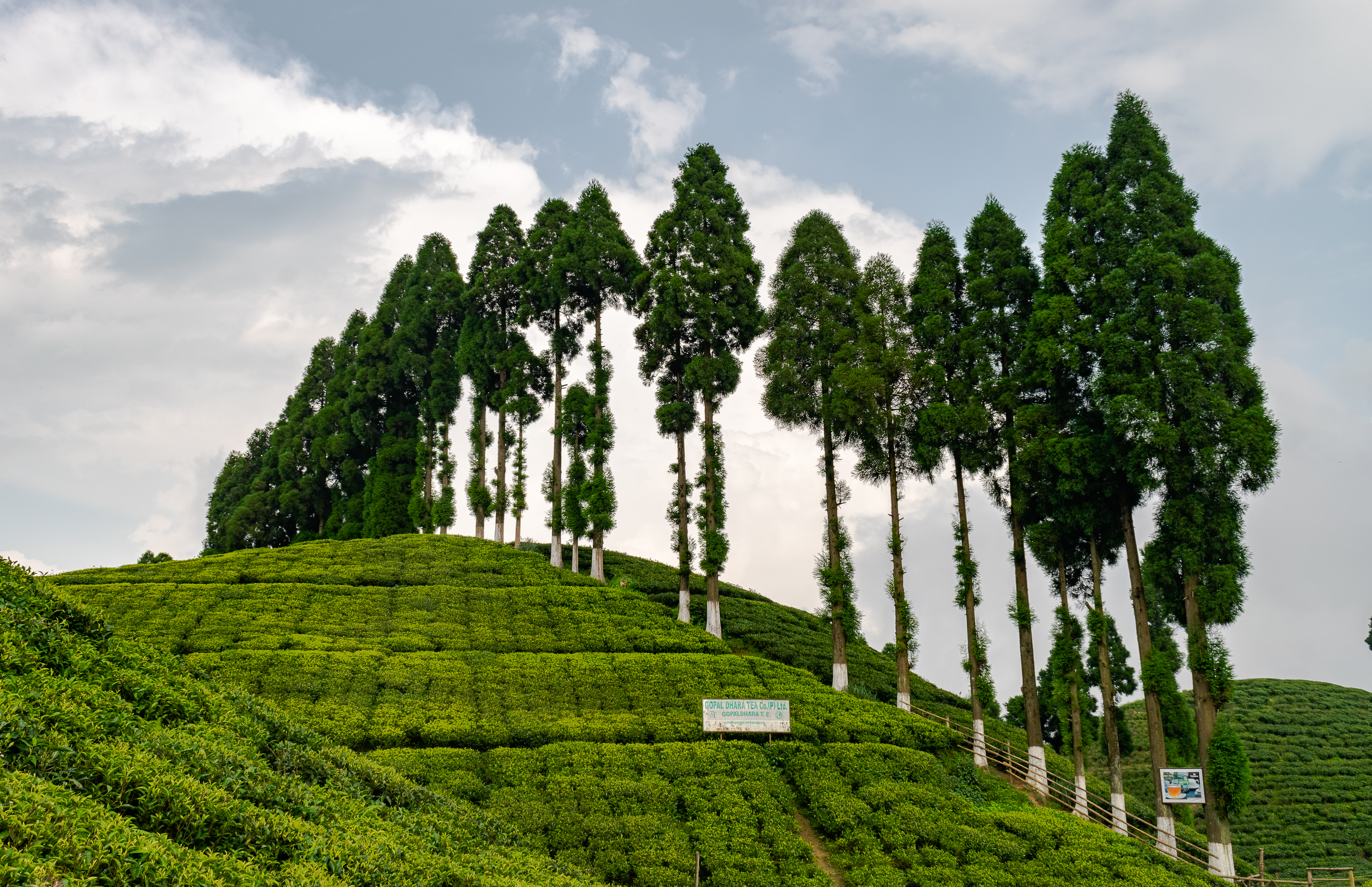
- Gopal Dhara Tea Estate
- Interactive map of Gopaldhara Tea Estate
- Location: Darjeeling district, West Bengal, India
- Coordinates: 26.923435°N 88.162343°E
- Area: 320 ha (790 acres)
- Elevation: 5,500 to 7,000 feet (1,700 to 2,100 m)
- Owner: Sona Tea Group
- Open: 1881

Gopaldhara Tea Estate is a tea garden in the Mirik CD block in the Mirik subdivision of the Darjeeling district in the Indian state of West Bengal.

== Etymology ==
In 1881, the tea estate was developed in the lush green paddy fields owned by a person named 'Gopal'. 'Dhara' is a small stream in the local Nepali language. Gopal's paddy fields were interspersed with many small streams. Put together the name became "Gopaldhara".

== History ==
In 1881, a new plantation was developed for Tappu and Tara Sahib. In 1920 the tea estate was bought by Kingslay, who in turn sold it to Moolji Sikka and Company in 1947. Dalchand Saria bought Gopaldhara Tea Estate in 1953–54. As of 2020, his son, Shiv Saria and his grandson, Hrishikesh Saria, manages the affairs of Gopldhara Tea Estate under the banner of Sona Tea Group. This group also manages Rohini Tea Garden in Darjeeling and New Glenco and Soonagachi Tea Estate in the Dooars.

== Geography ==
Places and tea estates in the southern portion of Darjeeling Sadar subdivision (including Jorebunglow Sukhiapokhri CD block), and Mirik Subdivision in Darjeeling district
CT: census town, R: rural/ urban centre, NP: national park/ wildlife sanctuary, TE: tea estate
Abbreviations used in names – TG for Tea Garden (town/village), TE for Tea Estate
Owing to space constraints in the small map, the actual locations in a larger map may vary slightly

Gopaldhara Tea Estate, “one of Darjeeling’s pride”, is one of the highest tea estates in Darjeeling producing Darjeeling tea. Out of a total area of 320 ha (790 acres), 172 ha (430 acres) have been planted with tea. Most of the estate is between 5,500 to 7,000 feet (1,700 to 2,100 m) and a sizeable area of 60 ha (150 acres) is at an average elevation of 6,500 ft (2,000 m). The high altitudes of Darjeeling offer a perfect combination of moisture and sunlight ideal for mature high quality tea leaves. The cloud cover helps the aroma to linger on. Gopldhara Tea Estate produces premium tea, most of which is exported. As a result of the cooler environments at great heights, tea plants grow at a slower pace. Normally tea gardens follow a follow a 5-year cycle of tea pruning when tea plants are pruned by 30–40 cm. At higher heights it becomes a 7-year cycle.

Note: The map alongside presents some of the notable locations in the subdivision. All places marked in the map are linked in the larger full screen map.

== Developments ==
Gopaldhara Tea Estate produces the finest Darjeeling tea in all categories such as Black, Green, White, Oolong, Flavored, Speciality Tea and Handcrafted tea. It has built a new factory. Vacant high elevation areas are being planted with fresh varieties.
