= Shahrah, South Khorasan =

Village in South Khorasan province, Iran

Shahrah Persian: شهراه
- Village
- Location within Iran
- Coordinates: 33°18′42″N 59°34′57″E
- Country: Iran
- Province: South Khorasan
- County: Birjand
- District: Shakhenat
- Rural District: Shakhen

Population (2016)
  - Total: Below reporting threshold
- Time zone: UTC+3:30 (IRST)

Shahrah (Persian: شهراه) (Note: Also romanized as Shahrāh and Shāhrāh; also known as Sang-e Kar) is a village in Shakhen Rural District of Shakhenat District in Birjand County, South Khorasan province, Iran.

== Demographics ==
=== Population ===
At the time of the 2006 National Census, the village's population was 18 in 11 households, when it was in the Central District. The following census in 2011 counted nine people in six households. The 2016 census measured the population of the village as below the reporting threshold.

In 2021, the rural district was separated from the district in the formation of Shakhenat District.
