= Novik, Iran =

Village in South Khorasan province, Iran

Novik Persian: نويك
- Village
- Location within Iran
- Coordinates: 33°16′18″N 59°30′17″E
- Country: Iran
- Province: South Khorasan
- County: Birjand
- District: Shakhenat
- Rural District: Shakhenat

Population (2016)
  - Total: 43
- Time zone: UTC+3:30 (IRST)

Novik (Persian: نويك) (Note: Also romanized as Novīk and Nowvīk; also known as Nauwik, Nīk, and Nivik) is a village in Shakhenat Rural District of Shakhenat District in Birjand County, South Khorasan province, Iran.

== Demographics ==
=== Population ===
At the time of the 2006 National Census, the village's population was 76 in 27 households, when it was in the Central District. The following census in 2011 counted 48 people in 24 households. The 2016 census measured the population of the village as 43 people in 20 households.

In 2021, the rural district was separated from the district in the formation of Shakhenat District.
