= Mahmuei =

Village in South Khorasan province, Iran

Mahmuei Persian: مهموئي
- Village
- Location within Iran
- Coordinates: 33°19′45″N 59°21′00″E
- Country: Iran
- Province: South Khorasan
- County: Birjand
- District: Shakhenat
- Rural District: Shakhenat

Population (2016)
  - Total: 750
- Time zone: UTC+3:30 (IRST)

Mahmuei (Persian: مهموئی) is a village in Shakhenat Rural District of Shakhenat District in Birjand County, South Khorasan province, Iran.

According to legend, the first settlers named the village "Mahmûeî" because it was on open and flat ground. The word mahmuei is a derivation of the word mahmah which according to the Dehkhoda Dictionary means a flat plain.

== History ==
There is a shrine in the village cemetery where a pious man known as Âqâye Mîr-Abbâss, a descendant of Muhammad (Seyyed), was buried 70 years ago. The natives respect the shrine and dedicate money to it for obtaining their wants. About 1920s, at the time of making grape syrup (shîre-ye angoor) via boiling grape juice, somebody said to him "you are not a descendant of The Prophet." Mîr-Abbâss became annoyed and stepped into the huge fire that was lighted for boiling grape juices. He sat in the midst of the fireplace (Golkhan) to prove miraculously that he was a descendant of Muhammad. He stayed in the fireplace for a while and did not go out till some villagers entreated him to go out. After that event, the villagers believed and respected him and built a monument on his grave.

Since 1950, many people emigrated from Mahmuei to city areas, especially to Tehran and Mashad. Many of these emigrants gather in the village during Muharram when a ceremony of ta'ziyeh (or "shabih-khani") is performed.

== Demographics ==
=== Language and religion ===
The inhabitants are Shiite Muslims speaking a local dialect of Persian.

=== Population ===
Official statistics for Mahmuei in 1996 estimated a population of 695 people (185 houses and 223 families). At the time of the 2006 National Census, the village's population was 726 in 243 households, when it was in the Central District. The following census in 2011 counted 860 people in 238 households. The 2016 census measured the population of the village as 750 people in 221 households. It was the most populous village in its rural district.

In 2021, the rural district was separated from the district in the formation of Shakhenat District.

== Overview ==
Most of the population is engaged in agriculture. Major products of Mahmuei are saffron (Za`ferân) and barberry (Zereshk) that are cultivated for exporting. Beet and wheat are cultivated as well. Grapes, black plume, apricots, melons, watermelons, almonds and pistachios are produced for local use. Before 1950, opium was also cultivated. Prior to digging the first deep well about 1980s, dry farming was the only agricultural method. Today, in addition to a string of underground aqueducts (Qanât), there are two networks of piped water and 23 electric and diesel deep wells for field irrigation.

Modern facilities include an electricity network since 1986, healthcare, telephone (just one line since 1996, is +98 056 2533 -3400), drinking water since 1998, unrefined piped water, asphalt roads, a rural cooperative, an Islamic council, elementary school and a boarding middle school.
