= Vashan, South Khorasan =

Village in South Khorasan province, Iran

Vashan Persian: واشان
- Village
- Location within Iran
- Coordinates: 33°19′16″N 59°33′48″E
- Country: Iran
- Province: South Khorasan
- County: Birjand
- District: Shakhenat
- Rural District: Shakhen

Population (2016)
  - Total: 398
- Time zone: UTC+3:30 (IRST)

Vashan (Persian: واشان) (Note: Also romanized as Vāshān; also known as Vāshau and Vashon) is a village in Shakhen Rural District of Shakhenat District in Birjand County, South Khorasan province, Iran.

== Demographics ==
=== Population ===
At the time of the 2006 National Census, the village's population was 622 in 162 households, when it was in the Central District. The following census in 2011 counted 442 people in 137 households. The 2016 census measured the population of the village as 398 people in 122 households.

In 2021, the rural district was separated from the district in the formation of Shakhenat District.
