= Daraj =

Village in South Khorasan province, Iran

Daraj Persian: دارج
- Village
- Location within Iran
- Coordinates: 33°14′45″N 59°32′43″E
- Country: Iran
- Province: South Khorasan
- County: Birjand
- District: Shakhenat
- Rural District: Shakhenat

Population (2016)
  - Total: 211
- Time zone: UTC+3:30 (IRST)

Daraj (Persian: دارج) (Note: Also romanized as Darāj, Darej, and Dārej; also known as Dāraj Bālā and Dārij) is a village in Shakhenat Rural District of Shakhenat District in Birjand County, South Khorasan province, Iran.

== Demographics ==
=== Population ===
At the time of the 2006 National Census, the village's population was 242 in 66 households, when it was in the Central District. The following census in 2011 counted 167 people in 54 households. The 2016 census measured the population of the village as 211 people in 70 households.

In 2021, the rural district was separated from the district in the formation of Shakhenat District.
