= Nughab Chik =

Village in South Khorasan province, Iran

Nughab Chik Persian: نوغاب چيك
- Village
- Location within Iran
- Coordinates: 33°16′00″N 59°30′37″E
- Country: Iran
- Province: South Khorasan
- County: Birjand
- District: Shakhenat
- Rural District: Shakhenat

Population (2016)
  - Total: 92
- Time zone: UTC+3:30 (IRST)

Nughab Chik (Persian: نوغاب چيك) (Note: Also romanized as Nūghāb Chīk; also known as Naqūchik and Nūqāb Chīk) is a village in Shakhenat Rural District of Shakhenat District in Birjand County, South Khorasan province, Iran.

== Demographics ==
=== Population ===
At the time of the 2006 National Census, the village's population was 154 in 66 households, when it was in the Central District. The following census in 2011 counted 132 people in 62 households. The 2016 census measured the population of the village as 92 people in 41 households.

In 2021, the rural district was separated from the district in the formation of Shakhenat District.
