= Saqdar =

Village in South Khorasan province, Iran

Saqdar Persian: ساقدر
- Village
- Location within Iran
- Coordinates: 33°16′37″N 59°28′45″E
- Country: Iran
- Province: South Khorasan
- County: Birjand
- District: Shakhenat
- Rural District: Shakhenat

Population (2016)
  - Total: 84
- Time zone: UTC+3:30 (IRST)

Saqdar (Persian: ساقدر) (Note: Also romanized as Sāqdar; also known as Sagdar) is a village in Shakhenat Rural District of Shakhenat District in Birjand County, South Khorasan province, Iran.

== Demographics ==
=== Population ===
At the time of the 2006 National Census, the village's population was 181 in 75 households, when it was in the Central District. The following census in 2011 counted 134 people in 57 households. The 2016 census measured the population of the village as 84 people in 40 households.

In 2021, the rural district was separated from the district in the formation of Shakhenat District.
