= Bimad =

Village in South Khorasan province, Iran

Bimad Persian: بیماد
- Village
- Location within Iran
- Coordinates: 33°21′27″N 59°29′16″E
- Country: Iran
- Province: South Khorasan
- County: Birjand
- District: Shakhenat
- Rural District: Shakhen

Population (2016)
  - Total: 42
- Time zone: UTC+3:30 (IRST)

Bimad (Persian: بیماد) (Note: Also romanized as Bīmād; also known as Bīmār (بيمار)) is a village in Shakhen Rural District of Shakhenat District in Birjand County, South Khorasan province, Iran.

== Demographics ==
=== Population ===
At the time of the 2006 National Census, the village's population was 91 in 30 households, when it was in the Central District. The following census in 2011 counted 59 people in 25 households. The 2016 census measured the population of the village as 42 people in 21 households.

In 2021, the rural district was separated from the district in the formation of Shakhenat District.
