= Asnan, Iran =

Village in South Khorasan province, Iran

Asnan Persian: اسنان
- Village
- Location within Iran
- Coordinates: 33°16′47″N 59°34′49″E
- Country: Iran
- Province: South Khorasan
- County: Birjand
- District: Shakhenat
- Rural District: Shakhenat

Population (2016)
  - Total: 175
- Time zone: UTC+3:30 (IRST)

Asnan (Persian: اسنان) (Note: Also romanized as Asnān and Esnān; also known as Īsnu) is a village in Shakhenat Rural District of Shakhenat District in Birjand County, South Khorasan province, Iran.

== Demographics ==
=== Population ===
At the time of the 2006 National Census, the village's population was 298 in 87 households, when it was in the Central District. The following census in 2011 counted 215 people in 76 households. The 2016 census measured the population of the village as 175 people in 65 households.

In 2021, the rural district was separated from the district in the formation of Shakhenat District.
