= Qurjan =

Qurjan (Persian: قورجان) may refer to:

- Qurjan, Isfahan
- Qurjan, South Khorasan
