= Bistkonj =

Village in South Khorasan province, Iran

Bistkonj Persian: بیست کنج
- Village
- Location within Iran
- Coordinates: 33°20′45″N 59°28′50″E
- Country: Iran
- Province: South Khorasan
- County: Birjand
- District: Shakhenat
- Rural District: Shakhen

Population (2016)
  - Total: 78
- Time zone: UTC+3:30 (IRST)

Bistkonj (Persian: بيست كنج) (Note: Also romanized as Bīstkonj; also known as Baskonj and Baskunj) is a village in Shakhen Rural District of Shakhenat District in Birjand County, South Khorasan province, Iran.

== Demographics ==
=== Population ===
At the time of the 2006 National Census, the village's population was 162 in 47 households, when it was in the Central District. The following census in 2011 counted 106 people in 38 households. The 2016 census measured the population of the village as 78 people in 31 households.

In 2021, the rural district was separated from the district in the formation of Shakhenat District.
