= Bavik-e Vosta =

Village in South Khorasan province, Iran

Bavik-e Vosta Persian: بويك وسطي
- Village
- Location within Iran
- Coordinates: 33°16′05″N 59°27′14″E
- Country: Iran
- Province: South Khorasan
- County: Birjand
- District: Shakhenat
- Rural District: Shakhenat

Population (2016)
  - Total: 237
- Time zone: UTC+3:30 (IRST)

Bavik-e Vosta (Persian: بويك وسطي) (Note: Also romanized as Bavīk-e Vosţá; also known as Bavīk and Bawīk) is a village in Shakhenat Rural District of Shakhenat District in Birjand County, South Khorasan province, Iran.

== Demographics ==
=== Population ===
At the time of the 2006 National Census, the village's population was 318 in 110 households, when it was in the Central District. The following census in 2011 counted 264 people in 105 households. The 2016 census measured the population of the village as 237 people in 99 households.

In 2021, the rural district was separated from the district in the formation of Shakhenat District.
