= Owjad =

Village in South Khorasan province, Iran

Owjad Persian: اوجاد
- Village
- Location within Iran
- Coordinates: 33°17′50″N 59°34′28″E
- Country: Iran
- Province: South Khorasan
- County: Birjand
- District: Shakhenat
- Rural District: Shakhenat

Population (2016)
  - Total: 81
- Time zone: UTC+3:30 (IRST)

Owjad (Persian: اوجاد) (Note: Also romanized as Aujad and Owjād; also known as Ūjād) is a village in Shakhenat Rural District of Shakhenat District in Birjand County, South Khorasan province, Iran.

== Demographics ==
=== Population ===
At the time of the 2006 National Census, the village's population was 89 in 36 households, when it was in the Central District. The following census in 2011 counted 57 people in 29 households. The 2016 census measured the population of the village as 81 people in 43 households.

In 2021, the rural district was separated from the district in the formation of Shakhenat District.
