= Shakhen =

Village in South Khorasan province, Iran

Shakhen Persian: شاخن
- Village
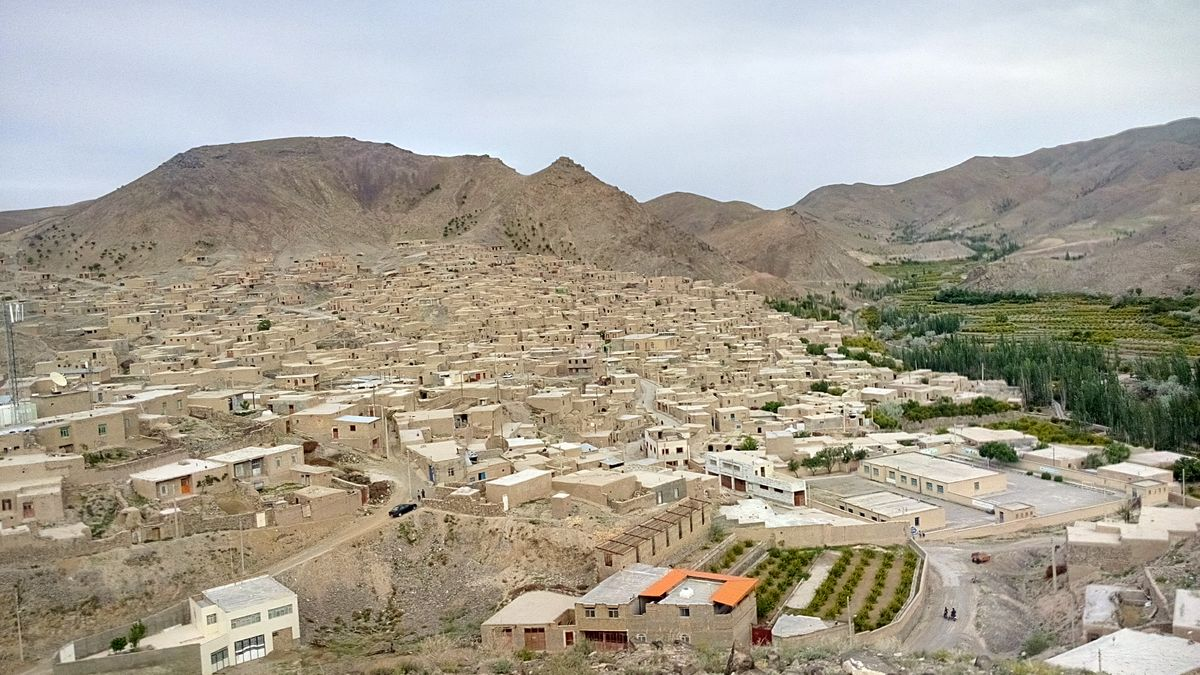
- The village of Shakhen

- Location within Iran
- Coordinates: 33°21′38″N 59°32′16″E
- Country: Iran
- Province: South Khorasan
- County: Birjand
- District: Shakhenat
- Rural District: Shakhen

Population (2016)
  - Total: 1,342
- Time zone: UTC+3:30 (IRST)

Shakhen (Persian: شاخن) (Note: Also romanized as Shākhen; also known as Shākhīn) is a village in, and the capital of, Shakhen Rural District in Shakhenat District of Birjand County, South Khorasan province, Iran.

== Demographics ==
=== Population ===
At the time of the 2006 National Census, the village's population was 1,468 in 397 households, when it was in the Central District. The following census in 2011 counted 1,226 people in 406 households. The 2016 census measured the population of the village as 1,342 people in 422 households, the most populous in its rural district.

In 2021, the rural district was separated from the district in the formation of Shakhenat District.
