= Padamrud =

Village in South Khorasan province, Iran

Padamrud Persian: پدمرود
- Village
- Location within Iran
- Coordinates: 33°28′49″N 59°30′42″E
- Country: Iran
- Province: South Khorasan
- County: Birjand
- District: Shakhenat
- Rural District: Shakhen

Population (2016)
  - Total: 122
- Time zone: UTC+3:30 (IRST)

Padamrud (Persian: پدمرود) (Note: Also romanized as Padamrūd and Padāmrūd; also known as Pādomrū) is a village in Shakhen Rural District of Shakhenat District in Birjand County, South Khorasan province, Iran.

== Demographics ==
=== Population ===
At the time of the 2006 National Census, the village's population was 79 in 25 households, when it was in the Central District. The following census in 2011 counted 69 people in 24 households. The 2016 census measured the population of the village as 122 people in 37 households.

In 2021, the rural district was separated from the district in the formation of Shakhenat District.
