= Ojan =

Ojan (Persian: اوژن) may refer to:

- Bostanabad
- Owjan, South Khorasan
