= Razuk =

Village in South Khorasan province, Iran

Razuk Persian: رزوك
- Village
- Location within Iran
- Coordinates: 33°14′23″N 59°32′07″E
- Country: Iran
- Province: South Khorasan
- County: Birjand
- District: Shakhenat
- Rural District: Shakhenat

Population (2016)
  - Total: 12
- Time zone: UTC+3:30 (IRST)

Razuk (Persian: رزوك) (Note: Also romanized as Rāzūk) is a village in Shakhenat Rural District of Shakhenat District in Birjand County, South Khorasan province, Iran.

== Demographics ==
=== Population ===
At the time of the 2006 National Census, the village's population was 21 in four households, when it was in the Central District. The following census in 2011 counted a population below the reporting threshold. The 2016 census measured the population of the village as 12 people in four households.

In 2021, the rural district was separated from the district in the formation of Shakhenat District.
