= Shakhenat Rural District =

Rural district in South Khorasan province, Iran

Shakhenat Rural District Persian: دهستان شاخنات
- Rural District
- Location within Iran
- Coordinates: 33°19′N 59°29′E
- Country: Iran
- Province: South Khorasan
- County: Birjand
- District: Shakhenat
- Established: 1987
- Capital: Gazar

Population (2016)
  - Total: 2,594
- Time zone: UTC+3:30 (IRST)

Shakhenat Rural District (Persian: دهستان شاخنات) is in Shakhenat District of Birjand County, South Khorasan province, Iran. Its capital is the village of Gazar.

== Demographics ==
=== Population ===
At the time of the 2006 National Census, the rural district's population (as a part of the Central District) was 3,105 in 1,086 households. There were 2,909 inhabitants in 985 households at the following census of 2011. The 2016 census measured the population of the rural district as 2,594 in 942 households. The most populous of its 15 villages was Mahmuei, with 750 people.

In 2021, the rural district was separated from the district in the formation of Shakhenat District.

=== Other villages in the rural district ===
- Asnan
- Bavik-e Vosta
- Bidokht
- Daraj
- Novik
- Nughab Chik
- Owjad
- Rahnich
- Razuk
- Saqdar
- Varqaneh
