= Bidokht, Birjand =

Village in South Khorasan province, Iran

Bidokht Persian: بيدخت
- Village
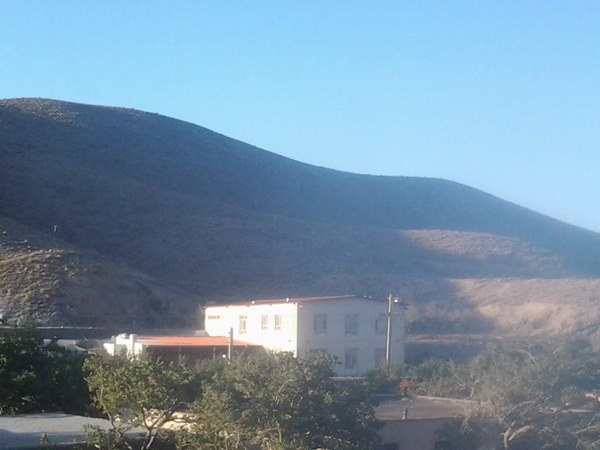
- The village of Bidokht

- Location within Iran
- Coordinates: 33°16′58″N 59°30′27″E
- Country: Iran
- Province: South Khorasan
- County: Birjand
- District: Shakhenat
- Rural District: Shakhenat

Population (2016)
  - Total: 140
- Time zone: UTC+3:30 (IRST)

Bidokht (Persian: بيدخت) (Note: Also romanized as Bīdokht; also known as Bīdukht) is a village in Shakhenat Rural District of Shakhenat District in Birjand County, South Khorasan province, Iran.

== Demographics ==
=== Population ===
At the time of the 2006 National Census, the village's population was 219 in 81 households, when it was in the Central District. The following census in 2011 counted 176 people in 70 households. The 2016 census measured the population of the village as 140 people in 56 households.

In 2021, the rural district was separated from the district in the formation of Shakhenat District.
