= Owjan, South Khorasan =

Village in South Khorasan province, Iran

Owjan Persian: اوجان
- Village
- Location within Iran
- Coordinates: 33°26′37″N 59°27′20″E
- Country: Iran
- Province: South Khorasan
- County: Birjand
- District: Shakhenat
- Rural District: Shakhen

Population (2016)
  - Total: 834
- Time zone: UTC+3:30 (IRST)

Owjan (Persian: اوجان) (Note: Also romanized as Owjān; also known as Ojān) is a village in Shakhen Rural District of Shakhenat District in Birjand County, South Khorasan province, Iran.

== Demographics ==
=== Population ===
At the time of the 2006 National Census, the village's population was 942 in 220 households, when it was in the Central District. The following census in 2011 counted 819 people in 231 households. The 2016 census measured the population of the village as 834 people in 238 households.

In 2021, the rural district was separated from the district in the formation of Shakhenat District.
