= Mirik, Iran =

Village in South Khorasan province, Iran

Mirik Persian: میریک
- Village
- Location within Iran
- Coordinates: 33°24′27″N 59°28′59″E
- Country: Iran
- Province: South Khorasan
- County: Birjand
- District: Shakhenat
- Rural District: Shakhen

Population (2016)
  - Total: 1,235
- Time zone: UTC+3:30 (IRST)

Mirik (Persian: میریک) (Note: Also romanized as Mīrīk; also known as Murīd) is a village in Shakhen Rural District of Shakhenat District in Birjand County, South Khorasan province, Iran.

== Demographics ==
=== Population ===
At the time of the 2006 National Census, the village's population was 1,095 in 267 households, when it was in the Central District. The following census in 2011 counted 963 people in 284 households. The 2016 census measured the population of the village as 1,235 people in 378 households.

In 2021, the rural district was separated from the district in the formation of Shakhenat District.
