= Gazar, Iran =

Village in South Khorasan province, Iran

Gazar Persian: گازار
- Village
- Location within Iran
- Coordinates: 33°18′16″N 59°24′47″E
- Country: Iran
- Province: South Khorasan
- County: Birjand
- District: Shakhenat
- Rural District: Shakhenat

Population (2016)
  - Total: 622
- Time zone: UTC+3:30 (IRST)

Gazar (Persian: گازار) (Note: Also romanized as Gāzār) is a village in Shakhenat Rural District of Shakhenat District, Birjand County, South Khorasan province, Iran, serving as capital of both the district and the rural district.

== Demographics ==
=== Population ===
At the time of the 2006 National Census, the village's population was 520 in 207 households, when it was in the Central District. The following census in 2011 counted 669 people in 200 households. The 2016 census measured the population of the village as 622 people in 224 households.

In 2021, the rural district was separated from the district in the formation of Shakhenat District.
