= Rahnich =

Village in South Khorasan province, Iran

Rahnich Persian: رهنيچ
- Village
- Location within Iran
- Coordinates: 33°14′43″N 59°29′31″E
- Country: Iran
- Province: South Khorasan
- County: Birjand
- District: Shakhenat
- Rural District: Shakhenat

Population (2016)
  - Total: 47
- Time zone: UTC+3:30 (IRST)

Rahnich (Persian: رهنيچ) (Note: Also romanized as Rahnīch; also known as Rahneshk and Rahnīeh) is a village in Shakhenat Rural District of Shakhenat District in Birjand County, South Khorasan province, Iran.

== Demographics ==
=== Population ===
At the time of the 2006 National Census, the village's population was 133 in 45 households, when it was in the Central District. The following census in 2011 counted 76 people in 30 households. The 2016 census measured the population of the village as 47 people in 20 households.

In 2021, the rural district was separated from the district in the formation of Shakhenat District.
