= Fur Jan =

Village in South Khorasan province, Iran

Fur Jan Persian: فورجان
- Village
- Location within Iran
- Coordinates: 33°25′02″N 59°27′29″E
- Country: Iran
- Province: South Khorasan
- County: Birjand
- District: Shakhenat
- Rural District: Shakhen

Population (2016)
  - Total: 496
- Time zone: UTC+3:30 (IRST)

Fur Jan (Persian: فورجان) (Note: Also romanized as Fūr Jān; also known as Fūrg, Fūrgu, and Qūrjān) is a village in Shakhen Rural District of Shakhenat District in Birjand County, South Khorasan province, Iran.

== Demographics ==
=== Population ===
At the time of the 2006 National Census, the village's population was 551 in 331 households, when it was in the Central District. The following census in 2011 counted 435 people in 144 households. The 2016 census measured the population of the village as 496 people in 161 households.

In 2021, the rural district was separated from the district in the formation of Shakhenat District.
