= Shakhen Rural District =

Rural district in South Khorasan province, Iran

Shakhen Rural District Persian: دهستان شاخن
- Rural District
- Location within Iran
- Coordinates: 33°24′N 59°32′E
- Country: Iran
- Province: South Khorasan
- County: Birjand
- District: Shakhenat
- Established: 1995
- Capital: Shakhen

Population (2016)
  - Total: 5,372
- Time zone: UTC+3:30 (IRST)

Shakhen Rural District (Persian: دهستان شاخن) is in Shakhenat District of Birjand County, South Khorasan province, Iran. Its capital is the village of Shakhen.

== Demographics ==
=== Population ===
At the time of the 2006 National Census, the rural district's population (as a part of the Central District) was 6,276 in 1,609 households. There were 5,130 inhabitants in 1,587 households at the following census of 2011. The 2016 census measured the population of the rural district as 5,372 in 1,675 households. The most populous of its 13 villages was Shakhen, with 1,342 people.

In 2021, the rural district was separated from the district in the formation of Shakhenat District.

=== Other villages in the rural district ===
- Bimad
- Bistkonj
- Fur Jan
- Khazan
- Mirik
- Mobarakabad
- Owjan
- Padamrud
- Sarqan-e Sofla
- Shahrah
- Shur Ab
- Vashan
