= Bidokht, Khusf =

Bidokht بيدخت
- Village
- Location within Iran
- Coordinates: 32°26′05″N 59°03′07″E
- Country: Iran
- Province: South Khorasan
- County: Khusf
- Bakhsh: Jolgeh-e Mazhan
- Rural District: Jolgeh-e Mazhan

Population (2006)
  - Total: 19
- Time zone: UTC+3:30 (IRST)
  - Summer (DST): UTC+4:30 (IRDT)

Bidokht (Persian: بيدخت, also Romanized as Bīdokht) is a village in Jolgeh-e Mazhan Rural District, Jolgeh-e Mazhan District, Khusf County, South Khorasan Province, Iran. At the 2006 census, its population was 19, in 5 families.
