= Mirik (community development block) =

- Community development block
- Interactive map of Mirik
- Coordinates: 26.8854833°N 88.1872559°E
- Country: India
- State: West Bengal
- District: Darjeeling

Government
  - Type: Community development block

Area
  - Total: 122.28 km^{2} (47.21 sq mi)

Population (2011)
  - Total: 46,374
  - Density: 379.24/km^{2} (982.24/sq mi)
- Time zone: UTC+5:30 (IST)
- Lok Sabha constituency: Darjeeling
- Vidhan Sabha constituency: Kurseong
- Website: darjeeling.gov.in

Mirik is a community development block (CD block) that forms an administrative division in the Mirik subdivision of the Darjeeling district in the Indian state of West Bengal.

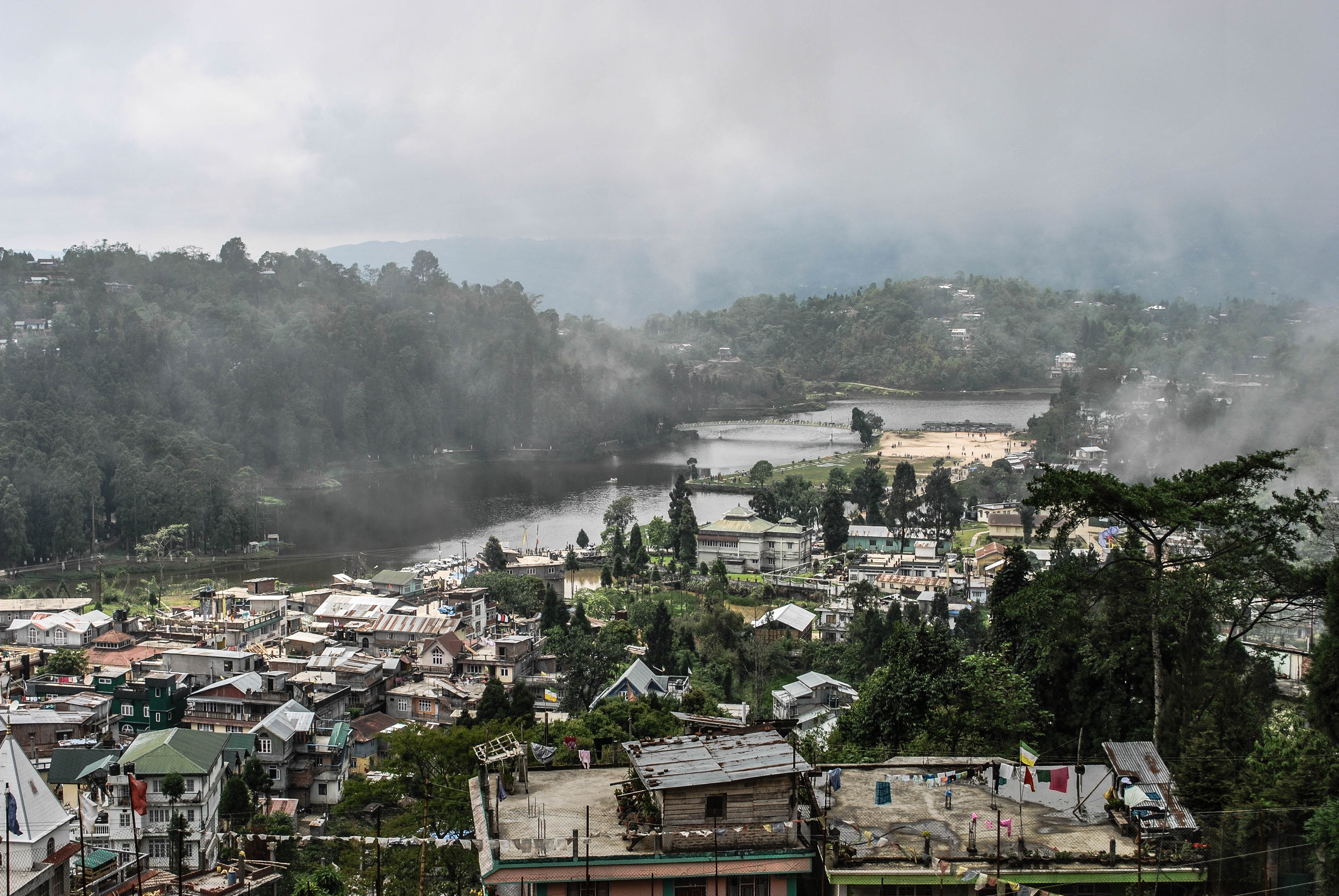
View of Mirik town with Mirik Lake

== Geography ==
Mirik CD block is located at 26.8854833°N 88.1872559°E.

The Mechi forms the international border with Nepal in a portion of the western part of the Darjeeling district, starting from Mirik CD block, down southwards. The Mechi-Mahananda interfluve is a transitional area between the hills and the plains and exhibits a wide range of topographical variations.

Mirik CD block is bounded by the Jorebunglow Sukhiapokhri CD block on the north, Kurseong CD block on the east, Naxalbari CD block on the south and Ilam District in Province No. 1 of Nepal on the west.

The Mirik CD block has an area of 119.18 km^{2}. It has 1 panchayat samity, 6 gram panchayats, 75 gram sansads (village councils), 21 mouzas and 21 inhabited villages. Mirik police station serves this block. Headquarters of this CD block is at Mirik.

Gram panchayats in Mirik CD block are: Chenga Panighata, Duptin, Paheligaon School Dara I, Paheligaon School Dara II, Soureni I and Soureni II.

== Demographics ==
=== Population ===
According to the 2011 Census of India, the Mirik CD block had a total population of 46,374, all of which were rural. There were 23,394 (50%) males and 22,980 (50%) females. There were 3,902 persons in the age range of 0 to 6 years. The Scheduled Castes numbered 3,619 (7.80%) and the Scheduled Tribes numbered 14,280 (30.79%).

Large villages (with 4,000+ population) in the Mirik CD block are (2011 census figures in brackets): Bukim Tea Garden (4,711), Mirik Khasmahal (4,329), New Fallodi Tea Garden (Ghyabari) (4,557) and Panighata (5,235).

Other villages in the Mirik CD block include (2011 census figures in brackets): Saurinibasti (3,901), Okayti Tea Garden (3,509), Marma Tea Garden (3,077), Singbulli Tea Garden (3,306), Pattong Tea Garden (2,337) and Lohagar Tea Garden (2,081).

=== Literacy ===
According to the 2011 census the total number of literate persons in the Mirik CD block was 34,334 (80.84% of the population over 6 years) out of which males numbered 18,873 (88.40% of the male population over 6 years) and females numbered 15,461 (73.20% of the female population over 6 years). The gender disparity (the difference between female and male literacy rates) was 15.21%.

See also – List of West Bengal districts ranked by literacy rate

Literacy in CD blocks of
Darjeeling district (2011)
Darjeeling Sadar subdivision
Darjeeling Pulbazar – 80.78%
Rangli Rangliot – 80.50%
Jorebunglow Sukhiapokhri – 82.54%
Kalimpong subdivision
Kalimpong I – 81.43%
Kalimpong II – 79.68%
Gorubathan – 76.88%
Kurseong subdivision
Kurseong – 81.15%
Mirik subdivision
Mirik – 80.84%
Siliguri subdivision
Matigara – 74.78%
Naxalbari – 75.47%
Phansidewa – 64.46%
Kharibari – 67.37%
2011 Census: CD Block Wise

Primary Census Abstract Data

=== Language and religion ===
The West Bengal Official Language Act 1961 declared that Bengali and Nepali were to be used for official purposes in the three hill subdivisions of Darjeeling, Kalimpong and Kurseong in Darjeeling district.

Religion in Mirik CD block (2011)
Hinduism	69.40%
Buddhism	18.85%
Christianity	7.93%
Kirat Mundhum	3.25%
Islam	0.41%
Other or not stated	0.16%

In the 2011 census, Hindus numbered 32,185 and formed 69.40% of the population in the Mirik CD block. Buddhists numbered 8,740 and formed 18.85% of the population. Christians numbered 3,678 and formed 7.93% of the population. Muslims numbered 190 and formed 0.41% of the population. Others numbered 1,581 and formed 3.41% of the population.

Languages of Mirik CD block (2011)
1. Nepali (92.0%)
2. Kurukh (3.11%)
3. Sadri (2.20%)
4. Others (2.73%)

At the time of the 2011 census, 91.96% of the population spoke Nepali, 3.11% Kurukh and 2.20% Sadri as their first language.

== Rural Poverty ==
According to the Rural Household Survey in 2005, 24.40% of the total number of families were BPL families in the Darjeeling district. According to a World Bank report, as of 2012, 4-9% of the population in Darjeeling, North 24 Parganas and South 24 Parganas districts were below poverty level, the lowest among the districts of West Bengal, which had an average 20% of the population below poverty line.

== Economy ==
=== Livelihood ===
Livelihood
in Mirik CD block
1. Cultivators (13.7%)
2. Agricultural labourers (14.5%)
3. Household industries (1.99%)
4. Other Workers (69.8%)

In the Mirik CD block in 2011, among the class of total workers, cultivators numbered 2,383 and formed 13.73%, agricultural labourers numbered 2,513 and formed 14.48%, household industry workers numbered 346 and formed 1.99% and other workers numbered 12,111 and formed 69.79%. Total workers numbered 17,353 and formed 37.42% of the total population, and non-workers numbered 29,021 and formed 62.58% of the population.

Note: In the census records a person is considered a cultivator, if the person is engaged in cultivation/ supervision of land owned by self/government/institution. When a person who works on another person's land for wages in cash or kind or share, is regarded as an agricultural labourer. Household industry is defined as an industry conducted by one or more members of the family within the household or village, and one that does not qualify for registration as a factory under the Factories Act. Other workers are persons engaged in some economic activity other than cultivators, agricultural labourers and household workers. It includes factory, mining, plantation, transport and office workers, those engaged in business and commerce, teachers, entertainment artistes and so on.

=== Infrastructure ===
There are 21 inhabited villages in the Mirik CD block, as per the District Census Handbook, Darjiling, 2011. 100% villages have power supply. 100% villages have drinking water supply. 6 villages (28.57%) have post offices. 15 villages (71.43%) have telephones (including landlines, public call offices and mobile phones). 10 villages (47.62%) have pucca (paved) approach roads and 6 villages (28.57%) have transport communication (includes bus service, rail facility and navigable waterways). 3 villages (14.29%) have agricultural credit societies and 2 villages (9.52%) have banks.

=== Agriculture ===
In 2012–13, there were 32 fair price shops in Mirik CD block.

In 2013–14, Mirik CD block produced 78 tonnes of Aman paddy, the main winter crop, from 36 hectares, 267 tonnes of maize from 88 hectares and 911 tonnes of potatoes from 59 hectares. It also produced pulses.

=== Tea gardens ===
Darjeeling tea “received the iconic status due to its significant aroma, taste and colour… the first Indian product to be marked with the Geographical Indication (GI) tag in 2003… As per the definition, “Darjeeling Tea” can only refer to tea that has been cultivated, grown, produced, manufactured and processed in tea gardens in few specific hilly areas of the district.” Apart from the hill areas, tea is also grown in the plain areas of the terai and dooars, but such gardens are not covered under the GI tag.

As of 2009–10, there were 87 tea gardens covered under the GI tag, employing 51,091 persons. Total land under cultivation was 17,828.38 hectares and total production was 7.36 million kg. A much larger population is indirectly dependent on the tea industry in the district. The average annual production including those from the plain areas, exceeds 10 million kg.

As of 2013, Darjeeling subdivision had 46 tea estates, Kalimpong subdivision had 29 tea estates and Kurseong subdivision had 6 tea gardens. This added up to 81 tea estates in the hill areas. Bannackburn Tea Estate and Lingia Tea Estate in Darjeeling were the first to come up in 1835. Siliguri subdivision in the terai region had 45 tea estates.

=== Banking ===
In 2012–13, Mirik CD block had offices of 2 gramin banks.

== Transport ==
Mirik CD block has 2 originating/ terminating bus routes. The nearest railway station is 40 km from the block headquarters.

State Highway 12 passes through Mirik CD block.

== Education ==
In 2012–13, Mirik CD block (including Mirik town) had 78 primary schools with 7,211 students, 3 middle schools with 919 students, 6 high schools with 2,131 students and 2 higher secondary schools with 2,127 students. Mirik CD block had 170 institutions for special and non-formal education with 6,964 students. Mirik municipal area (outside the CD block) had 1 general degree college with 715 students.

See also – Education in India

According to the 2011 census, in Mirik CD block, among the 21 inhabited villages, 2 villages did not have a school, 14 villages had two or more primary schools, 12 villages had at least 1 primary and 1 middle school and 8 villages had at least 1 middle and 1 secondary school.

Mirik College was established in 2000 at Mirik.

== Healthcare ==
In 2013, Mirik CD block had 1 rural hospital and 3 primary health centres with total 42 beds and 4 doctors (excluding private bodies). It had 11 family welfare subcentres. 2,354 patients were treated indoor and 57,253 patients were treated outdoor in the hospitals, health centres and subcentres of the CD block.

Mirik Rural Hospital, with 30 beds at Mirik, is the major government medical facility in the Mirik CD block. There are primary health centres at Sourani Bustee (with 10 beds), Duptin (PO Mirik) (with 2 beds) and Panighatta (with OPD only).
