= Mirik meatball =

Turkish Food

Mirik meatballs
- Alternative names: Mirik köfte
- Type: Sour soup
- Place of origin: Turkey
- Region or state: Central Anatolia
- Main ingredients: Ground meat, rice, leeks and some other ingredients

Mirik meatballs (Mirik köfte) is a Turkish recipe of meatballs from Sivas province, eastern Central Anatolia Region, Turkey. This is one of the traditional dishes of Sivas. The ingredients are bulgur, onion, eggs, salt, flour, yoghurt, butter, garlic, and red pepper.

== See also ==
- Harput meatballs
- Van köfte
- Sulu köfte
