= Rahnishk =

Rahnishk رهنیشک
- Village
- Location within Iran
- Coordinates: 32°57′40″N 59°27′37″E
- Country: Iran
- Province: South Khorasan
- County: Birjand
- Bakhsh: Central
- Rural District: Kahshang

Population (2016)
  - Total: 82
- Time zone: UTC+3:30 (IRST)
  - Summer (DST): UTC+4:30 (IRDT)

Rahnishk (Persian: رهنیشک, also Romanized as Rahnīshk, Rahanīshk, and Rahneshk; also known as Rahneg and Ranishk) is a village in Kahshang Rural District, in the Central District of Birjand County, South Khorasan Province, Iran. At the 2016 census, its population was 82, in 28 families.
