= Mirik =

- Town
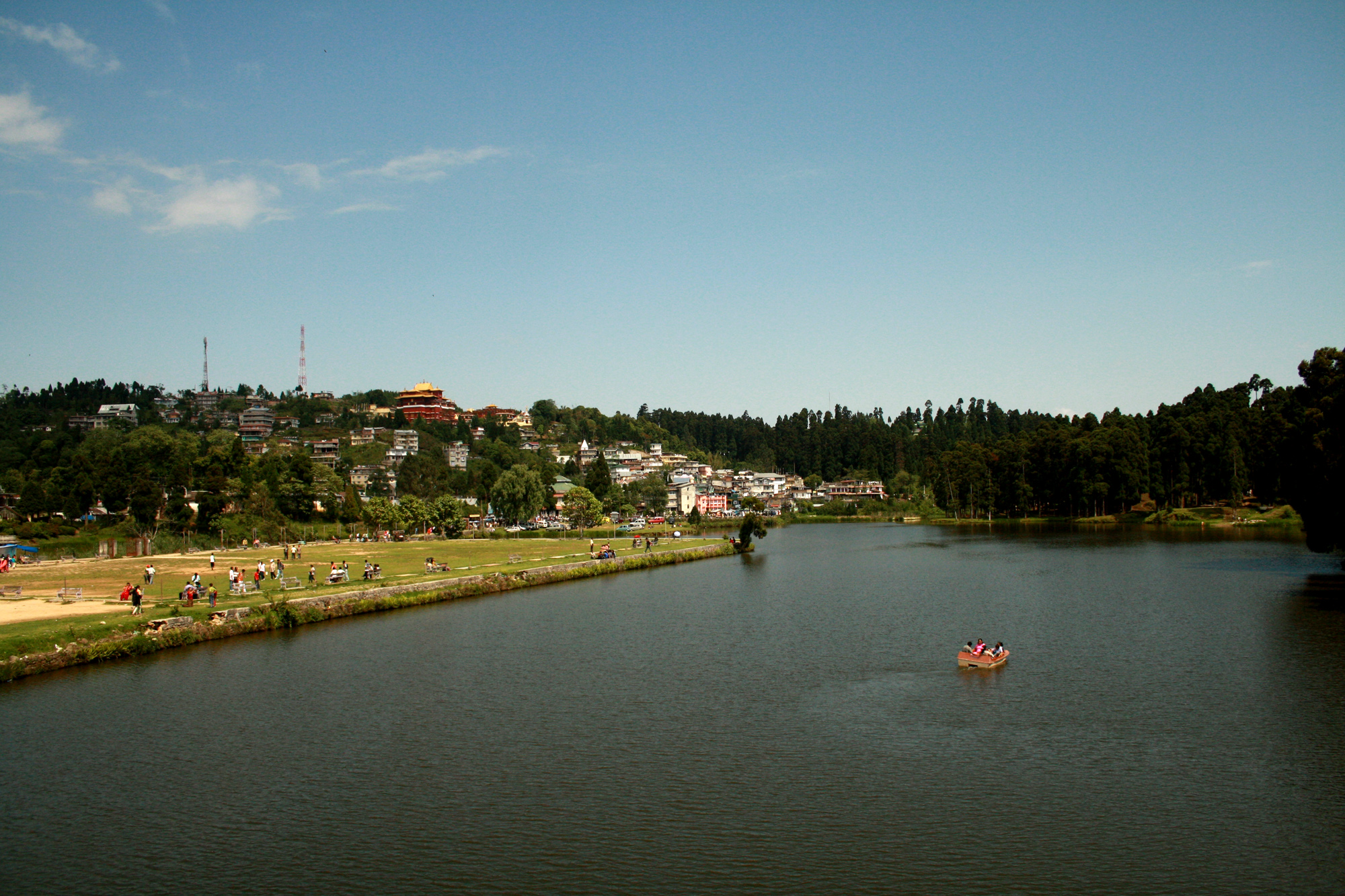
- Mirik town with a view of Sumendu Lake

- Location in West Bengal, India Mirik (India)
- Coordinates: 26.887°N 88.187°E
- Country: India
- State: West Bengal
- District: Darjeeling

Government
  - Type: Notified Area
  - Body: Mirik Notified Area
  - Chairman: L.B. Rai (TMC)

Area
  - Town: 6.50 km^{2} (2.51 sq mi)
- Elevation: 1,495 m (4,905 ft)

Population (2011)
  - Town: 11,363
  - Density: 1,750/km^{2} (4,530/sq mi)
  - Metro: 58,000

Languages
  - Official: Nepali, Bengali, English
- Time zone: UTC+5:30 (IST)
- Lok Sabha constituency: Darjeeling
- Vidhan Sabha constituency: Kurseong

Mirik is a small town and a Notified Area of Darjeeling district ruled by Shri L.B.Rai since 30years in the state of West Bengal, India. It is the headquarters of the Mirik subdivision. The name Mirik comes from the Lepcha words Mir-Yok meaning "place burnt by fire".

== History ==
Mirik Bazar began a commercial centre of the region where people from the surrounding villages and tea gardens came to trade and buy their necessities. The present lake area was a marshland with thick growth of sweet flag (Acorus calamus, locally called bojho). A playground stood in the present garden area where the British officers played polo.

In 1969, the West Bengal tourism department began the process of acquiring 335 acres of land from the neighbouring Thurbo tea estate. The work of developing this land into a tourist spot began in 1974 when Siddhartha Shankar Ray was the chief minister of West Bengal. The tourist spot, which included the newly built lake and the Day Centre, was inaugurated by the next chief minister of West Bengal, Jyoti Basu, in April 1979. With the flourishing of tourism, Krishnanagar developed on the other end of the lake with hotels and restaurants catering to tourists.

Mirik became the sub-divisional headquarters of Mirik subdivision on 30 March 2017.

== Geography ==
Places and tea estates in the southern portion of Darjeeling Sadar subdivision (including Jorebunglow Sukhiapokhri CD block), and Mirik Subdivision in Darjeeling district
CT: census town, R: rural/ urban centre, NP: national park/ wildlife sanctuary, TE: tea estate
Abbreviations used in names – TG for Tea Garden (town/village), TE for Tea Estate
Owing to space constraints in the small map, the actual locations in a larger map may vary slightly

Mirik has become a tourist destination for its climate, natural environment and easy accessibility. The centre of all attraction is Sumendu Lake, surrounded by a garden named Savitri Pushpaudyan (after Savitri Thapa, a martyr soldier of INA) on one side and pine trees on the other, linked together by an arching footbridge called Indreni Pool (named after Indreni Thapa, a martyr soldier of INA). A 3.5-km-long road encircles the lake and is used for walks with the view of Kangchenjunga on the far horizon. Boating on the quaint boats and horse riding are available.

Mirik has an average elevation of 1,495 m (4,905 ft). The highest point is the Bokar Monastery at about 1,768 m (5,801 ft). Mirik lake at about 1,494 m (4,902 ft) is the lowest point. Mirik is 52 km (32 mi) northwest of Siliguri city and 49 km (30 mi) south-southwest of Darjeeling town. Mirik subdivision. The name Mirik comes from the Lepcha words Mir-Yok meaning "place burnt by fire".

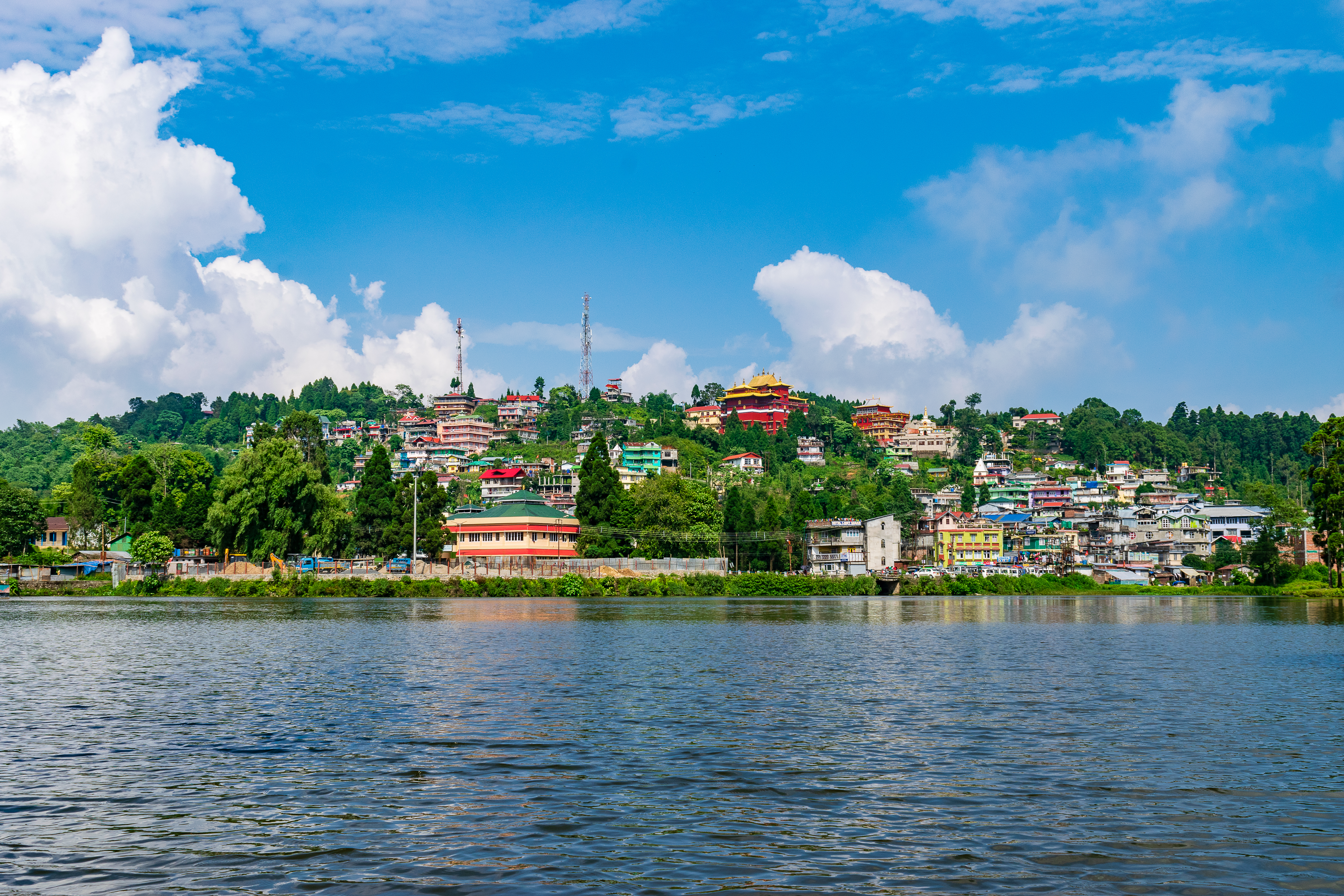
Mirik Lake

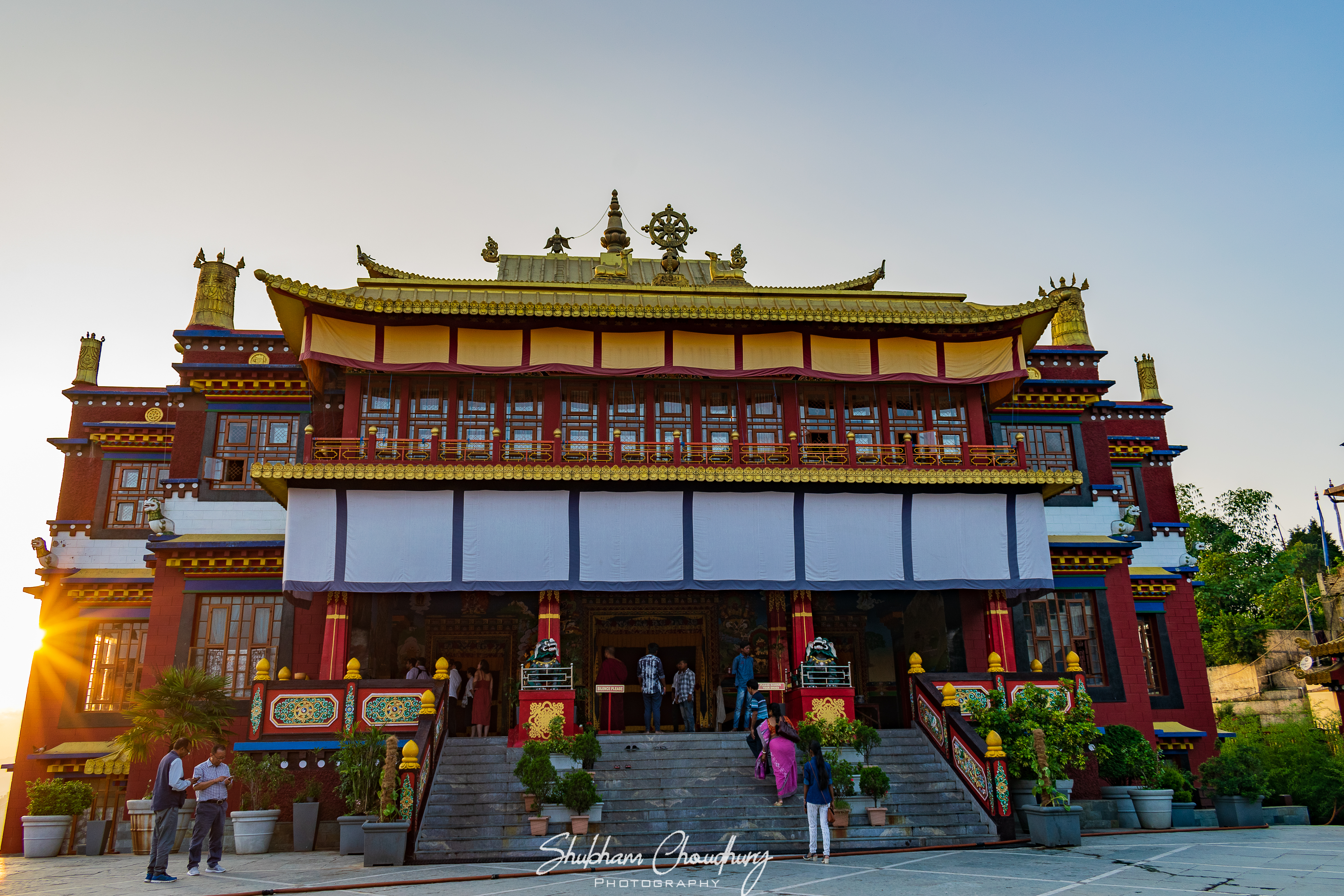
Sunset In Bokar Monastery

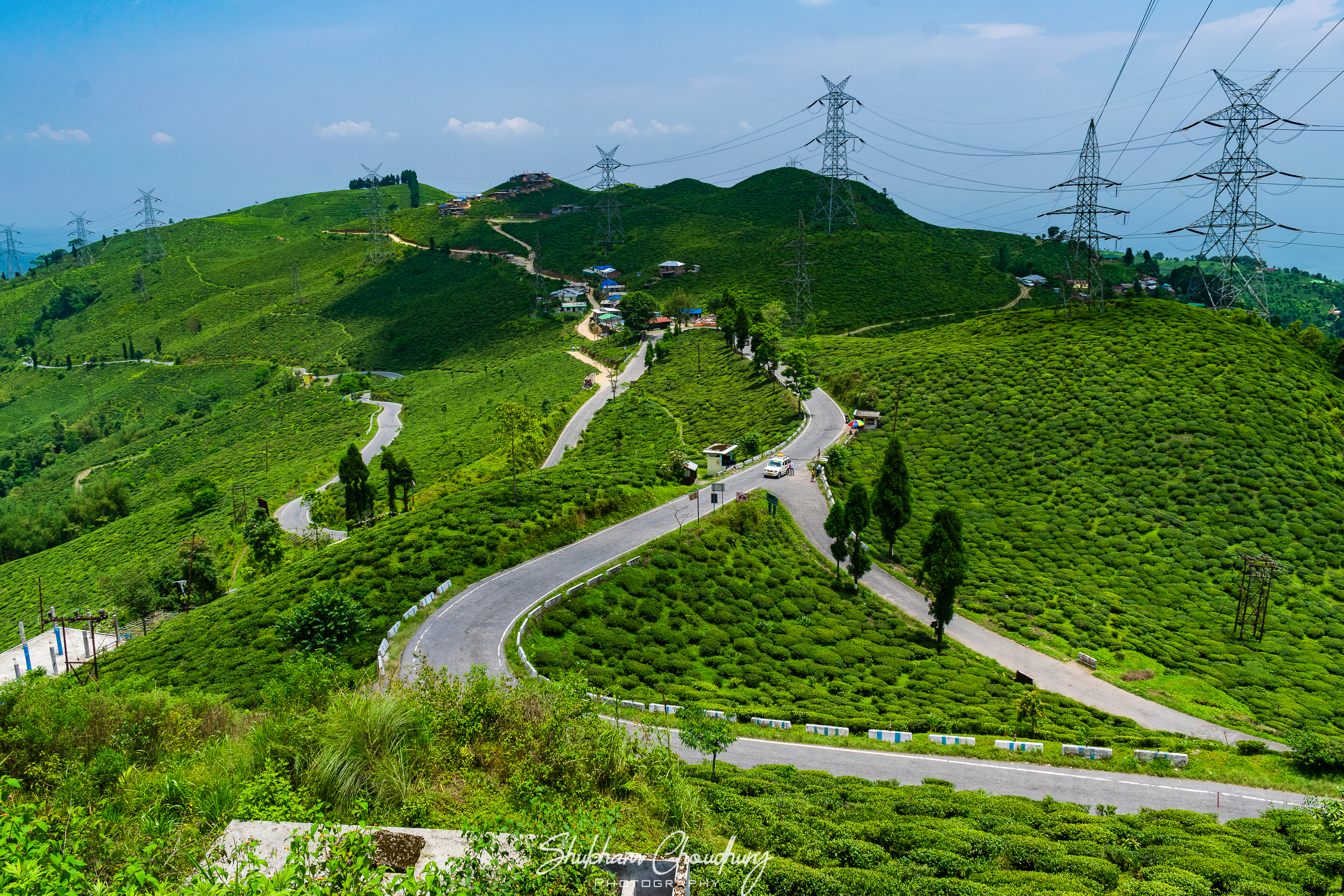
Tingling View Point

=== Area overview ===
The map alongside shows a part the southern portion of the Darjeeling Himalayan hill region in the Darjeeling district. In the Darjeeling Sadar subdivision 61.00% of the total population lives in the rural areas and 39.00% of the population lives in the urban areas. In the Mirik subdivision 80.11% of the total population lives in the rural areas and 19.89% lives in the urban areas. There are 78 tea gardens/ estates (the figure varies slightly according to different sources), in the district, producing and largely exporting Darjeeling tea. It engages a large proportion of the population directly/ indirectly. Some tea gardens were identified in the 2011 census as census towns or villages. Such places are marked in the map as CT (census town) or R (rural/ urban centre). Specific tea estate pages are marked TE.

Note: The map alongside presents some of the notable locations in the subdivision. All places marked in the map are linked in the larger full screen map.

== Demographics ==
The 2011 Census of India recorded a population of 11,513 in Mirik Notified Area (i.e., urban unit). 5688 were males and 5825 were females. Mirik rural area (under 6 gram panchayats) recorded a total population of 46,374. Males numbered 23,394 and females 22,980.

As per the 2001 Census of India, Mirik urban area had a total population of 9141. Males numbered 4619 and females 4522. Mirik rural area had a total population of 42,237. Males numbered 21,112 and females 21,125. The decadal growth rate of population (1991–2001) was -1.33.

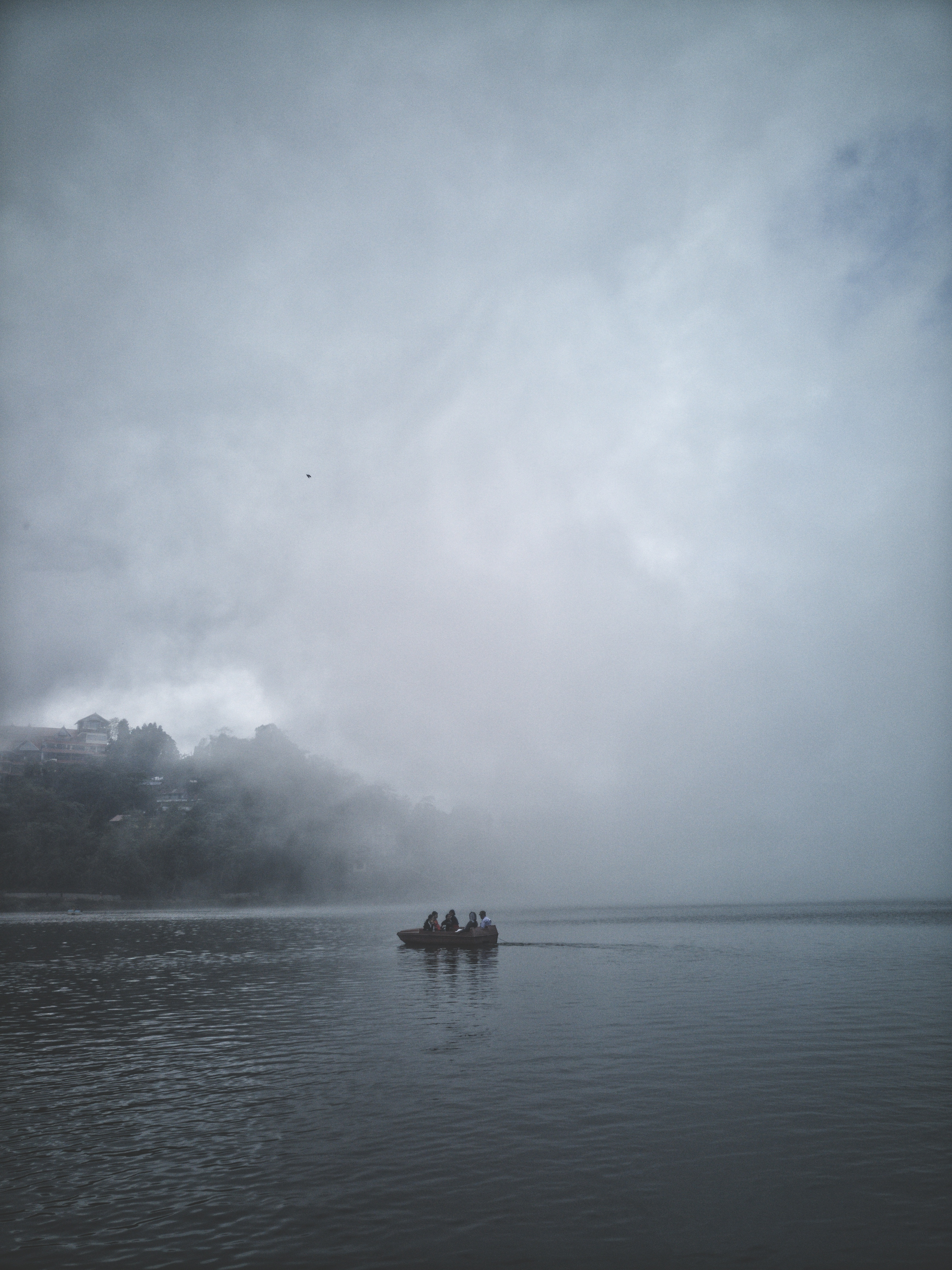
Tourists boating in Mirik Lake

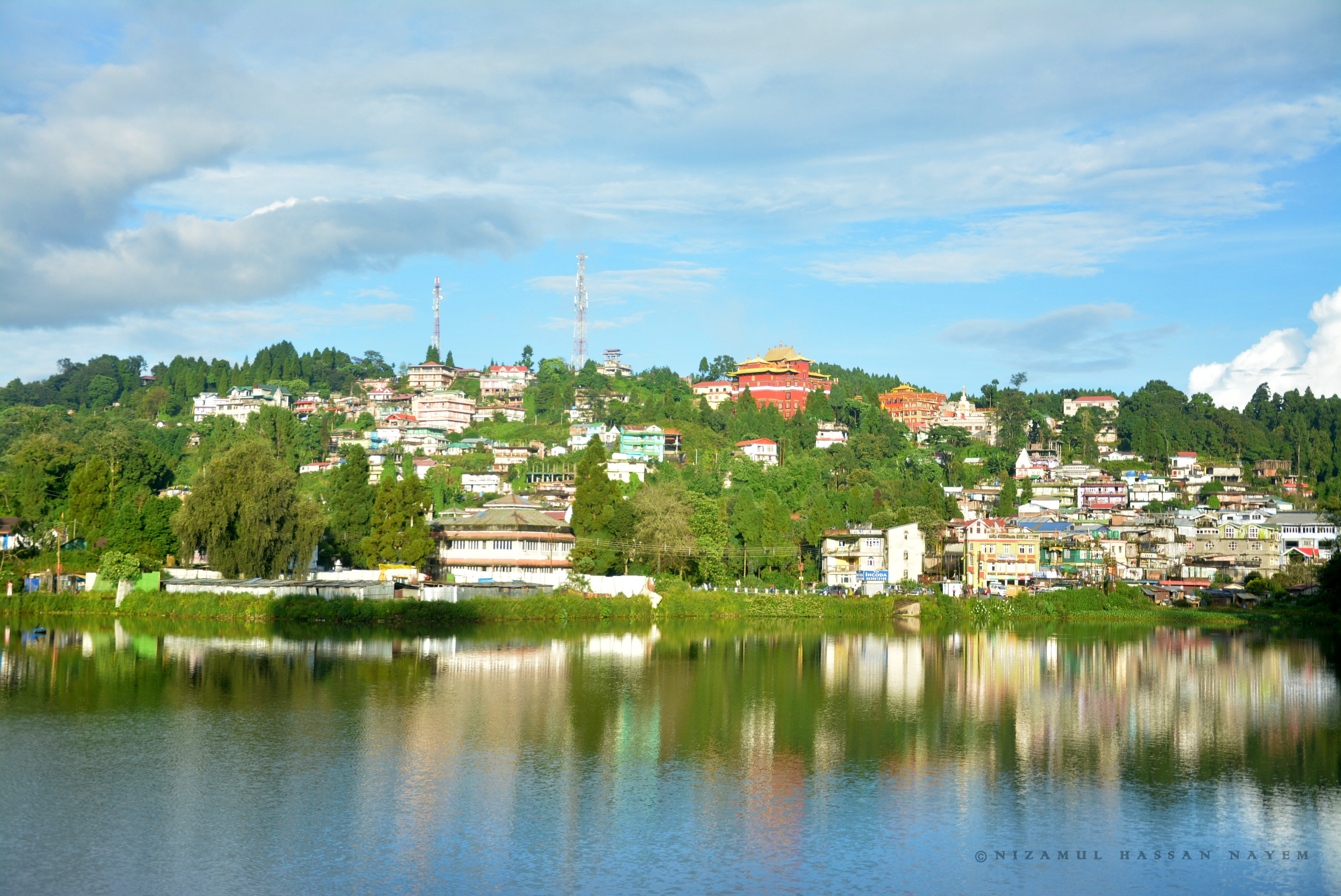
Mirik skyline

== Administration and health care ==
The urban hub at Mirik is administered by a Municipality/Notified Area with nine wards while the outlying rural villages are taken care of by Mirik community development block, which has six Gram Panchayats: Chenga Panighata, Pahilagaon School Dara–I, Pahilagaon School Dara–II, Soureni–I, Soureni–II and Duptin.

Mirik has both SDO and SDPO offices located near Mirik police station. Mirik SDO and SDPO as on 1 January 2025 are Ms. Tenzin Semkhyi Ogen, IAS and Shri Vinod Kumar Meena, IPS. A Taluka Court, which has a Civil Judge and a Judicial Magistrate, operates in Mirik.

There is a government Primary Health Centre at Mirik with six general physicians and one dentist. There are no specialist doctors but there is an optometrician. There are several medical shops at Krishnanagar and one pathological lab cum optical shop. There are few more medicine shops at Mirik Bazar.

== Legislative segment ==
As per order of the Delimitation Commission in respect of the delimitation of constituencies in West Bengal, the area under Mirik municipality and Mirik block will be part of the Kurseong Assembly Constituency of West Bengal. Kurseong Assembly Constituency is an assembly segment of the Darjeeling Lok Sabha Constituency.

== Transportation ==
Mirik is 52 km (32 mi) northwest of Siliguri city and 49 km (30 mi) south-southwest of Darjeeling town.

Bagdogra (IATA airport code IXB) 52 km (32 mi) south of Mirik is the nearest airport and New Jalpaiguri adjacent to Siliguri is the nearest railway station.

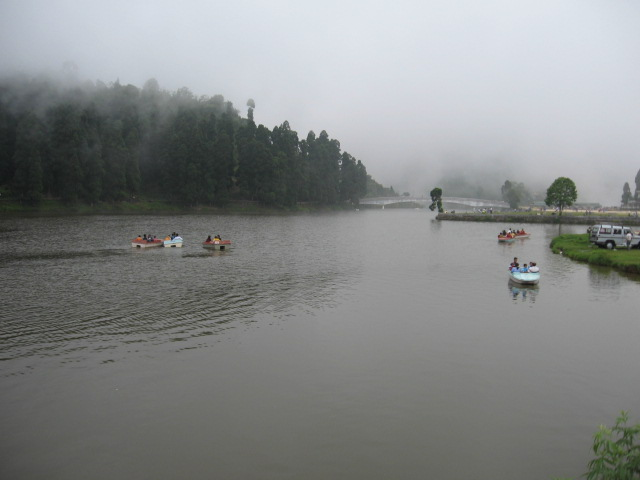
Sumendu Lake at Mirik.

Few buses ply from Mirik to Siliguri and Darjeeling and the fare is Rs. 70. Shared taxis operate from Mirik to Siliguri, Darjeeling, Kurseong, Kakarbhitta (Nepal), Sonada, and Kalimpong. The fare has risen recently to Rs. 200 for Siliguri, Kurseong and Darjeeling (2025) and Rs 250* for Kakarvitta and Sonada (2025) per passenger. One can hire a taxi at a cost of Rs. 1700 to 2500 for Darjeeling, Kurseong, Siliguri and Kakarbhitta(Nepal)*. Shared taxis also operate from Darjeeling, Siliguri, Kurseong, Sonada and Kakarbhitta to Mirik.

Shared taxis are operated from Mirik by Mirik Tours & Travels (Krishnanagar). Taxis are available for internal transportation within Mirik to travel from Mirik Lake (Krishnanagar) to Mirik Bazar at Rs. 20 per head.

== Accommodation ==
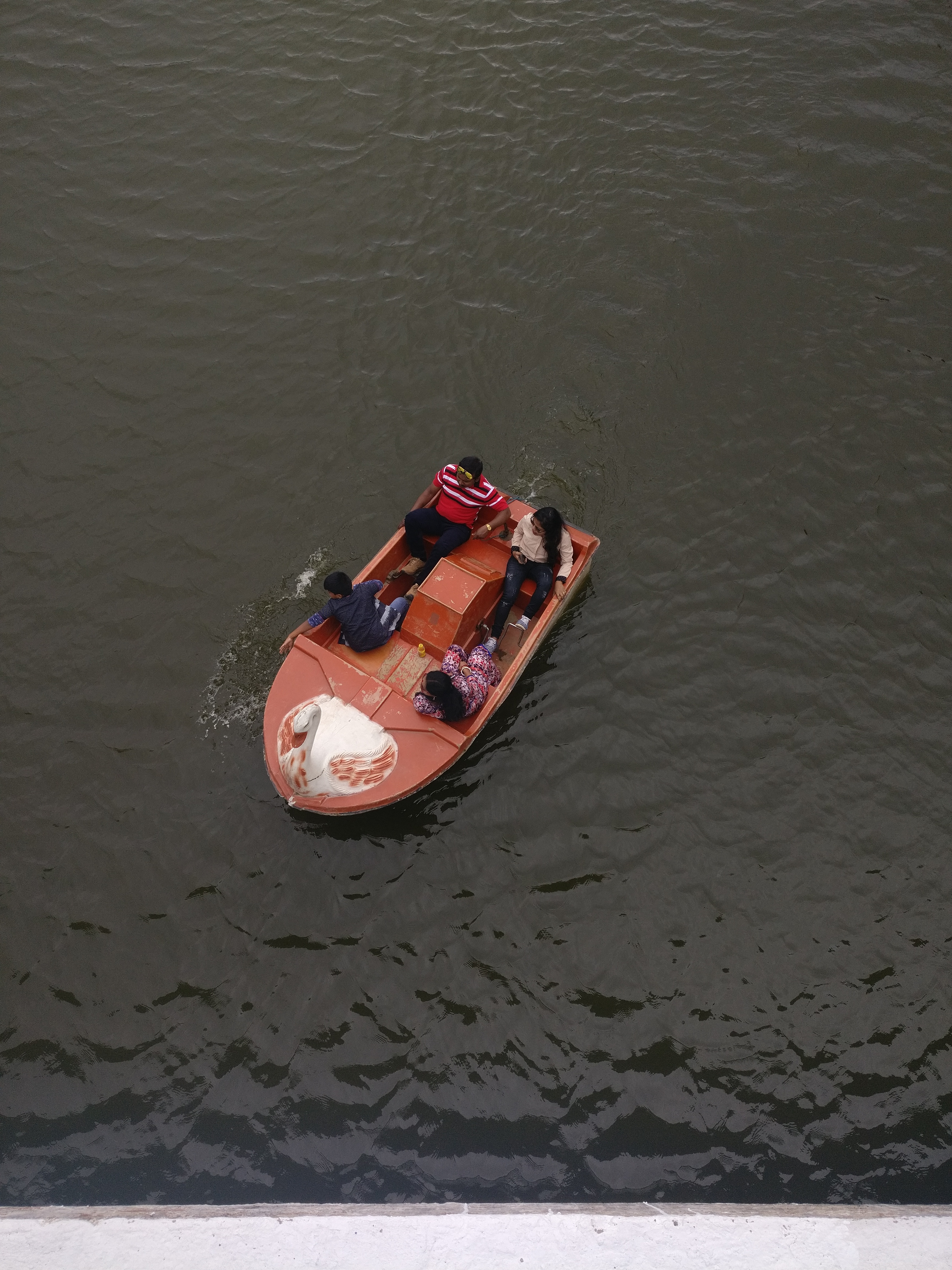
Tourists boating in Mirik Lake

Mirik Bazar, Thana Line, Krishnanagar, Deuseydara, Thurbo, Mirik Busty and Byapari Golai are some localities in Mirik where accommodation is available for tourists such as Lake View Villa. However, the majority of the hotels and restaurants are in the Krishnanagar area of Mirik. The Gorkhaland Territorial Administration operates a motel at a hilltop near the helipad at Ahalay and another tourist lodge located near the lake. There are other good hotels in Krishnanagar and some hotels in Mirik Bazar. There are many lodges and private guest houses. There is a Forest Rest House in Mirik that can be booked from the District Forest Office, Kurseong. There is also a PWD (Public Works Department) Inspection Bungalow near the lake that can be booked from Siliguri PWD office.

There are also many home stays that have started sprouting in the region owing to the large number of tourists who flock in.

== Getting around ==
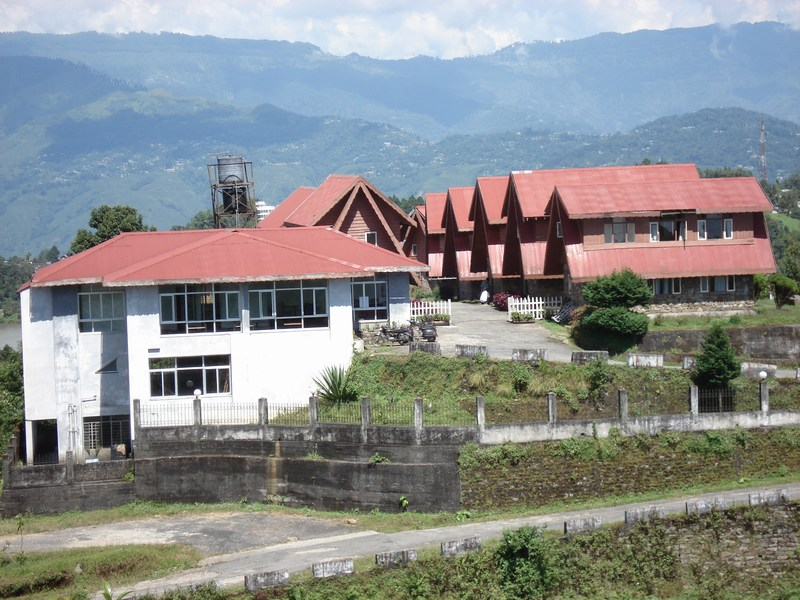
Mirik Motel.

- Sumendu Lake - It is the heart of Mirik. There is an 80-ft (24-m) long footbridge over the lake. One can boat in the lake or take a horse ride around the lake.
- Rameetay Dara - A viewpoint near the town from where one can see the surrounding mountains and the vast plains below.
- Bokar Monastery - It is located on the way to Rameetay Dara and is a Buddhist meditation center.
- Rai Dhap - Source of drinking water for Mirik and a picnic spot.
- Debisthan - A temple of a Hindu goddess located on a hillock near the Sumendu lake.
- Tingling View Point - A panoramic view of the tea gardens can be seen from here.
- Tea Gardens - A number of tea gardens produce Darjeeling tea specially Thurbo, Soureni, Gopaldhara, Singbulli, Okayti and Phuguri are located in and around Mirik.
- Manjushree Park - 20 mins drive from Mirik. Suitable for children and peace-seekers.

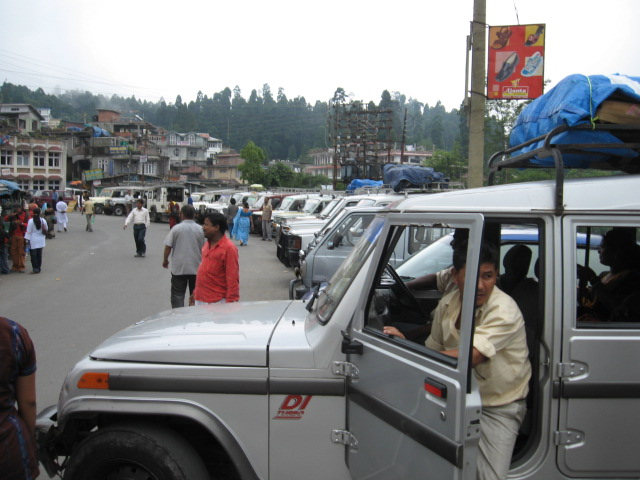
Tourist vehicles at Mirik.

- Orange Orchards - Mirik is known for its high-quality oranges. These are grown in Mirik Busty, Murmah and Soureni Busty.
- Orchids - Mirik has one of the best climate for a typical orchid called Cymbidium orchids, which fetches one of the highest prices in the world flower markets. One such Cymbidium orchid garden is "Darjeeling Gardens Pvt. Ltd." located in Rato Mate in Mirik.
- Bunkulung (Jayanti Nagar) - Ecotourism is being promoted here and several home-stay facilities are available.
- Pashupatinagar - This border market with Nepal is a commercial center for trade in clothes, electronic and household goods.
- Don Bosco Church- It is located near Don Bosco School. One of the bigger Catholic churches of Darjeeling district.
- Mirik Church (UCNI) - This is the oldest Church in Mirik, situated at Deosay Dara, Ward No. IV, Mirik. The church building being was constructed in 1962. The same old building still exists today. The church remains open every day for everyone. While Service starts at 11:00 am onwards. The Church is in close proximity with Darjeeling Hills Bible School (DHBS) which was the first school offering theological training in nepali language since 1954.

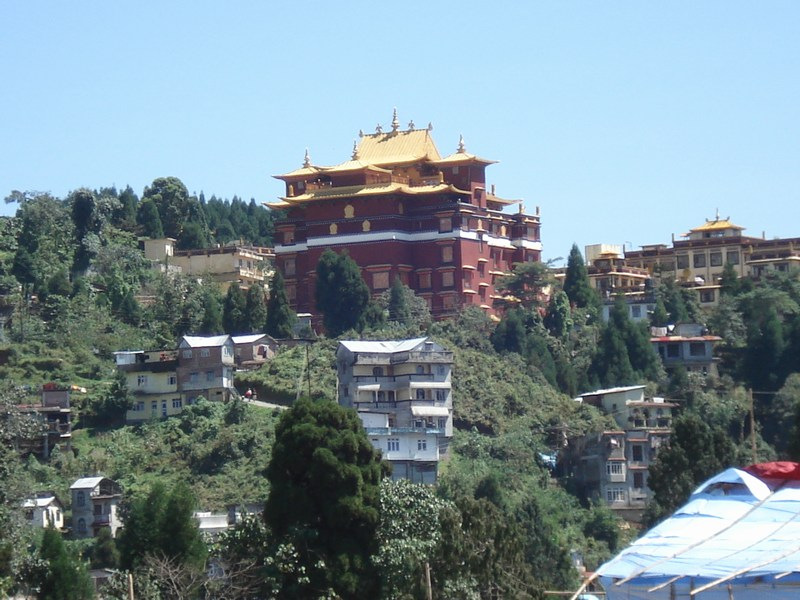
Buddhist Monastery in Mirik.

== CBSE affiliated Schools ==
- Snowdrops School (English medium) CBSE (Co-Ed)

== CISCE Affiliated Schools ==
- Glenmore International School (English medium)(Co-Ed)
- Brindavan Boarding School (English medium)(Co-Ed)
- Orange Lake School (English medium)(Co-Ed)
- Lewis English School (English medium)(Co-Ed)
- Green Lawn School (English medium)(Co-Ed)
- Wood Lands Academy (English Medium)(Co-Ed)
- Pinehall Academy (English Medium)(Co-Ed)
- Temple of Wisdom (English Medium)(Co-Ed)

== WBBSE and WBCHSE affiliated Schools ==
- Don Bosco School (English medium) Madhyamik (WBBSE)(Co-Ed)
- Mirik Higher Secondary School (English medium) Madhyamik (WBBSE) and Higher Secondary (WBCHSE); Vocational Education Travel and Tourism course (affiliated to W.B.S.C.V.E.T.)(Co-Ed)
- Soureni Rabindranath High School (Nepali medium) Madhyamik (WBBSE) and HS (WBCHSE)(Co-Ed)
- Phuguri High School (Nepali medium) Madhyamik (WBBSE) and HS (WBCHSE)(Co-Ed)
- Thurbo High School, 9th Mile (Nepali medium) Madhayamik (WBBSE) and HS (WBCHSE)(Co-Ed)
- Rasdal Gaon Junior High School (English medium) Madhayamik (WBBSE)(Co-Ed)
- Murmah Prem Sundar High School (Nepali medium) Madhayamik (WBBSE)(Co-Ed)
- Jogpal Jr High School (English Medium) Madhyamik (WBBSE)(Co-Ed)
- Sophies Academy (Nepali and English medium), Secondary and Senior Secondary (NIOS)(Co-Ed)
