= Panighatta =

Panighatta Chenga Panighata
- Tea Estate Village
- Panighata
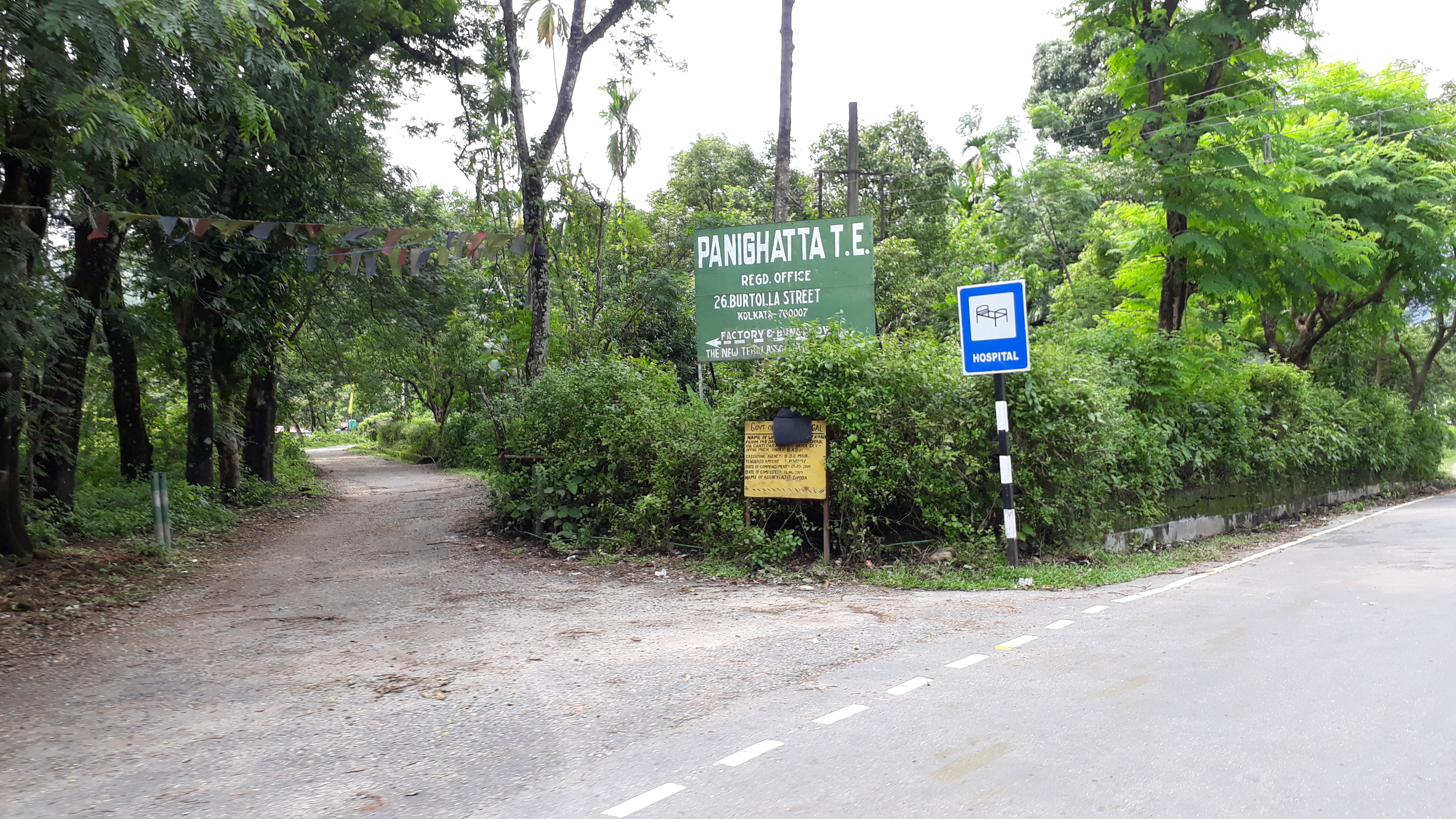

- Location within West Bengal Location within India
- Coordinates: 26.7833333°N 88.240343°E
- Country: India
- State: West Bengal
- District: Darjeeling
- Lok Sabha constituency: Darjeeling
- Vidhan Sabha constituency: Kurseong
- Administrative Body: Gorkhaland Territorial Administration

Population (2011)
  - Total: 5,235
- PIN: 734423
- Telephone/STD code: 0353
- Website: darjeeling.gov.in

Panighatta, or Panighata (English translation: Water mill), is a Tea Estate village on the banks of Balason River and the foothills of the Himalayan Mountains. Panighatta falls under the Mirik sub-division of Darjeeling district and is situated about 26 kilometers from Mirik and 32 km from Siliguri in the state of West Bengal in India.

== Geography ==
Places and tea estates in the southern portion of Darjeeling Sadar subdivision (including Jorebunglow Sukhiapokhri CD block), and Mirik Subdivision in Darjeeling district
CT: census town, R: rural/ urban centre, NP: national park/ wildlife sanctuary, TE: tea estate
Abbreviations used in names – TG for Tea Garden (town/village), TE for Tea Estate
Owing to space constraints in the small map, the actual locations in a larger map may vary slightly

=== Location ===
Panighatta is located at 26.783333°N 88.240343°E.

The total geographical area of Panighatta village is 9 km^{2} (3.5 sq mi) and is the fourth-biggest village by area in the sub-division.

=== Area overview ===
The map alongside shows a part of the southern portion of the Darjeeling Himalayan hill region in the Darjeeling district. In the Darjeeling Sadar subdivision 61.00% of the total population lives in the rural areas and 39.00% of the population lives in the urban areas. In the Mirik subdivision 80.11% of the total population lives in the rural areas and 19.89% lives in the urban areas. There are 78 tea gardens/ estates (the figure varies slightly according to different sources), in the district, producing and largely exporting Darjeeling tea. It engages a large proportion of the population directly/ indirectly. Some tea gardens were identified in the 2011 census as census towns or villages. Such places are marked in the map as CT (census town) or R (rural/ urban center). Specific tea estate pages are marked TE.

Note: The map alongside presents some of the notable locations in the subdivision. All places marked in the map are linked in the larger full screen map.

== Demographics ==
According to the 2011 Census of India, Panighatta had a total population of 5,235 of which 2,595 (50%) were males and 2,640 (50%) were females. There were 438 persons in the age range of 0 to 6 years. The total number of literate people in Panighatta was 3,588 (68.54% of the population over 6 years).

=== Languages spoken ===
Nepali and Hindi.

== Tea ==
Panighatta Tea Estate employs about 750 permanent and 400 casual staff. The estate is spread over 900 acres and produces about 5.5 lakh kg tea annually.

== Transport ==
Service	Name	Location	Distance
Railway Station	Siliguri Junction	Siliguri	28 km
Railway Station	New Jalpaiguri Junction (NJP)	New Jalpaiguri	32 km
Airport	Bagdogra Airport	Bagdogra	19 km
Bus Terminal	Tenzing Norgay Bus Terminus	Siliguri	28 km

== Notable persons ==
Rangu Souriya

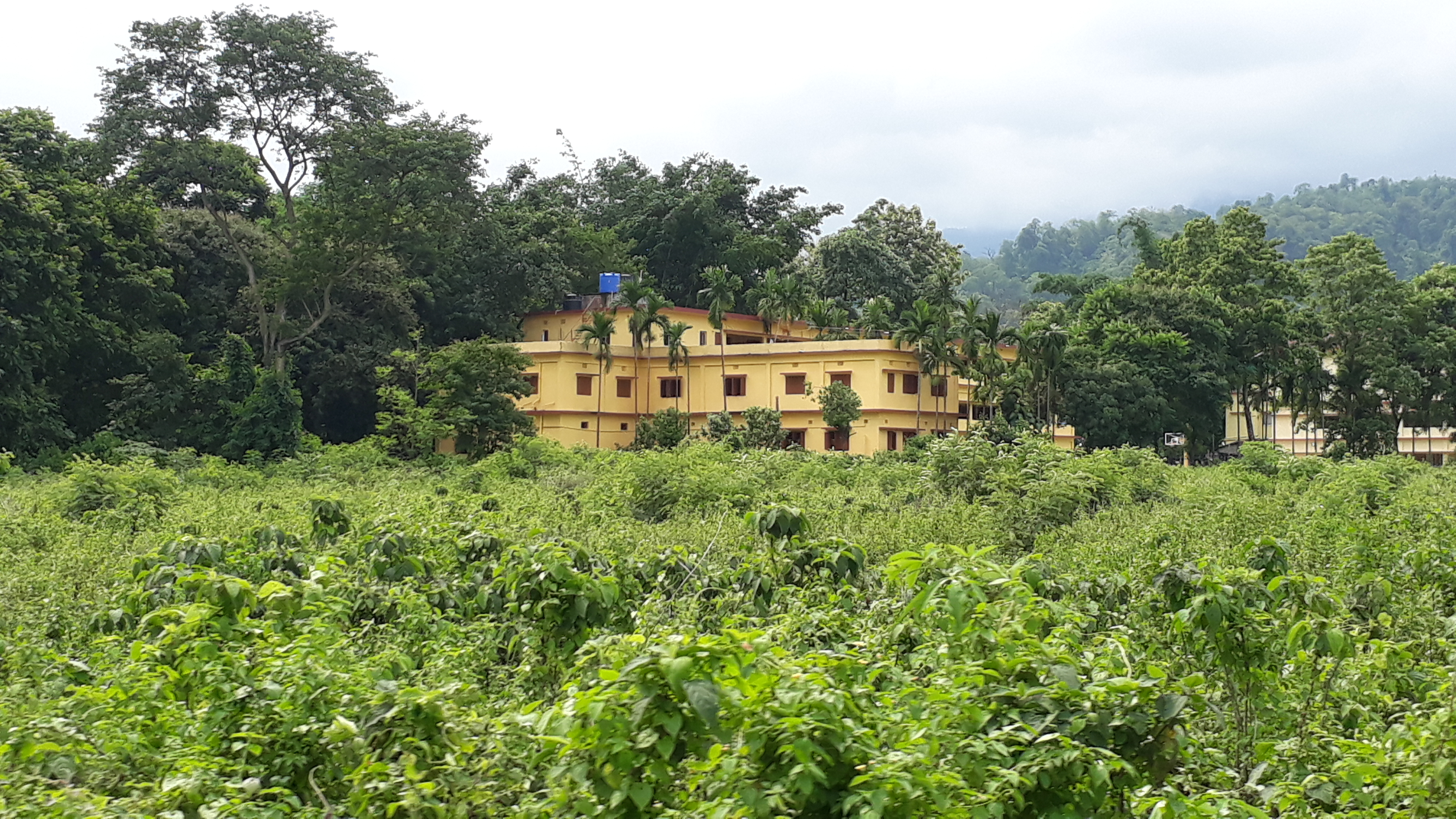
Loreto High School, Panighatta

== Education ==
Loreto School Panighatta is an English-medium coeducational institution established in 1995. It has facilities for teaching from nursery to class X. It is affiliated with the West Bengal Board of Secondary Education.

Rainbow High School is an English-medium coeducational institution established in 1980. It has facilities for teaching from class Nursery to class X. It has 20 computers, a library with 1,000 books and a playground.
