= Mirik Lake =

Lake in West Bengal, India

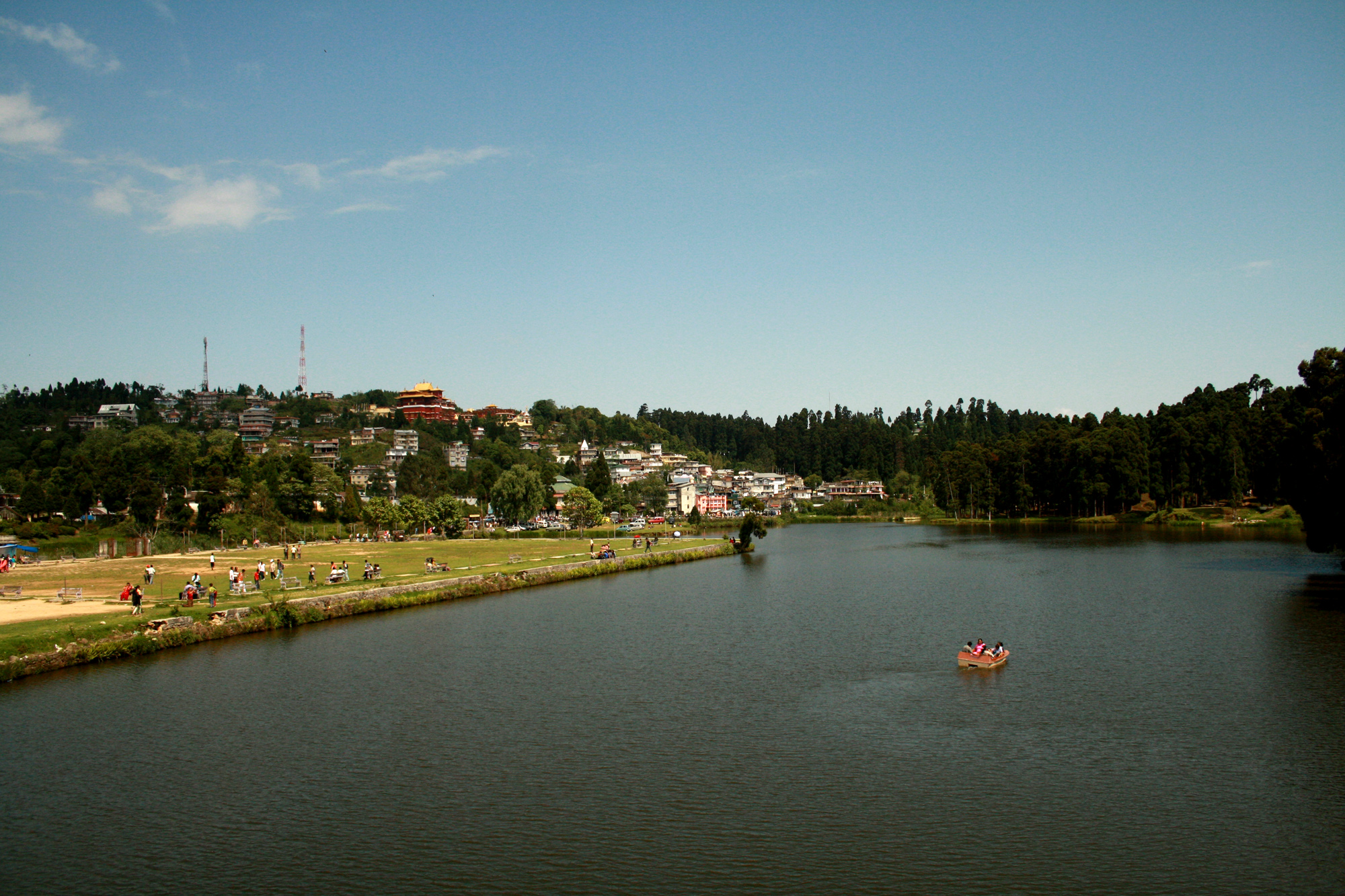
- Mirik Sumendu Lake

- Location within India
- Location: Mirik, Darjeeling district, West Bengal, India
- Coordinates: 26°53′22″N 88°10′58″E
- Max. length: 1.25 kilometres (0.78 mi)

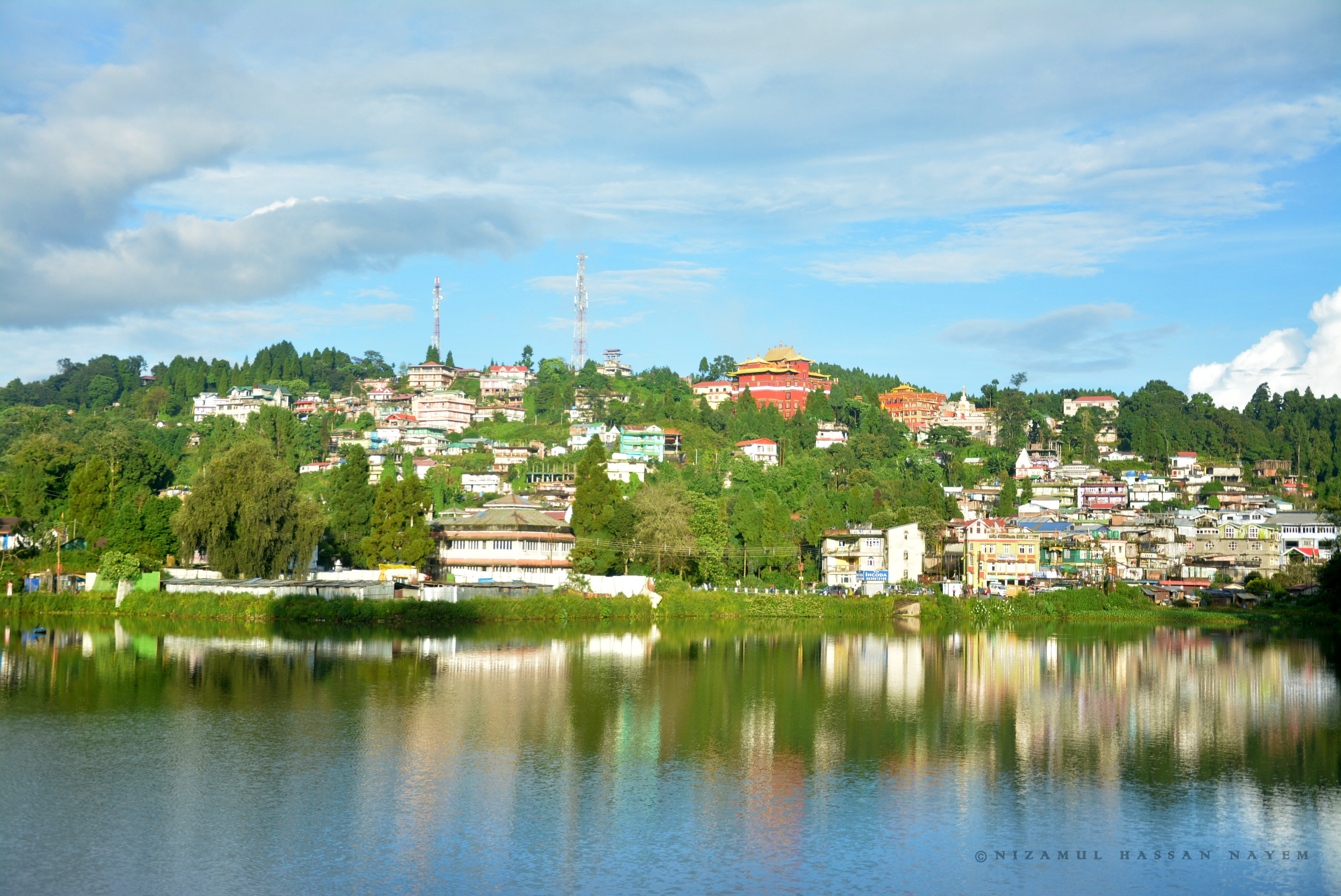
Beautiful Mirik

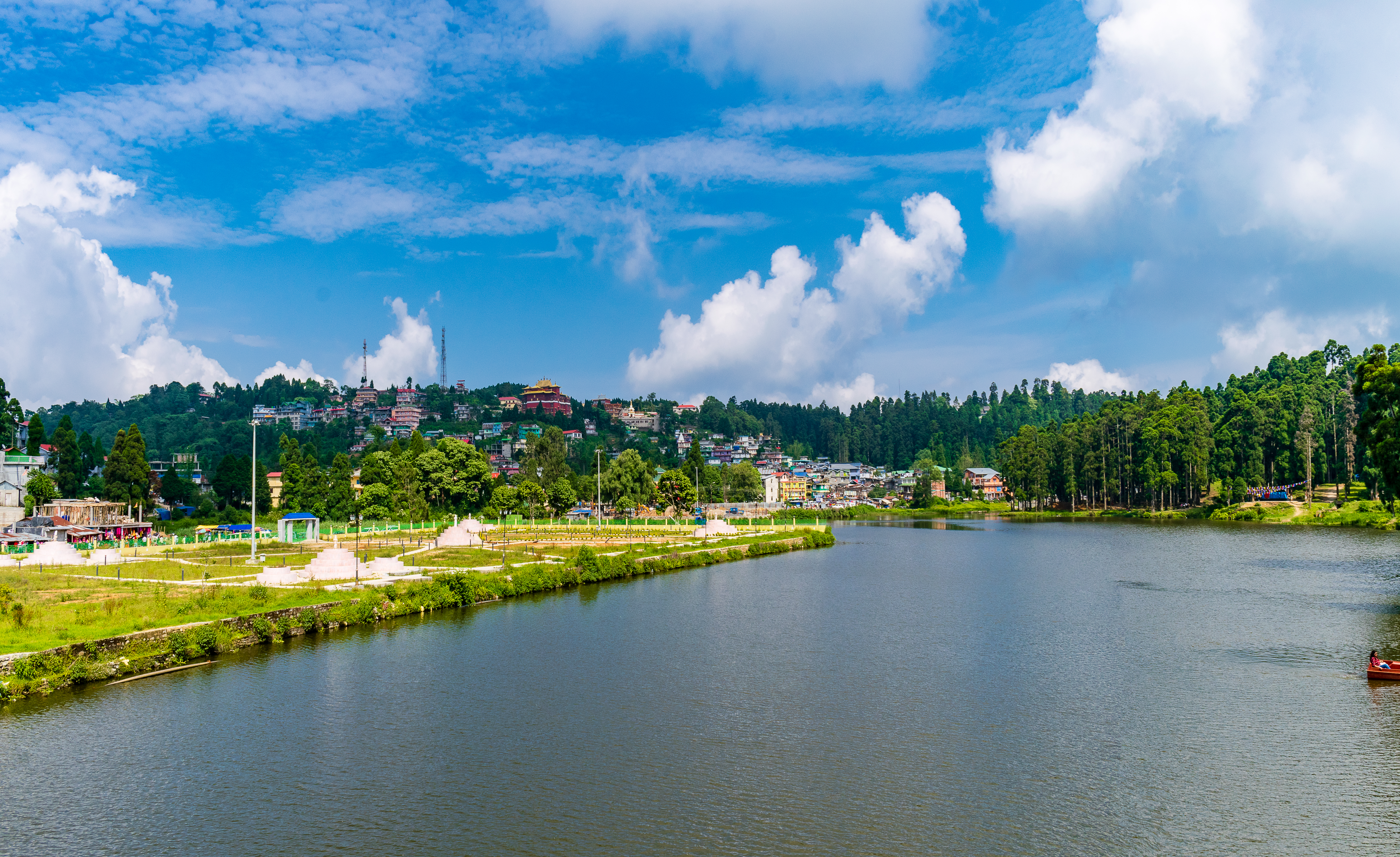
A bright sunny day on Mirik Lake

Mirik Lake, or Sumendu Lake, is a lake in Mirik, Darjeeling district, West Bengal, India. It is 1.25 kilometres (0.78 mi) long. There is an 80-metre-long (260 ft) arch footbridge across the lake called the Indreni Pull.

== See also ==
- Chowrasta Darjeeling
