= Mirik subdivision =

- Subdivision
- Coordinates: 26.885°N 88.187°E
- Country: India
- State: West Bengal
- District: Darjeeling
- Headquarters: Mirik

Area
  - Total: 125.89 km^{2} (48.61 sq mi)

Population
  - Total: 57,887
  - Density: 459.82/km^{2} (1,190.9/sq mi)

Languages
  - Official: Bengali, Nepali
- Time zone: UTC+5:30 (IST)

Mirik subdivision is a subdivision of the Darjeeling district in the state of West Bengal, India. It was declared a subdivision on 30 March 2017.

== Subdivisions ==
Darjeeling district is divided into the following administrative subdivisions:

Subdivision	Headquarters	Area km^{2}	Population (2011)	Rural Population % (2011)	Urban Population % (2011)
Darjeeling Sadar	Darjeeling	921.68	429,391	61.00	39.00
Kurseong	Kurseong	377.35	136,793	58.41	41.59
Mirik	Mirik	125.68	57,887	80.11	19.89
Siliguri	Siliguri	802.01	971,120	55.11	44.89
Darjeeling district	Darjeeling	2,226.72	1,595,191	57.89	42.11

Places and tea estates in the southern portion of Darjeeling Sadar subdivision (including Jorebunglow Sukhiapokhri CD block), and Mirik Subdivision in Darjeeling district
CT: census town, R: rural/ urban centre, NP: national park/ wildlife sanctuary, TE: tea estate
Abbreviations used in names – TG for Tea Garden (town/village), TE for Tea Estate
Owing to space constraints in the small map, the actual locations in a larger map may vary slightly

== Police stations ==
Police stations in the Mirik subdivision have the following features and jurisdiction:

Police Station	Area covered km^{2}	International border	Inter-state border km	Municipal Town	CD block
Mirik	n/a	*	-	Mirik	Mirik

.* The total length of border with Nepal (Mechi River) is 101.02 km (62.77 mi).

== Blocks ==
Community development blocks in Mirik subdivision are:

CD block	Headquarters	Area km^{2}	Population (2011)	SC %	ST %	Literacy Rate %	Census Towns
Mirik	Mirik	119.18	46,374	7.80	30.79	80.84	-

== Demographics ==
Religion in Mirik sub-division (2011)
1. Hinduism (66.6%)
2. Buddhism (22.1%)
3. Christianity (7.32%)
4. Islam (0.60%)
5. Others (3.30%)

According to the 2011 census, Hindus numbered 38,576 and formed 66.64% of the population. Buddhists numbered 12,816 and formed 22.14% of the population. Christians numbered 4,239 and formed 7.32% of the population. Muslims numbered 346 and formed 0.60% of the population. Others numbered 1,910 and formed 3.30% of the population.

Languages spoken in Mirik Taluka, 2011
1. Nepali (92.0%)
2. Kurukh (3.11%)
3. Bengali (2.73%)
4. Sadri (2.20%)

== Gram panchayats ==
Gram panchayats in Mirik subdivision are :

- Mirik block consists of rural areas with 6 gram panchayats, viz. Chenga Panighata, Paheligaon School Dara-I, Paheligaon School Dara-II, Soureni-I, Soureni-II and Duptin.

== Education ==
Given in the table below is a comprehensive picture of the education scenario in Darjeeling district, with data for the year 2012–13.

Subdivision	Primary School		Middle School		High School		Higher Secondary School		General College, Univ		Technical / Professional Instt		Non-formal Education	
Subdivision	Institution	Student	Institution	Student	Institution	Student	Institution	Student	Institution	Student	Institution	Student	Institution	Student
Darjeeling Sadar	579	37,345	28	8,019	37	22,579	23	16,492	7	9,510	6	1,095	1,142	28,425
Kurseong	218	13,031	3	721	28	10,596	9	7,783	1	2,034	4	866	367	14,261
Mirik	78	7,211	3	919	6	2,131	2	2,127	1	715	-	-	309	20,265
Siliguri	676	79,713	30	8,585	46	23,903	67	100,845	10	13,398	13	3,161	1,793	96,766
Darjeeling district	1,551	137,300	64	18,244	117	59,290	101	127,247	19	25,657	23	5,122	3,611	159,717

Note: Primary schools include junior basic schools; middle schools, high schools and higher secondary schools include madrasahs; technical schools include junior technical schools, junior government polytechnics, industrial technical institutes, industrial training centres, nursing training institutes etc.; technical and professional colleges include engineering colleges, medical colleges, para-medical institutes, management colleges, teachers training and nursing training colleges, law colleges, art colleges, music colleges etc. Special and non-formal education centres include sishu siksha kendras, madhyamik siksha kendras, centres of Rabindra mukta vidyalaya, recognised Sanskrit tols, institutions for the blind and other handicapped persons, Anganwadi centres, reformatory schools etc.

=== Educational institutions ===
The following institution in located in Mirik subdivision:

== Healthcare ==
The table below (all data in numbers) presents an overview of the medical facilities available and patients treated in the hospitals, health centres and sub-centres in 2013 in Darjeeling district, with data for the year 2012–13.:

Subdivision	Health & Family Welfare Deptt, WB				Other State Govt Deptts	Local bodies	Central Govt Deptts / PSUs	NGO / Private Nursing Homes	Total	Total Number of Beds	Total Number of Doctors*	Indoor Patients	Outdoor Patients
Subdivision	Hospitals	Rural Hospitals	Block Primary Health Centres	Primary Health Centres	Other State Govt Deptts	Local bodies	Central Govt Deptts / PSUs	NGO / Private Nursing Homes	Total	Total Number of Beds	Total Number of Doctors*	Indoor Patients	Outdoor Patients
Darjeeling Sadar	3	2	1	6	1	-	-	3	16	729	32	22,584	149,465
Kurseong	4	1	-	3	-	-	1	-	9	554	22	9,097	132,488
Mirik	-	1	0	3	-	-	-	-	4	42	44	2,354	57,243
Siliguri	3	3	1	4	1	-	4	47	63	1,146	168	133,086	1,738,671
Darjeeling district	10	7	2	16	2	-	5	50	92	2,471	266	167,121	1,738.671

.* Excluding nursing homes.

=== Medical facilities ===
Medical facilities in Mirik subdivision are as follows:

Rural Hospitals: (Name, CD block, location, beds)

- Mirik Rural Hospital, Mirik CD block, Mirik, 30 beds

Primary Health Centres : (CD block-wise)(CD block, PHC location, beds)

- Mirik CD block: Sourani Bustee (10), Duptin (PO Mirik) (2), Panighatta (OPD only)

== Legislative segments ==
As per order of the Delimitation Commission in respect of the delimitation of constituencies in West Bengal, the whole area under this subdivision, viz. Mirik block and Mirik municipality/notified area is part of the Kurseong assembly constituency of West Bengal. This constituency is an assembly segment of Darjeeling Lok Sabha constituency.
