= Shakhenat District =

District in South Khorasan province, Iran

Shakhenat District Persian: بخش شاخنات
- District
- Location within Iran
- Coordinates: 33°22′N 59°29′E
- Country: Iran
- Province: South Khorasan
- County: Birjand
- Established: 2021
- Capital: Gazar
- Time zone: UTC+3:30 (IRST)

Shakhenat District (Persian: بخش شاخنات) is in Birjand County, South Khorasan province, Iran. Its capital is the village of Gazar, whose population at the time of the 2016 National Census was 622 people in 224 households.

== History ==
In 2021, Shakhen and Shakhenat Rural Districts were separated from the Central District in the formation of Shakhenat District.

== Demographics ==
=== Administrative divisions ===
Shakhenat District
Administrative Divisions
Shakhen RD
Shakhenat RD
RD = Rural District
