= Taqiabad =

Taqiabad (Persian: تقی‌آباد), sometimes also written Takiabad or Taghiabad, may refer to:

== Fars Province ==
- Taqiabad, Fars, a village in Jahrom County

== Gilan Province ==
- Takiabad, Gilan, a village in Talesh County

== Hamadan Province ==
- Taqiabad, Hamadan, a village in Tuyserkan County

== Isfahan Province ==
- Taqiabad, Chadegan, a village in Chadegan County
- Taqiabad, Karvan, a village in Tiran and Karvan County

== Kerman Province ==
- Taqiabad, Bardsir, a village in Bardsir County
- Taqiabad, Rafsanjan, a village in Rafsanjan County
- Taqiabad, Ravar, a village in Ravar County
- Taqiabad, Rigan, a village in Rigan County
- Taqiabad, Zarand, a village in Zarand County

== Khuzestan Province ==
- Taqiabad, Khuzestan, a village in Masjed Soleyman County

== Kurdistan Province ==
- Taqiabad, Kurdistan, a village in Qorveh County

== Lorestan Province ==
- Taqiabad, Dorud, a village in Dorud County
- Taqiabad, Khorramabad, a village in Khorramabad County
- Taqiabad-e Kan Kot, a village in Delfan County

== Mazandaran Province ==
- Taqiabad, Mazandaran, a village in Tonekabon County

== North Khorasan Province ==
- Taqiabad (Naqiabad), North Khorasan

== Razavi Khorasan Province ==
- Taqiabad, Fariman, a village in Fariman County
- Taqiabad, Firuzeh, a village in Firuzeh County
- Taqiabad, Kalat, a village in Kalat County
- Taqiabad, Mashhad, a village in Mashhad County
- Taqiabad, Nishapur, a village in Nishapur County
- Taqiabad, Quchan Atiq, a village in Quchan County
- Taqiabad, Torbat-e Jam, a village in Torbat-e Jam County

== Semnan Province ==
- Taqiabad, Aradan, a village in Aradan County

== Sistan and Baluchestan Province ==
- Taqiabad, Sistan and Baluchestan, a village in Khash County

== South Khorasan Province ==
- Taqiabad, Khusf, a village in Khusf County
- Taqiabad, Qaleh Zari, a village in Khusf County

== Tehran Province ==
- Taqiabad-e Shahrestan

== Yazd Province ==
- Taqiabad, Abarkuh, a village in Abarkuh County
- Taqiabad, Behabad, a village in Behabad County
- Taqiabad, Aliabad, a village in Taft County
- Taqiabad, Dehshir, a village in Taft County
