= Gusheh =

Gusheh (Persian: گوشه, lit.: corner) may refer to:

- Dastgah, a Persian musical system
- Gusheh, Farsan, a village in Chaharmahal and Bakhtiari Province, Iran
- Gusheh, Kiar, a village in Chaharmahal and Bakhtiari Province, Iran
- Gusheh, Lordegan, a village in Chaharmahal and Bakhtiari Province, Iran
- Gusheh, Hamadan, a village in Hamadan Province, Iran
- Gusheh-ye Badi ol Zaman, a village in Hamadan Province, Iran
- Gusheh-ye Sad-e Vaqas, a village in Hamadan Province, Iran
- Gusheh, Khuzestan, a village in Khuzestan Province, Iran
- Gusheh-ye Shahzadeh Qasem, a village in Kohgiluyeh and Boyer-Ahmad Province, Iran
- Gusheh, Dorud, a village in Lorestan Province, Iran
- Shahanshah, Lorestan, a village in Lorestan Province, Iran
- Gusheh, Markazi, a village in Markazi Province, Iran
- Gusheh-ye Mohammad Malek, a village in Markazi Province, Iran
- Qusheh, a village in Semnan Province, Iran
- Gusheh-ye Olya (disambiguation)
- Gusheh-ye Sofla (disambiguation)

== See also ==
- Kusheh (disambiguation)
