= Khvor, South Khorasan =

Village in South Khorasan province, Iran

Khvor Persian: خور
- Village
- Location within Iran
- Coordinates: 32°56′05″N 58°26′15″E
- Country: Iran
- Province: South Khorasan
- County: Khusf
- District: Central
- Rural District: Khvor

Population (2016)
  - Total: 1,010
- Time zone: UTC+3:30 (IRST)

Khvor (Persian: خور) (Note: Also romanized as Khowr and Khūr) is a village in, and the capital of, Khvor Rural District in the Central District of Khusf County, South Khorasan province, Iran.

== Demographics ==
=== Population ===
At the time of the 2006 National Census, the village's population was 813 in 228 households, when it was in Khusf Rural District of the former Khusf District in Birjand County. The following census in 2011 counted 665 people in 170 households. The 2016 census measured the population of the village as 1,010 people in 175 households, by which time the district had been separated from the county in the establishment of Khusf County. The rural district was transferred to the new Central District, and Khvor was transferred to Khvor Rural District created in the same district. It was the most populous village in its rural district.
