= Kusheh =

Kusheh or Kushah (Persian: كوشه) may refer to:

- Kushah, Hormozgan
- Kusheh, Kermanshah
- Kusheh, Bardaskan, Razavi Khorasan Province
- Kusheh, Kashmar, Razavi Khorasan Province
- Kusheh, Sistan and Baluchestan
- Kusheh, South Khorasan
- Gusheh-ye Olya, South Khorasan
- Gusheh-ye Sofla, South Khorasan

== See also ==
- Gusheh (disambiguation)
- Kusheh (disambiguation)
- Qusheh
- Kusheh Nama
