= Deym =

Village in South Khorasan province, Iran

Deym Persian: ديم
- Village
- Location within Iran
- Coordinates: 33°06′36″N 58°40′44″E
- Country: Iran
- Province: South Khorasan
- County: Khusf
- District: Central
- Rural District: Khvor

Population (2016)
  - Total: Below reporting threshold
- Time zone: UTC+3:30 (IRST)

Deym (Persian: ديم) (Note: Also romanized as Dīm; also known as Dā’em, Dahm, Dāim, and Dāyem) is a village in Khvor Rural District of the Central District in Khusf County, South Khorasan province, Iran.

== Demographics ==
=== Population ===
At the time of the 2006 National Census, the village's population was 34 in 11 households, when it was in Khusf Rural District of the former Khusf District in Birjand County. The following census in 2011 counted 25 people in seven households. The 2016 census measured the population of the village as below the reporting threshold, by which time the district had been separated from the county in the establishment of Khusf County. The rural district was transferred to the new Central District, and Deym was transferred to Khvor Rural District created in the same district.
