= Salak, Iran =

Village in South Khorasan province, Iran

Salak Persian: صلك
- Village
- Location within Iran
- Coordinates: 32°58′18″N 58°41′18″E
- Country: Iran
- Province: South Khorasan
- County: Khusf
- District: Central
- Rural District: Khvor

Population (2016)
  - Total: 37
- Time zone: UTC+3:30 (IRST)

Salak (Persian: صلك) (Note: Also romanized as Salaḵ) is a village in Khvor Rural District of the Central District in Khusf County, South Khorasan province, Iran.

== Demographics ==
=== Population ===
At the time of the 2006 National Census, the village's population was 41 in 11 households, when it was in Khusf Rural District of the former Khusf District in Birjand County. The following census in 2011 counted 27 people in six households. The 2016 census measured the population of the village as 37 people in 10 households, by which time the district had been separated from the county in the establishment of Khusf County. The rural district was transferred to the new Central District, and Salak was transferred to Khvor Rural District created in the same district.
