= Hami, Iran =

Village in South Khorasan province, Iran

Hami Persian: حامی
- Village
- Location within Iran
- Coordinates: 33°01′09″N 58°39′42″E
- Country: Iran
- Province: South Khorasan
- County: Khusf
- District: Central
- Rural District: Khvor

Population (2016)
  - Total: 97
- Time zone: UTC+3:30 (IRST)

Hami (Persian: حامی) (Note: Also romanized as Ḩāmī; also known as Kāmi) is a village in Khvor Rural District of the Central District in Khusf County, South Khorasan province, Iran.

== Demographics ==
=== Population ===
At the time of the 2006 National Census, the village's population was 95 in 29 households, when it was in Khusf Rural District of the former Khusf District in Birjand County. The following census in 2011 counted 77 people in 26 households. The 2016 census measured the population of the village as 97 people in 35 households, by which time the district had been separated from the county in the establishment of Khusf County. The rural district was transferred to the new Central District, and Hami was transferred to Khvor Rural District created in the same district.
