= Gol, South Khorasan =

Village in South Khorasan province, Iran

Gol Persian: گل
- Village
- Location within Iran
- Coordinates: 32°41′22″N 59°10′09″E
- Country: Iran
- Province: South Khorasan
- County: Khusf
- District: Jolgeh-ye Mazhan
- Rural District: Barakuh

Population (2016)
  - Total: 489
- Time zone: UTC+3:30 (IRST)

Gol (Persian: گل) (Note: Also known as Gul) is a village in, and the capital of, Barakuh Rural District in Jolgeh-ye Mazhan District of Khusf County, South Khorasan province, Iran.

== Etymology ==
Gol's name is derived from factors such as the pleasant climate of the region, fertile soil and the growth of various fragrant flowers, crops and gardens, as well as the settlement of a tribe with this name in the region. At the entrance of Gol, a welcome sign has been installed by rural governors. Then, "Bahar" square is seen with a symbolic "Kharas" stone in the middle, which was used to separate straw from grain with the help of donkeys and cows in ancient times.

== History ==
It is said that about a few centuries ago, Gol had a much larger population than Khusf, due to better climate and the amount of groundwater. Due to its remoteness from transportation routes and successive droughts and the lack of attention of the rulers to the agricultural activities, its population has been declining throughout history. According to data obtained from elders of the village, the British and Russians were commuting in this place and there are still the remains of the caravanserais where they stopped and rested.

== Demographics ==
=== Population ===
At the time of the 2006 National Census, the village's population was 650 in 272 households, when it was in the former Khusf District of Birjand County. The following census in 2011 counted 471 people in 173 households. The 2016 census measured the population of the village as 489 people in 175 households, by which time the district had been separated from the county in the establishment of Khusf County. The rural district was transferred to the new Jolgeh-ye Mazhan District. Gol was the most populous village in its rural district.
