= Khanand =

Khvanand خوانند
- Village
- Location within Iran
- Coordinates: 32°18′24″N 59°09′07″E
- Country: Iran
- Province: South Khorasan
- County: Khusf
- Bakhsh: Jolgeh-e Mazhan
- Rural District: Qaleh Zari

Population (2006)
  - Total: 14
- Time zone: UTC+3:30 (IRST)
  - Summer (DST): UTC+4:30 (IRDT)

Khvanand (Persian: خوانند, also Romanized as Khvānand; also known as Khanand, Khānind, Khūnand, and Khvānad) is a village in Qaleh Zari Rural District, Jolgeh-e Mazhan District, Khusf County, South Khorasan Province, Iran. At the 2006 census, its population was 14, in 7 families.
