= Tuti, South Khorasan =

Village in South Khorasan province, Iran

Tuti Persian: طوطي
- Village
- Location within Iran
- Coordinates: 33°01′08″N 58°31′55″E
- Country: Iran
- Province: South Khorasan
- County: Khusf
- District: Central
- Rural District: Khvor

Population (2016)
  - Total: 118
- Time zone: UTC+3:30 (IRST)

Tuti (Persian: طوطي) (Note: Also romanized as Ţūţī; also known as Kalāteh Tūtī, Kalāteh-ye Bāgh, and Kalāteh-ye Tūti) is a village in Khvor Rural District of the Central District in Khusf County, South Khorasan province, Iran.

== Demographics ==
=== Population ===
At the time of the 2006 National Census, the village's population was 137 in 39 households, when it was in Khusf Rural District of the former Khusf District in Birjand County. The following census in 2011 counted 87 people in 30 households. The 2016 census measured the population of the village as 118 people in 35 households, by which time the district had been separated from the county in the establishment of Khusf County. The rural district was transferred to the new Central District, and Tuti was transferred to Khvor Rural District created in the same district.
