= Givshad =

Village in South Khorasan province, Iran

Givshad Persian: گيوشاد
- Village
- Location within Iran
- Coordinates: 32°39′19″N 59°05′40″E
- Country: Iran
- Province: South Khorasan
- County: Khusf
- District: Jolgeh-ye Mazhan
- Rural District: Barakuh

Population (2016)
  - Total: 168
- Time zone: UTC+3:30 (IRST)

Givshad (Persian: گيوشاد) (Note: Also romanized as Gīvshād) is a village in Barakuh Rural District of Jolgeh-ye Mazhan District in Khusf County, South Khorasan province, Iran.

== Demographics ==
=== Population ===
At the time of the 2006 National Census, the village's population was 158 in 51 households, when it was in the former Khusf District of Birjand County. The following census in 2011 counted 171 people in 53 households. The 2016 census measured the population of the village as 168 people in 58 households, by which time the district had been separated from the county in the establishment of Khusf County. The rural district was transferred to the new Jolgeh-ye Mazhan District.
