= Zid =

Zid may refer to:

- Degtyarev Plant, abbreviated ЗиД (ZiD)
- Indianapolis Air Route Traffic Control Center, abbreviated ZID
- Zid, alternate name of Barmazid-e Sofla, a village in South Khorasan Province, Iran
- Zeyd, South Khorasan, a village in South Khorasan Province, Iran
- Zid (1976 film), a 1976 Indian Hindi-language romance film by Vijay, starring Sachin Pilgaonkar and Sarika
- Zid (1994 film), a 1994 Indian Hindi-language romantic drama film, starting Jay Mehta and Raageshwari
- Zid (2014 film), a 2014 Indian Hindi-language erotic-thriller film by Vivek Agnihotri
- Zid (TV series), on Hum TV a 2014 Pakistani TV Series
- Zid (TV series) on Express Entertainment, a 2014 Pakistani TV Series

== See also ==
- Ziddi (disambiguation)
- Zeyd (disambiguation)
