= Akbarabad, Khusf =

Village in South Khorasan province, Iran

Akbarabad Persian: اكبراباد
- Village
- Location within Iran
- Coordinates: 32°30′16″N 59°12′33″E
- Country: Iran
- Province: South Khorasan
- County: Khusf
- District: Jolgeh-ye Mazhan
- Rural District: Jolgeh-ye Mazhan

Population (2016)
  - Total: 258
- Time zone: UTC+3:30 (IRST)

Akbarabad (Persian: اكبراباد) (Note: Also romanized as Akbarābād; also known as Akbarābād-e Gīv) is a village in Jolgeh-ye Mazhan Rural District of Jolgeh-ye Mazhan District in Khusf County, South Khorasan province, Iran.

== Demographics ==
=== Population ===
At the time of the 2006 National Census, the village's population was 612 in 153 households, when it was in the former Khusf District of Birjand County. The following census in 2011 counted 360 people in 108 households. The 2016 census measured the population of the village as 258 people in 88 households, by which time the district had been separated from the county in the establishment of Khusf County. The rural district was transferred to the new Jolgeh-ye Mazhan District.
