= Qaleh Zari =

Village in South Khorasan province, Iran

Qaleh Zari Persian: قلعه زري
- Village
- Location within Iran
- Coordinates: 31°50′04″N 59°00′05″E
- Country: Iran
- Province: South Khorasan
- County: Khusf
- District: Jolgeh-ye Mazhan
- Rural District: Qaleh Zari

Population (2016)
  - Total: 0
- Time zone: UTC+3:30 (IRST)

Qaleh Zari (Persian: قلعه زري) (Note: Also romanized as Qal‘eh Zarī and Qal‘eh Zārī; also known as Chāh Qaleh Zari) is a village in Qaleh Zari Rural District of Jolgeh-ye Mazhan District in Khusf County, South Khorasan province, Iran.

== Demographics ==
=== Population ===
At the time of the 2006 National Census, the village's population was 1,651 in 395 households, when it was in the former Khusf District of Birjand County. The following census in 2011 counted 1,545 people in 403 households. The 2016 census measured the population of the village as zero, by which time the district had been separated from the county in the establishment of Khusf County. The rural district was transferred to the new Jolgeh-ye Mazhan District.
