= Fedeshk =

Village in South Khorasan province, Iran

Fedeshk Persian: فدشك
- Village
- Location within Iran
- Coordinates: 32°45′32″N 58°50′09″E
- Country: Iran
- Province: South Khorasan
- County: Khusf
- District: Central
- Rural District: Khusf

Population (2016)
  - Total: 690
- Time zone: UTC+3:30 (IRST)

Fedeshk (Persian: فدشك) (Note: Also romanized as Fadeshk; also known as Fidishk) is a village in Khusf Rural District of the Central District in Khusf County, South Khorasan province, Iran.

== Demographics ==
=== Population ===
At the time of the 2006 National Census, the village's population was 684 in 212 households, when it was in the former Khusf District of Birjand County. The following census in 2011 counted 667 people in 218 households. The 2016 census measured the population of the village as 690 people in 227 households, by which time the district had been separated from the county in the establishment of Khusf County. The rural district was transferred to the new Central District.
