= Karijgan =

Village in South Khorasan province, Iran

Karijgan Persian: كارجگان
- Village
- Location within Iran
- Coordinates: 32°35′42″N 58°56′01″E
- Country: Iran
- Province: South Khorasan
- County: Khusf
- District: Jolgeh-ye Mazhan
- Rural District: Jolgeh-ye Mazhan

Population (2016)
  - Total: 118
- Time zone: UTC+3:30 (IRST)

Karijgan (Persian: كارجگان) (Note: Also romanized as Kārījgān; also known as Gārchgan, Gārejgān, Gārījgān, Gārijgān, and Mobārakābād) is a village in Jolgeh-ye Mazhan Rural District of Jolgeh-ye Mazhan District in Khusf County, South Khorasan province, Iran.

== Demographics ==
=== Population ===
At the time of the 2006 National Census, the village's population was 146 in 37 households, when it was in the former Khusf District of Birjand County. The following census in 2011 counted 178 people in 47 households. The 2016 census measured the population of the village as 118 people in 46 households, by which time the district had been separated from the county in the establishment of Khusf County. The rural district was transferred to the new Jolgeh-ye Mazhan District.
