= Shams-e Bala =

Shams-e Bala شمس بالا
- Village
- Location within Iran
- Coordinates: 32°59′23″N 58°46′54″E
- Country: Iran
- Province: South Khorasan
- County: Khusf
- Bakhsh: Central District
- Rural District: Khusf

Population (2006)
  - Total: 63
- Time zone: UTC+3:30 (IRST)
  - Summer (DST): UTC+4:30 (IRDT)

Shams-e Bala (Persian: شمس بالا, also Romanized as Shams-e Bālā; also known as Shams-e ‘Olyā) is a village in Khusf Rural District, Central District, Khusf County, South Khorasan Province, Iran. At the 2006 census, its population was 63, in 20 families.
