= Jowmian =

Jowmian جوميان
- Village
- Location within Iran
- Coordinates: 32°47′39″N 58°53′51″E
- Country: Iran
- Province: South Khorasan
- County: Khusf
- Bakhsh: Central District
- Rural District: Khusf

Population (2006)
  - Total: 357
- Time zone: UTC+3:30 (IRST)
  - Summer (DST): UTC+4:30 (IRDT)

Jowmian (Persian: جوميان, also Romanized as Jowmīān and Jūmiān) is a village in Khusf Rural District, Central District, Khusf County, South Khorasan Province, Iran. At the 2006 census, its population was 357, in 103 families.
