= Rumenjan =

Rumenjan رومنجان
- Village
- Location within Iran
- Coordinates: 32°42′17″N 59°13′21″E
- Country: Iran
- Province: South Khorasan
- County: Khusf
- Bakhsh: Jolgeh-e Mazhan
- Rural District: Barakuh

Population (2006)
  - Total: 139
- Time zone: UTC+3:30 (IRST)
  - Summer (DST): UTC+4:30 (IRDT)

Rumenjan (Persian: رومنجان, also Romanized as Rūmenjān, Roomenjan, Rūmanjān, and Ruminjān; also known as Rūmījān) is a village in Barakuh Rural District, Jolgeh-e Mazhan District, Khusf County, South Khorasan Province, Iran. At the 2006 census, its population was 139, in 57 families.
