= Shahrestanak, South Khorasan =

Village in South Khorasan province, Iran

Shahrestanak Persian: شهرستانك
- Village
- Location within Iran
- Coordinates: 32°41′52″N 59°13′53″E
- Country: Iran
- Province: South Khorasan
- County: Khusf
- District: Jolgeh-ye Mazhan
- Rural District: Barakuh

Population (2016)
  - Total: 112
- Time zone: UTC+3:30 (IRST)

Shahrestanak (Persian: شهرستانك) (Note: Also romanized as Shahrestānak; also known as Shahristānak) is a village in Barakuh Rural District of Jolgeh-ye Mazhan District in Khusf County, South Khorasan province, Iran.

== Demographics ==
=== Population ===
At the time of the 2006 National Census, the village's population was 202 in 70 households, when it was in the former Khusf District of Birjand County. The following census in 2011 counted 96 people in 53 households. The 2016 census measured the population of the village as 112 people in 55 households, by which time the district had been separated from the county in the establishment of Khusf County. The rural district was transferred to the new Jolgeh-ye Mazhan District.
