= Zarkesh, South Khorasan =

Village in South Khorasan province, Iran

Zarkesh Persian: زركش
- Village
- Location within Iran
- Country: Iran
- Province: South Khorasan
- County: Khusf
- District: Central
- Rural District: Khvor

Population (2016)
  - Total: Below reporting threshold
- Time zone: UTC+3:30 (IRST)

Zarkesh (Persian: زركش) (Note: Also known as Zar Gesh and Zarkish) is a village in Khvor Rural District of the Central District in Khusf County, South Khorasan province, Iran.

== Demographics ==
=== Population ===
At the time of the 2006 National Census, the village's population was 22 in five households, when it was in Khusf Rural District of the former Khusf District in Birjand County. The following census in 2011 counted 17 people in eight households. The 2016 census measured the population of the village as below the reporting threshold, by which time the district had been separated from the county in the establishment of Khusf County. The rural district was transferred to the new Central District, and Zarkesh was transferred to Khvor Rural District created in the same district.
