= Yushu =

Yushu may refer to:

== China ==
- Yushu Tibetan Autonomous Prefecture (玉树藏族自治州), Qinghai
  - Yushu City, Qinghai (玉树市), a seat of Yushu Prefecture
  - Gyêgu (结古镇) or Yushu Town, a seat of Yushu City
  - Yushu Batang Airport, an airport in Yushu City
- Yushu, Jilin (榆树市), a city in Jilin
- Yushu Subdistrict, Panjin (榆树街道), in Dawa District, Panjin, Liaoning
- Yushu, Harbin (榆树镇), a town in and subdivision of Daoli District, Harbin, Heilongjiang

== Iran ==
- Yushu, Iran, in South Khorasan Province
- Yushu, an alternate name of Yush, South Khorasan

== Other ==
- Yushu horse, a horse breed from Tibet
- Yushu Kitano (1930–2016), Japanese freestyle wrestler

== See also ==
- 玉树 (disambiguation), transliterated as Yushu
- Yush (disambiguation)
- Hangzhou Yushu Technology or Unitree Robotics (宇树科技), a robotics company
