= Chahkand-e Gol =

Village in South Khorasan province, Iran

Chahkand-e Gol Persian: چهكندگل
- Village
- Location within Iran
- Coordinates: 32°40′35″N 59°12′37″E
- Country: Iran
- Province: South Khorasan
- County: Khusf
- District: Jolgeh-ye Mazhan
- Rural District: Barakuh

Population (2016)
  - Total: 192
- Time zone: UTC+3:30 (IRST)

Chahkand-e Gol (Persian: چهكندگل) is a village in Barakuh Rural District of Jolgeh-ye Mazhan District in Khusf County, South Khorasan province, Iran.

== Demographics ==
=== Population ===
At the time of the 2006 National Census, the village's population was 278 in 94 households, when it was in the former Khusf District of Birjand County. The following census in 2011 counted 236 people in 81 households. The 2016 census measured the population of the village as 192 people in 74 households, by which time the district had been separated from the county in the establishment of Khusf County. The rural district was transferred to the new Jolgeh-ye Mazhan District.
