= Nasrabad, Khusf =

Village in South Khorasan province, Iran

Nasrabad Persian: نصراباد
- Village
- Location within Iran
- Coordinates: 32°47′26″N 58°51′37″E
- Country: Iran
- Province: South Khorasan
- County: Khusf
- District: Central
- Rural District: Khusf

Population (2016)
  - Total: 666
- Time zone: UTC+3:30 (IRST)

Nasrabad (Persian: نصرآباد) (Note: Also romanized as Naşrābād; also known as Nasīrābād and Nasr Abad Gheis Abad) is a village in Khusf Rural District of the Central District in Khusf County, South Khorasan province, Iran.

== Demographics ==
=== Population ===
At the time of the 2006 National Census, the village's population was 585 in 153 households, when it was in the former Khusf District of Birjand County. The following census in 2011 counted 734 people in 221 households. The 2016 census measured the population of the village as 666 people in 200 households, by which time the district had been separated from the county in the establishment of Khusf County. The rural district was transferred to the new Central District.
