= Salmabad, Khusf =

Village in South Khorasan province, Iran

Salmabad Persian: سلم اباد
- Village
- Location within Iran
- Coordinates: 32°38′38″N 59°13′52″E
- Country: Iran
- Province: South Khorasan
- County: Khusf
- District: Jolgeh-ye Mazhan
- Rural District: Barakuh

Population (2016)
  - Total: 177
- Time zone: UTC+3:30 (IRST)

Salmabad (Persian: سلم اباد) (Note: Also romanized as Salmābād; also known as Salm Abad Barakooh, Sar-e Kārīz, and Sar-i-Kārīz) is a village in Barakuh Rural District of Jolgeh-ye Mazhan District in Khusf County, South Khorasan province, Iran.

== Demographics ==
=== Population ===
At the time of the 2006 National Census, the village's population was 463 in 122 households, when it was in the former Khusf District of Birjand County. The following census in 2011 counted 214 people in 62 households. The 2016 census measured the population of the village as 177 people in 54 households, by which time the district had been separated from the county in the establishment of Khusf County. The rural district was transferred to the new Jolgeh-ye Mazhan District.
