= Feyzabad, Khusf =

Village in South Khorasan province, Iran

Feyzabad Persian: فيض اباد
- Village
- Location within Iran
- Coordinates: 32°12′44″N 58°56′05″E
- Country: Iran
- Province: South Khorasan
- County: Khusf
- District: Jolgeh-ye Mazhan
- Rural District: Qaleh Zari

Population (2016)
  - Total: 166
- Time zone: UTC+3:30 (IRST)

Feyzabad (Persian: فيض اباد) (Note: Also romanized as Feyẕābād; also known as Faizābād, Feiz Abad Khoosaf and Feyzābād-e Sarchāh) is a village in Qaleh Zari Rural District of Jolgeh-ye Mazhan District in Khusf County, South Khorasan province, Iran.

== Demographics ==
=== Population ===
At the time of the 2006 National Census, the village's population was 171 in 59 households, when it was in the former Khusf District of Birjand County. The following census in 2011 counted 121 people in 40 households. The 2016 census measured the population of the village as 166 people in 56 households, by which time the district had been separated from the county in the establishment of Khusf County. The rural district was transferred to the new Jolgeh-ye Mazhan District.
