= Sarv Bad =

Village in South Khorasan province, Iran

Sarv Bad Persian: سروباد
- Village
- Location within Iran
- Coordinates: 32°56′37″N 58°25′49″E
- Country: Iran
- Province: South Khorasan
- County: Khusf
- District: Central
- Rural District: Khvor

Population (2016)
  - Total: 316
- Time zone: UTC+3:30 (IRST)

Sarv Bad (Persian: سروباد) (Note: Also romanized as Sarv Bād; also known as Sarvābād (سرواباد), Shūrābād, and Sīrūbād) is a village in Khvor Rural District of the Central District in Khusf County, South Khorasan province, Iran.

== Demographics ==
=== Population ===
At the time of the 2006 National Census, the village's population was 358 in 80 households, when it was in Khusf Rural District of the former Khusf District in Birjand County. The following census in 2011 counted 340 people in 88 households. The 2016 census measured the population of the village as 316 people in 94 households, by which time the district had been separated from the county in the establishment of Khusf County. The rural district was transferred to the new Central District, and Sarv Bad was transferred to Khvor Rural District created in the same district.
