= Asghariyeh =

Village in South Khorasan province, Iran

Asghariyeh Persian: اصغريه
- Village
- Location within Iran
- Coordinates: 32°33′00″N 59°07′22″E
- Country: Iran
- Province: South Khorasan
- County: Khusf
- District: Jolgeh-ye Mazhan
- Rural District: Jolgeh-ye Mazhan

Population (2016)
  - Total: 171
- Time zone: UTC+3:30 (IRST)

Asghariyeh (Persian: اصغريه) (Note: Also romanized as ‘Asgharīyeh) is a village in Jolgeh-ye Mazhan Rural District of Jolgeh-ye Mazhan District in Khusf County, South Khorasan province, Iran.

== Demographics ==
=== Population ===
At the time of the 2006 National Census, the village's population was 178 in 42 households, when it was in the former Khusf District of Birjand County. The following census in 2011 counted 204 people in 53 households. The 2016 census measured the population of the village as 171 people in 44 households, by which time the district had been separated from the county in the establishment of Khusf County. The rural district was transferred to the new Jolgeh-ye Mazhan District.
