= Pesteh =

Pesteh پسته
- Village
- Location within Iran
- Coordinates: 32°18′28″N 59°09′55″E
- Country: Iran
- Province: South Khorasan
- County: Khusf
- Bakhsh: Jolgeh-e Mazhan
- Rural District: Qaleh Zari

Population (2006)
  - Total: 10
- Time zone: UTC+3:30 (IRST)
  - Summer (DST): UTC+4:30 (IRDT)

Pesteh (Persian: پسته, also Romanized as Pisteh) is a village in Qaleh Zari Rural District, Jolgeh-e Mazhan District, Khusf County, South Khorasan Province, Iran. At the 2006 census, its population was 10, in 4 families.
