= Kuseh =

Kuseh (Persian: كوسه) may refer to:

- Kuseh, Golestan
- Kuseh, Sarpol-e Zahab, Kermanshah Province
- Kuseh, North Khorasan
- Kuseh, Bukan, West Azerbaijan Province
- Kuseh, Shahin Dezh, West Azerbaijan Province
- Kuseh, Yazd

== See also ==
- Kusheh (disambiguation)
