= Dahan Rud, Khusf =

Village in South Khorasan province, Iran

Dahan Rud Persian: دهن رود
- Village
- Location within Iran
- Coordinates: 33°01′09″N 58°38′43″E
- Country: Iran
- Province: South Khorasan
- County: Khusf
- District: Central
- Rural District: Khvor

Population (2016)
  - Total: 72
- Time zone: UTC+3:30 (IRST)

Dahan Rud (Persian: دهن رود) (Note: Also romanized as Dahan Rūd) is a village in Khvor Rural District of the Central District in Khusf County, South Khorasan province, Iran.

== Demographics ==
=== Population ===
At the time of the 2006 National Census, the village's population was 96 in 35 households, when it was in Khusf Rural District of the former Khusf District in Birjand County. The following census in 2011 counted 67 people in 27 households. The 2016 census measured the population of the village as 72 people in 25 households, by which time the district had been separated from the county in the establishment of Khusf County. The rural district was transferred to the new Central District, and Dahan Rud was transferred to Khvor Rural District created in the same district.
