= Joft Rud =

Village in South Khorasan province, Iran

Joft Rud Persian: جفت رود
- Village
- Location within Iran
- Coordinates: 32°51′55″N 58°35′53″E
- Country: Iran
- Province: South Khorasan
- County: Khusf
- District: Central
- Rural District: Khvor

Population (2016)
  - Total: 14
- Time zone: UTC+3:30 (IRST)

Joft Rud (Persian: جفت رود) (Note: Also romanized as Joft Rood and Joft Rūd; also known as Jofrūd and Jufrūd) is a village in Khvor Rural District of the Central District in Khusf County, South Khorasan province, Iran.

== Demographics ==
=== Population ===
At the time of the 2006 National Census, the village's population was 21 in seven households, when it was in Khusf Rural District of the former Khusf District in Birjand County. The following census in 2011 counted 18 people in seven households. The 2016 census measured the population of the village as 14 people in six households, by which time the district had been separated from the county in the establishment of Khusf County. The rural district was transferred to the new Central District, and Joft Rud was transferred to Khvor Rural District created in the same district.
