= Dowlatabad, Jolgeh-ye Mazhan =

Village in South Khorasan province, Iran

Dowlatabad Persian: دولت اباد
- Village
- Location within Iran
- Coordinates: 32°31′40″N 59°07′47″E
- Country: Iran
- Province: South Khorasan
- County: Khusf
- District: Jolgeh-ye Mazhan
- Rural District: Jolgeh-ye Mazhan

Population (2016)
  - Total: 268
- Time zone: UTC+3:30 (IRST)

Dowlatabad (Persian: دولت اباد) (Note: Also romanized as Dowlatābād; also known as Daulatābād and Dowlat Abad Mo”men Abad) is a village in Jolgeh-ye Mazhan Rural District of Jolgeh-ye Mazhan District in Khusf County, South Khorasan province, Iran.

== Demographics ==
=== Population ===
At the time of the 2006 National Census, the village's population was 578 in 124 households, when it was in the former Khusf District of Birjand County. The following census in 2011 counted 166 people in 45 households. The 2016 census measured the population of the village as 268 people in 82 households, by which time the district had been separated from the county in the establishment of Khusf County. The rural district was transferred to the new Jolgeh-ye Mazhan District.
