= Shah Zileh =

Village in South Khorasan province, Iran

Shah Zileh Persian: شاه زيله
- Village
- Location within Iran
- Coordinates: 32°48′18″N 58°53′09″E
- Country: Iran
- Province: South Khorasan
- County: Khusf
- District: Central
- Rural District: Khusf

Population (2016)
  - Total: 475
- Time zone: UTC+3:30 (IRST)

Shah Zileh (Persian: شاه زيله) (Note: Also romanized as Shāh Zīleh and Shāhzilleh; also known as Kalāt-e Maleḵ (كلات ملك) and Mehdīyeh (مهديه)) is a village in Khusf Rural District of the Central District in Khusf County, South Khorasan province, Iran.

== Demographics ==
=== Population ===
At the time of the 2006 National Census, the village's population was 465 in 144 households, when it was in the former Khusf District of Birjand County. The following census in 2011 counted 387 people in 133 households. The 2016 census measured the population of the village as 475 people in 163 households, by which time the district had been separated from the county in the establishment of Khusf County. The rural district was transferred to the new Central District.
