= Aliabad-e Zarein =

Village in South Khorasan province, Iran

Aliabad-e Zarein Persian: علی‌آباد زارعین
- Village
- Location within Iran
- Coordinates: 32°12′32″N 58°55′07″E
- Country: Iran
- Province: South Khorasan
- County: Khusf
- District: Jolgeh-ye Mazhan
- Rural District: Qaleh Zari

Population (2016)
  - Total: 225
- Time zone: UTC+3:30 (IRST)

Aliabad-e Zarein (Persian: علی‌آباد زارعین) (Note: Also romanized as ‘Alīābād-e Zāre‘īn; also known as ‘Alīābād) is a village in, and the capital of, Qaleh Zari Rural District in Jolgeh-ye Mazhan District of Khusf County, South Khorasan province, Iran.

== Demographics ==
=== Population ===
At the time of the 2006 National Census, the village's population was 260 in 73 households, when it was in the former Khusf District of Birjand County. The following census in 2011 counted 207 people in 59 households. The 2016 census measured the population of the village as 225 people in 76 households, by which time the district had been separated from the county in the establishment of Khusf County. The rural district was transferred to the new Jolgeh-ye Mazhan District.
