= Taqab, South Khorasan =

Village in South Khorasan province, Iran

Taqab Persian: تقاب
- Village
- Location within Iran
- Coordinates: 32°50′21″N 58°55′49″E
- Country: Iran
- Province: South Khorasan
- County: Khusf
- District: Central
- Rural District: Khusf

Population (2016)
  - Total: 967
- Time zone: UTC+3:30 (IRST)

Taqab (Persian: تقاب) (Note: Also romanized as Taqāb; also known as Moḩammadābād and Tāghāb) is a village in Khusf Rural District of the Central District in Khusf County, South Khorasan province, Iran.

== Demographics ==
=== Population ===
At the time of the 2006 National Census, the village's population was 920 in 256 households, when it was in the former Khusf District of Birjand County. The following census in 2011 counted 1,086 people in 336 households. The 2016 census measured the population of the village as 967 people in 299 households, by which time the district had been separated from the county in the establishment of Khusf County. The rural district was transferred to the new Central District. Taqab was the most populous village in its rural district.
