= Masumabad, Khusf =

Village in South Khorasan province, Iran

Masumabad Persian: معصوم اباد
- Village
- Location within Iran
- Coordinates: 32°49′56″N 58°55′27″E
- Country: Iran
- Province: South Khorasan
- County: Khusf
- District: Central
- Rural District: Khusf

Population (2016)
  - Total: 914
- Time zone: UTC+3:30 (IRST)

Masumabad (Persian: معصوم اباد) (Note: Also romanized as Ma‘soom Abad and Ma‘şūmābād) is a village in Khusf Rural District of the Central District in Khusf County, South Khorasan province, Iran.

== Demographics ==
=== Population ===
At the time of the 2006 National Census, the village's population was 774 in 199 households, when it was in the former Khusf District of Birjand County. The following census in 2011 counted 773 people in 242 households. The 2016 census measured the population of the village as 914 people in 288 households, by which time the district had been separated from the county in the establishment of Khusf County. The rural district was transferred to the new Central District.
