= Tuj =

Tuj (Persian: توج) or TUJ may refer to:

- Tuj, Hormozgan
- Tuj, South Khorasan
- Tuj, alternate name of Tajag, South Khorasan
- Tum Airport (IATA airport code TUJ, ICAO airport code HAMJ), Maji Woreda, Ethiopia

== See also ==
- Temple University, Japan Campus (TUJ)
