= Golund-e Olya =

Golund-e Olya گلوندعليا
- Village
- Location within Iran
- Coordinates: 32°34′28″N 59°02′08″E
- Country: Iran
- Province: South Khorasan
- County: Khusf
- Bakhsh: Jolgeh-e Mazhan
- Rural District: Jolgeh-e Mazhan

Population (2006)
  - Total: 21
- Time zone: UTC+3:30 (IRST)
  - Summer (DST): UTC+4:30 (IRDT)

Golund-e Olya (Persian: گلوندعليا, also Romanized as Golūnd-e ‘Olyā; also known as Golūnd, Kolūnd, Gulūnd, and Golownd) is a village in Jolgeh-e Mazhan Rural District, Jolgeh-e Mazhan District, Khusf County, South Khorasan Province, Iran. At the 2006 census, its population was 21, in 11 families.
