= Shadan =

Village in South Khorasan province, Iran

Shadan Persian: شادان
- Village
- Location within Iran
- Coordinates: 32°21′30″N 59°01′29″E
- Country: Iran
- Province: South Khorasan
- County: Khusf
- District: Jolgeh-ye Mazhan
- Rural District: Qaleh Zari

Population (2016)
  - Total: 94
- Time zone: UTC+3:30 (IRST)

Shadan (Persian: شادان) (Note: Also romanized as Shādān) is a village in Qaleh Zari Rural District of Jolgeh-ye Mazhan District in Khusf County, South Khorasan province, Iran.

== Demographics ==
=== Population ===
At the time of the 2006 National Census, the village's population was 87 in 21 households, when it was in the former Khusf District of Birjand County. The following census in 2011 counted 51 people in 15 households. The 2016 census measured the population of the village as 94 people in 34 households, by which time the district had been separated from the county in the establishment of Khusf County. The rural district was transferred to the new Jolgeh-ye Mazhan District.
