= Feriz, Khusf =

Village in South Khorasan province, Iran

Feriz Persian: فريز
- Village
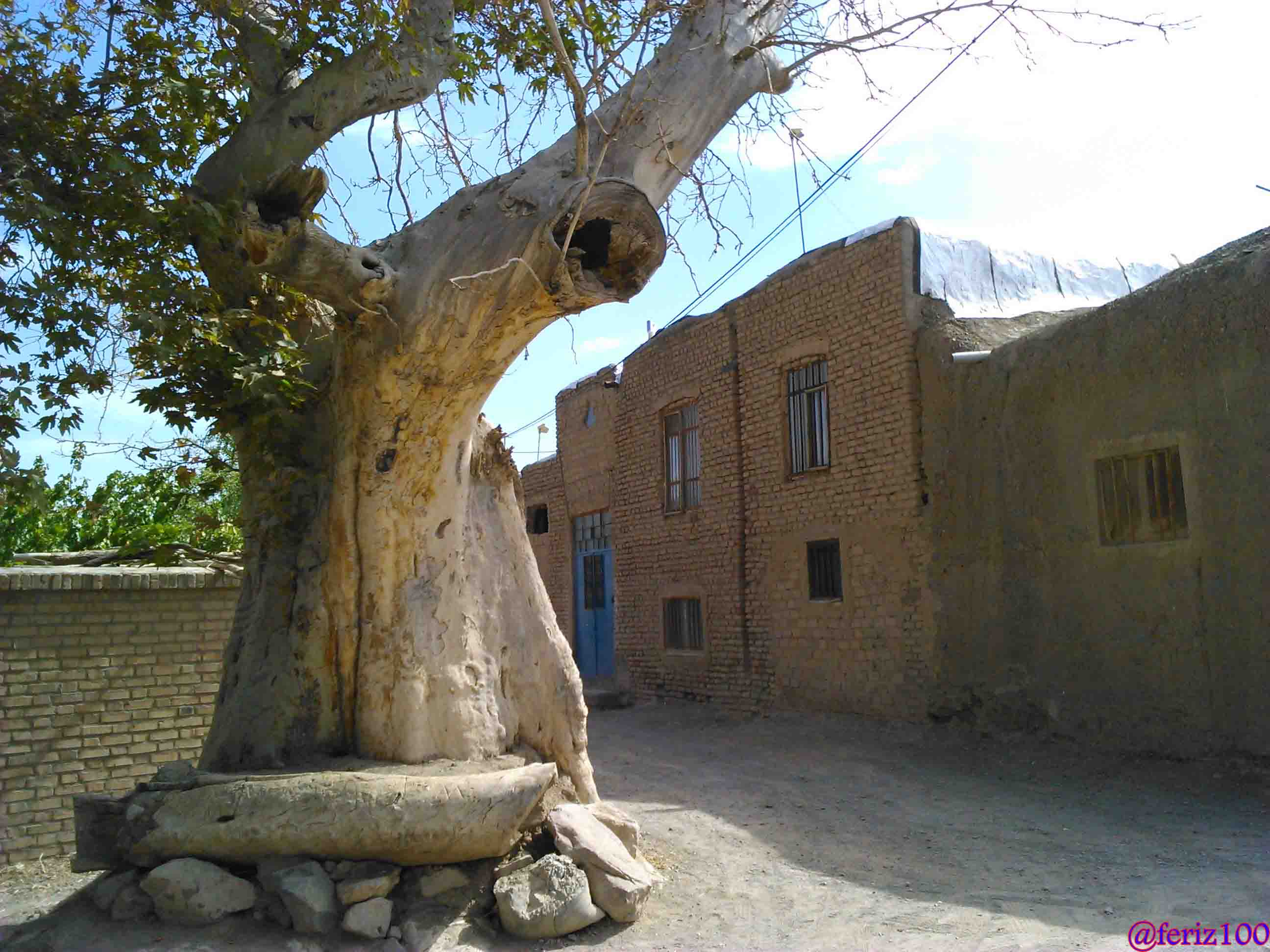
- Tree in the village of Fariz

- Location within Iran
- Coordinates: 32°42′24″N 59°08′56″E
- Country: Iran
- Province: South Khorasan
- County: Khusf
- District: Jolgeh-ye Mazhan
- Rural District: Barakuh

Population (2016)
  - Total: 164
- Time zone: UTC+3:30 (IRST)

Feriz (Persian: فريز) (Note: Also romanized as Farīz and Ferīz; also known as Fariz Khoosaf, Ferīs, and Firīz) is a village in Barakuh Rural District of Jolgeh-ye Mazhan District in Khusf County, South Khorasan province, Iran.

== Demographics ==
=== Population ===
At the time of the 2006 National Census, the village's population was 216 in 81 households, when it was in the former Khusf District of Birjand County. The following census in 2011 counted 101 people in 47 households. The 2016 census measured the population of the village as 164 people in 74 households, by which time the district had been separated from the county in the establishment of Khusf County. The rural district was transferred to the new Jolgeh-ye Mazhan District.
