= Zanuk =

Zanuk زنوك
- Village
- Location within Iran
- Coordinates: 32°45′24″N 59°09′40″E
- Country: Iran
- Province: South Khorasan
- County: Khusf
- Bakhsh: Jolgeh-e Mazhan
- Rural District: Barakuh

Population (2006)
  - Total: 75
- Time zone: UTC+3:30 (IRST)
  - Summer (DST): UTC+4:30 (IRDT)

Zanuk (Persian: زنوك, also Romanized as Zanūk, Zenyūk, Zanoog, Zenūk, Zeynūk, and Zinūk) is a village in Barakuh Rural District, Jolgeh-e Mazhan District, Khusf County, South Khorasan Province, Iran. At the 2006 census, its population was 75, in 25 families.
