= Basiran, South Khorasan =

Village in South Khorasan province, Iran

Basiran Persian: بصيران
- Village
- Location within Iran
- Coordinates: 31°57′33″N 59°06′59″E
- Country: Iran
- Province: South Khorasan
- County: Khusf
- District: Jolgeh-ye Mazhan
- Rural District: Qaleh Zari

Population (2016)
  - Total: 215
- Time zone: UTC+3:30 (IRST)

Basiran (Persian: بصيران) (Note: Also romanized as Başīrān) is a village in Qaleh Zari Rural District of Jolgeh-ye Mazhan District in Khusf County, South Khorasan province, Iran.

== Demographics ==
=== Population ===
At the time of the 2006 National Census, the village's population was 213 in 55 households, when it was in the former Khusf District of Birjand County. The following census in 2011 counted 273 people in 85 households. The 2016 census measured the population of the village as 215 people in 69 households, by which time the district had been separated from the county in the establishment of Khusf County. The rural district was transferred to the new Jolgeh-ye Mazhan District.
