= Barmazid-e Sofla =

Village in South Khorasan, Iran

Barmazid-e Sofla برمزيدسفلي
- Village
- Location within Iran
- Coordinates: 32°22′44″N 59°05′36″E
- Country: Iran
- Province: South Khorasan
- County: Khusf
- Bakhsh: Jolgeh-e Mazhan
- Rural District: Qaleh Zari

Population (2006)
  - Total: 28
- Time zone: UTC+3:30 (IRST)
  - Summer (DST): UTC+4:30 (IRDT)

Barmazid-e Sofla (Persian: برمزيدسفلي, also Romanized as Barmazīd-e Soflá and Barmazīd Soflá; also known as Barmazīd-e Pā’īn, Mazīd, and Zīd) is a village in Qaleh Zari Rural District, Jolgeh-e Mazhan District, Khusf County, South Khorasan Province, Iran. At the 2006 census, its population was 28, in 10 families.
