= Kusheh-ye Qeysabad =

Village in South Khorasan province, Iran

Kusheh-ye Qeysabad Persian: کوشه قيس آباد
- Village
- Location within Iran
- Country: Iran
- Province: South Khorasan
- County: Khusf
- District: Jolgeh-ye Mazhan
- Rural District: Jolgeh-ye Mazhan

Population (2016)
  - Total: 196
- Time zone: UTC+3:30 (IRST)

Kusheh-ye Qeysabad (Persian: کوشه قيس آباد) (Note: Also romanized as Kūsheh-ye Qeyşābād; formerly known as Kusheh (کوشه), also romanized as Kūsheh) is a village in Jolgeh-ye Mazhan Rural District of Jolgeh-ye Mazhan District in Khusf County, South Khorasan province, Iran.

== Demographics ==
=== Population ===
At the time of the 2006 National Census, the village's population, as Kusheh, was 170 in 51 households, when it was in the former Khusf District of Birjand County. The following census in 2011 counted 154 people in 47 households. The 2016 census measured the population of the village as 196 people in 72 households, by which time the district had been separated from the county in the establishment of Khusf County. The rural district was transferred to the new Jolgeh-ye Mazhan District and the village was listed as Kusheh-ye Qeysabad.
