= Nowdar, South Khorasan =

Nowdar نودر
- Village
- Location within Iran
- Coordinates: 32°45′12″N 59°07′28″E
- Country: Iran
- Province: South Khorasan
- County: Khusf
- Bakhsh: Jolgeh-e Mazhan
- Rural District: Barakuh

Population (2006)
  - Total: 33
- Time zone: UTC+3:30 (IRST)
  - Summer (DST): UTC+4:30 (IRDT)

Nowdar (Persian: نودر; also known as Nowdan) is a village in Barakuh Rural District, Jolgeh-e Mazhan District, Khusf County, South Khorasan Province, Iran. At the 2006 census, its population was 33, in 14 families.
