= Beynabad =

Beynabad or Binabad or Bein Abad (Persian: بين اباد) may refer to:

- Beynabad, South Khorasan
- Beynabad, Yazd
