= Eylaki =

Eylaki or Ailaki or Ilaki or Eylaqi (Persian: عيلكي) may refer to:

- Eylaki-ye Bala
- Eylaki-ye Pain
