= Mehinj, Khusf =

Mehinj مهنج
- Village
- Location within Iran
- Coordinates: 32°26′41″N 59°04′27″E
- Country: Iran
- Province: South Khorasan
- County: Khusf
- Bakhsh: Jolgeh-e Mazhan
- Rural District: Jolgeh-e Mazhan

Population (2006)
  - Total: 34
- Time zone: UTC+3:30 (IRST)
  - Summer (DST): UTC+4:30 (IRDT)

Mehinj (Persian: مهنج, also Romanized as Mehīnj, Mehanj, Mehnaj, Mehnej, and Mihinj) is a village in Jolgeh-e Mazhan Rural District, Jolgeh-e Mazhan District, Khusf County, South Khorasan Province, Iran. At the 2006 census, its population was 34, in 8 families.
