= Giv =

Giv or GIV may refer to:

== Places ==
- Giv, Markazi, Iran
- Giv, South Khorasan, Iran

== Other uses ==
- Giv (Shahnameh), a character in the Persian epic Shahnameh
- CCDC88A, a protein
- The Governor's Institutes of Vermont
- Gulfstream IV, a private twinjet aircraft
- Rostam Giv (1880–1980), Iranian politician and philanthropist

== See also ==
- G4 (disambiguation)
- Give (disambiguation)
