= Taqiabad, Qaleh Zari =

Taqiabad تقی‌آباد
- Village
- Location within Iran
- Coordinates: 32°21′49″N 59°03′02″E
- Country: Iran
- Province: South Khorasan
- County: Khusf
- Bakhsh: Jolgeh-e Mazhan
- Rural District: Qaleh Zari

Population (2006)
  - Total: 77
- Time zone: UTC+3:30 (IRST)
  - Summer (DST): UTC+4:30 (IRDT)

Taqiabad (Persian: تقی‌آباد, also Romanized as Taqīābād and Taghīābād; also known as Taqīābād-e Shādān) is a village in Qaleh Zari Rural District, Jolgeh-e Mazhan District, Khusf County, South Khorasan Province, Iran. At the 2006 census, its population was 77, in 21 families.
