= Zadonbeh =

Zadonbeh (Persian: زادنبه) may refer to:

- Zadonbeh-ye Bala
- Zadonbeh-ye Pain
