= Mehinj =

Mehinj or Mehanj or Mehnaj or Mehnej or Mihinj or Mehenj (Persian: مهنج) may refer to:

- Mehinj, Khusf
- Mehenj, Qaen
