= Tajag =

Tajag تجگ
- Village
- Location within Iran
- Coordinates: 32°55′45″N 58°45′50″E
- Country: Iran
- Province: South Khorasan
- County: Khusf
- Bakhsh: Central District
- Rural District: Khusf

Population (2006)
  - Total: 113
- Time zone: UTC+3:30 (IRST)
  - Summer (DST): UTC+4:30 (IRDT)

Tajag (Persian: تجگ, also Romanized as Tajak; also known as Tījak, Tijg, and Tūj) is a village in Khusf Rural District, Central District, Khusf County, South Khorasan Province, Iran. At the 2006 census, its population was 113, in 34 families.
