= Sarvabad (disambiguation) =

Sarvabad is a city in Kurdistan Province, Iran.

Sarvabad (Persian: سروآباد) may also refer to:

- Sarvabad, Razavi Khorasan
- Sarvabad, South Khorasan
- Sarvabad County, in Kurdistan Province
