= Hengaran =

Hengaran (Persian: هنگران) may refer to:

- Hengaran, Kerman
- Hengaran, South Khorasan
