= Razag Khoosaf =

Razag Khoosaf may refer to:

- Razg, Khusf
- Rehizg
