= Jolgeh-e Mazhan =

Jolgeh-e Mazhan (Persian: جلگه ماژان) may refer to:

- Jolgeh-e Mazhan District
- Jolgeh-e Mazhan Rural District
