= Sivjan =

Village in South Khorasan province, Iran

Sivjan Persian: سيوجان
- Village
- Location within Iran
- Coordinates: 32°52′05″N 58°57′57″E
- Country: Iran
- Province: South Khorasan
- County: Khusf
- District: Central
- Rural District: Khusf

Population (2016)
  - Total: 803
- Time zone: UTC+3:30 (IRST)

Sivjan (Persian: سيوجان) (Note: Also romanized as Seyowjān, Sīūjān, Sivajan, Sīvjān, and Sīyūjān; also known as Dabestān-e Seyyowjān, Sīojān, and Sīrjān) is a village in Khusf Rural District of the Central District in Khusf County, South Khorasan province, Iran.

== Demographics ==
=== Population ===
At the time of the 2006 National Census, the village's population was 787 in 239 households, when it was in the former Khusf District of Birjand County. The following census in 2011 counted 822 people in 286 households. The 2016 census measured the population of the village as 803 people in 263 households, by which time the district had been separated from the county in the establishment of Khusf County. The rural district was transferred to the new Central District.
