= Zadonbeh-ye Bala =

Zadonbeh-ye Bala زادنبه بالا
- Village
- Location within Iran
- Coordinates: 32°44′48″N 59°07′58″E
- Country: Iran
- Province: South Khorasan
- County: Khusf
- Bakhsh: Jolgeh-e Mazhan
- Rural District: Barakuh

Population (2006)
  - Total: 30
- Time zone: UTC+3:30 (IRST)
  - Summer (DST): UTC+4:30 (IRDT)

Zadonbeh-ye Bala (Persian: زادنبه بالا, also Romanized as Zādonbeh-ye Bālā) is a village in Barakuh Rural District, Jolgeh-e Mazhan District, Khusf County, South Khorasan Province, Iran. At the 2006 census, its population was 30, in 14 families.
