= Khorram, South Khorasan =

Village in South Khorasan province, Iran

Khorram Persian: خرم
- Village
- Location within Iran
- Coordinates: 32°59′20″N 58°34′22″E
- Country: Iran
- Province: South Khorasan
- County: Khusf
- District: Central
- Rural District: Khvor

Population (2016)
  - Total: 107
- Time zone: UTC+3:30 (IRST)

Khorram (Persian: خرم) (Note: Also romanized as Kharam) is a village in Khvor Rural District of the Central District in Khusf County, South Khorasan province, Iran.

== Demographics ==
=== Population ===
At the time of the 2006 National Census, the village's population was 57 in 14 households, when it was in Khusf Rural District of the former Khusf District in Birjand County. The following census in 2011 counted 98 people in 31 households. The 2016 census measured the population of the village as 107 people in 36 households, by which time the district had been separated from the county in the establishment of Khusf County. The rural district was transferred to the new Central District, and Khorram was transferred to Khvor Rural District created in the same district.
