= Dam Rubah =

Dam Rubah or Dom-e Rubah (Persian: دم روباه) may refer to:

- Dom-e Rubah, Razavi Khorasan
- Dam Rubah, South Khorasan
