= Kaftar Milan =

Kaftar Milan كفترميلان
- Village
- Location within Iran
- Coordinates: 32°16′18″N 59°10′06″E
- Country: Iran
- Province: South Khorasan
- County: Khusf
- Bakhsh: Jolgeh-e Mazhan
- Rural District: Qaleh Zari

Population (2006)
  - Total: 76
- Time zone: UTC+3:30 (IRST)
  - Summer (DST): UTC+4:30 (IRDT)

Kaftar Milan (Persian: كفترميلان, also Romanized as Kaftar Mīlān; also known as Kaftar) is a village in Qaleh Zari Rural District, Jolgeh-e Mazhan District, Khusf County, South Khorasan Province, Iran. At the 2006 census, its population was 76, in 22 families.
