= Holudar-e Pain =

Holudar-e Pain هلودرپايين
- Village
- Location within Iran
- Coordinates: 32°44′13″N 59°13′32″E
- Country: Iran
- Province: South Khorasan
- County: Khusf
- Bakhsh: Jolgeh-e Mazhan
- Rural District: Barakuh

Population (2006)
  - Total: 36
- Time zone: UTC+3:30 (IRST)
  - Summer (DST): UTC+4:30 (IRDT)

Holudar-e Pain (Persian: هلودرپايين, also Romanized as Holūdar-e Pā’īn, Ḩalūdar-e Pā’īn, and Haludar Pā’īn; also known as Ḩalūdar) is a village in Barakuh Rural District, Jolgeh-e Mazhan District, Khusf County, South Khorasan Province, Iran. At the 2006 census, its population was 36, in 12 families.
