= Zarkesh =

Zarkesh or Zar Gesh or Zarkish (Persian: زركش) may refer to:

- Zarkesh, Razavi Khorasan
- Zarkesh, South Khorasan
- Zarkesh, Tehran Province
