= Seyyedan, Khusf =

Village in South Khorasan province, Iran

Seyyedan Persian: سيدان
- Village
- Location within Iran
- Coordinates: 32°21′01″N 58°49′37″E
- Country: Iran
- Province: South Khorasan
- County: Khusf
- District: Jolgeh-ye Mazhan
- Rural District: Qaleh Zari

Population (2016)
  - Total: 131
- Time zone: UTC+3:30 (IRST)

Seyyedan (Persian: سيدان) (Note: Also romanized as Seyyedān and Sīdān; also known as Seydū, Seydūn, and Sīdu) is a village in Qaleh Zari Rural District of Jolgeh-ye Mazhan District in Khusf County, South Khorasan province, Iran.

== Demographics ==
=== Population ===
At the time of the 2006 National Census, the village's population was 133 in 37 households, when it was in the former Khusf District of Birjand County. The following census in 2011 counted 118 people in 36 households. The 2016 census measured the population of the village as 131 people in 42 households, by which time the district had been separated from the county in the establishment of Khusf County. The rural district was transferred to the new Jolgeh-ye Mazhan District.
