= Tuj, South Khorasan =

Tuj توج
- Village
- Location within Iran
- Coordinates: 32°25′37″N 59°10′09″E
- Country: Iran
- Province: South Khorasan
- County: Khusf
- Bakhsh: Jolgeh-e Mazhan
- Rural District: Jolgeh-e Mazhan

Population (2006)
  - Total: 16
- Time zone: UTC+3:30 (IRST)
  - Summer (DST): UTC+4:30 (IRDT)

Tuj (Persian: توج, also Romanized as Tūj and Tooj; also known as Tūch) is a village in Jolgeh-e Mazhan Rural District, Jolgeh-e Mazhan District, Khusf County, South Khorasan Province, Iran. At the 2006 census, its population was 16, in 5 families.
