= Giv, South Khorasan =

Village in South Khorasan province, Iran

Giv Persian: گيو
- Village
- Location within Iran
- Coordinates: 32°33′35″N 59°14′53″E
- Country: Iran
- Province: South Khorasan
- County: Khusf
- District: Jolgeh-ye Mazhan
- Rural District: Jolgeh-ye Mazhan

Population (2016)
  - Total: 251
- Time zone: UTC+3:30 (IRST)

Giv (Persian: گيو) (Note: Also romanized as Gīv) is a village in Jolgeh-ye Mazhan Rural District of Jolgeh-ye Mazhan District in Khusf County, South Khorasan province, Iran.

== Demographics ==
=== Population ===
At the time of the 2006 National Census, the village's population was 319 in 107 households, when it was in the former Khusf District of Birjand County. The following census in 2011 counted 310 people in 102 households. The 2016 census measured the population of the village as 251 people in 88 households, by which time the district had been separated from the county in the establishment of Khusf County. The rural district was transferred to the new Jolgeh-ye Mazhan District.
