= Beynabad, South Khorasan =

Beynabad بيناباد
- Village
- Location within Iran
- Coordinates: 33°01′21″N 58°42′49″E
- Country: Iran
- Province: South Khorasan
- County: Khusf
- Bakhsh: Central District
- Rural District: Khusf

Population (2006)
  - Total: 165
- Time zone: UTC+3:30 (IRST)
  - Summer (DST): UTC+4:30 (IRDT)

Beynabad (Persian: بيناباد, also Romanized as Beynābād and Bīnābād) is a village in Khusf Rural District, Central District, Khusf County, South Khorasan Province, Iran. At the 2006 census, its population was 165, in 62 families.
