= Yushu, Iran =

Yushu يوشو
- Village
- Location within Iran
- Coordinates: 32°28′07″N 59°06′26″E
- Country: Iran
- Province: South Khorasan
- County: Khusf
- Bakhsh: Jolgeh-e Mazhan
- Rural District: Jolgeh-e Mazhan

Population (2006)
  - Total: 13
- Time zone: UTC+3:30 (IRST)
  - Summer (DST): UTC+4:30 (IRDT)

Yushu (Persian: يوشو, also Romanized as Yūshū and Yooshoo; also known as Yūshūr) is a village in Jolgeh-e Mazhan Rural District, Jolgeh-e Mazhan District, Khusf County, South Khorasan Province, Iran. At the 2006 census, its population was 13, in 5 families.
