= Zadonbeh-ye Pain =

Zadonbeh-ye Pain زادنبه پائين
- Village
- Location within Iran
- Coordinates: 32°44′30″N 59°07′48″E
- Country: Iran
- Province: South Khorasan
- County: Khusf
- Bakhsh: Jolgeh-e Mazhan
- Rural District: Barakuh

Population (2006)
  - Total: 9
- Time zone: UTC+3:30 (IRST)
  - Summer (DST): UTC+4:30 (IRDT)

Zadonbeh-ye Pain (Persian: زادنبه پائين, also Romanized as Zādonbeh-ye Pā’īn; also known as Zādan Beg Pāīn and Zādonbeh) is a village in Barakuh Rural District, Jolgeh-e Mazhan District, Khusf County, South Khorasan Province, Iran. At the 2006 census, its population was 9, in 4 families.
