= Eylaki-ye Bala =

Eylaki-ye Bala عيلكي بالا
- Village
- Location within Iran
- Coordinates: 32°43′35″N 59°13′28″E
- Country: Iran
- Province: South Khorasan
- County: Khusf
- Bakhsh: Jolgeh-e Mazhan
- Rural District: Barakuh

Population (2006)
  - Total: 84
- Time zone: UTC+3:30 (IRST)
  - Summer (DST): UTC+4:30 (IRDT)

Eylaki-ye Bala (Persian: عيلكي بالا, also Romanized as ‘Eylakī-ye Bālā, ‘Eylaqī Bālā, and ‘Īlakī Bālā; also known as Ailaki and ‘Eylakī) is a village in Barakuh Rural District, Jolgeh-e Mazhan District, Khusf County, South Khorasan Province, Iran. At the 2006 census, its population was 84, in 22 families.
