= Eylaki-ye Pain =

Eylaki-ye Pain عيلكي پائين
- Village
- Location within Iran
- Coordinates: 32°42′38″N 59°13′48″E
- Country: Iran
- Province: South Khorasan
- County: Khusf
- Bakhsh: Jolgeh-e Mazhan
- Rural District: Barakuh

Population (2006)
  - Total: 412
- Time zone: UTC+3:30 (IRST)
  - Summer (DST): UTC+4:30 (IRDT)

Eylaki-ye Pain (Persian: عيلكي پائين, also Romanized as ‘Eylakī-ye Pā’īn and Eylakī Pā’īn; also known as Eylaki) is a village in Barakuh Rural District, Jolgeh-e Mazhan District, Khusf County, South Khorasan Province, Iran. At the 2006 census, its population was 412, in 114 families.
