= Hoseynabad-e Sheybani, South Khorasan =

Hoseynabad-e Sheybani حسين ابادشيباني
- Village
- Location within Iran
- Coordinates: 32°32′30″N 59°02′57″E
- Country: Iran
- Province: South Khorasan
- County: Khusf
- Bakhsh: Jolgeh-e Mazhan
- Rural District: Jolgheh-e Mazhan

Population (2006)
  - Total: 50
- Time zone: UTC+3:30 (IRST)
  - Summer (DST): UTC+4:30 (IRDT)

Hoseynabad-e Sheybani (Persian: حسين ابادشيباني, also Romanized as Ḩoseynābād-e Sheybānī; also known as Kalāteh-ye Ḩamīdeh Khānom) is a village in Jolgeh-e Mazhan Rural District, Jolgeh-e Mazhan District, Khusf County, South Khorasan Province, Iran. At the 2006 census, its population was 50, in 15 families.
