= Hoseynabad-e Sheybani =

Hoseynabad-e Sheybani (Persian: حسين ابادشيباني) may refer to:

- Hoseynabad Sheybani-ye Kavir, Isfahan Province
- Hoseynabad-e Sheybani, South Khorasan
