= Zeyd, South Khorasan =

Zeyd زيد
- Village
- Location within Iran
- Coordinates: 32°21′41″N 59°05′28″E
- Country: Iran
- Province: South Khorasan
- County: Khusf
- Bakhsh: Jolgeh-e Mazhan
- Rural District: Qaleh Zari

Population (2006)
  - Total: 29
- Time zone: UTC+3:30 (IRST)
  - Summer (DST): UTC+4:30 (IRDT)

Zeyd (Persian: زيد, also Romanized as Zeyd) is a village in Qaleh Zari Rural District, Jolgeh-e Mazhan District, Khusf County, South Khorasan Province, Iran. At the 2006 census, its population was 29, in 9 families.
