= Nowdar =

Nowdar or Now Dar or Nuder (Persian: نودر) may refer to:

- Now Dar, Khuzestan
- Nowdar, South Khorasan
