= Haludar =

Haludar may refer to:

- Haludar, a Bengali painter whose works were used as illustrations in Francis Hamilton's An Account of the Fishes Found in the River Ganges and Its Branches (1822), and about whom little else is known
- Holudar-e Pain, a village in Barakuh Rural District, Iran.
