= Kalateh-ye Bagh, South Khorasan =

Kalateh-ye Bagh (Persian: باغ كلاته) may refer to:

- Bagh, South Khorasan
- Tuti, South Khorasan
