= Dahan Rud =

Dahan Rud (Persian: دهن رود) may refer to:

- Dahan Rud, Khusf
- Dahan Rud, Nehbandan
