= Nuder =

Nuder may refer to:

- Pär Nuder, Swedish politician
- Nuder, Iran (disambiguation), places in Iran
