= Kaftar =

Kaftar is the Persian language word for hyena. It may refer to:

- Kaftar Milan, a place in Iran
- Bibi Ayesha, Afghan warlord who was nicknamed Kaftar
