= Sirjan (disambiguation) =

Sirjan is a city in Kerman Province, Iran.

Sirjan (Persian: سيرجان) may refer to:

- Sirjan County, in Kerman Province
- Sirjan, Birjand, South Khorasan
- Serijan, South Khorasan

== See also ==
- Srijan, a college fest by the Indian Institute of Technology (Indian School of Mines), Dhanbad, Jharkhand, India
- Srijan Pal Singh, Indian writer
- Srijan Bhattacharya, Indian political activist
- Srijan Mahajan, Indian musician
