= Majan =

Majan may refer to:

- Maján, municipality in Soria province, Spain
- Magan (civilization) (مجان majān), ancient culture in present-date Oman and United Arab Emirates
- Mazhan, Iran (ماژان), village in South Khorasan province, Iran; sometimes romanised mājān
- Japanese mahjong (麻雀 mājan), tile-based game

== See also ==
- Mazhan (disambiguation)
- Majano (disambiguation)
