= Gusheh-ye Olya, South Khorasan =

Gusheh-ye Olya گوشه عليا
- Village
- Location within Iran
- Coordinates: 32°49′23″N 58°55′12″E
- Country: Iran
- Province: South Khorasan
- County: Khusf
- Bakhsh: Central District
- Rural District: Khusf

Population (2006)
  - Total: 193
- Time zone: UTC+3:30 (IRST)
  - Summer (DST): UTC+4:30 (IRDT)

Gusheh-ye Olya (Persian: گوشه عليا, also Romanized as Gusheh-ye ‘Olyā and Goosheh Olya; also known as Kūsheh-ye Bālā, Gūsheh-ye Bālā, Kusheh Aulia, Kūsheh Bālā, Kūsheh ‘Olyā, and Kusheh-ye ‘Olyā) is a village in Khusf Rural District, Central District, Khusf County, South Khorasan Province, Iran. At the 2006 census, its population was 193, in 53 families.
