= Kharam =

Kharam or Kherem (Persian: خرم) may refer to:

- Kharam (tribe), in India
- Kherem, Mazandaran
- Kharam, Khusf, South Khorasan Province

== See also ==
- Khorram (disambiguation)
