= Tuyeh =

Tuyeh or Tooyeh (Persian: تويه) may refer to:

- Tuyeh, Amirabad
- Tuyeh, Damghan
