= Mazhan =

Mazhan may refer to these places:

- Mazhan, Shandong, in Yishui County, Shandong, China
- Mazhan, Zhejiang, in Cangnan County, Zhejiang, China
- Mazhan Township, Tengchong, Yunnan, China
- Mazhan, Iran, a village in Jolgeh-e Mazhan District, Khusf County, South Khorasan, Iran

== See also ==
- Majan (disambiguation)
