= Jufrud =

Jufrud (Persian: جوفرود) may refer to:

- Jufrud, Gilan
- Jufrud, South Khorasan
