= Sidu =

Sidu may refer to:

== People ==
- Dhanurjaya Sidu, Indian politician
- Majed Abu-Sidu (born 1985), Palestinian football player

== Places ==
- Seyyedan, Khusf, or Sīdu, Iran
- Sidu, Guidong County, a town in Guidong County, Hunan Province, China
- Sidu River, crossed by the Sidu River Bridge, Badong County, Hubei Province, China

== Other ==
- Sidu (TV series), a 2016–2022 Sri Lankan drama series
- SIDU (Indonesian Brand), an Indonesian brand since 1984 that produces office appliances.
