= Khorram =

Khorram (Persian: خرم) may refer to:

== People with the surname ==
- Adib Khorram (born 1984), Iranian-American author
- Ahmad Khorram (born 1950), Iranian politician
- Homayoun Khorram (born 1930), Iranian musician

== Places ==
- Khorram Brickworks, Qazvin Province, Iran
- Khorram, Isfahan, Iran
- Khorram, Kerman, Iran
- Khorram, Razavi Khorasan, Iran
- Kharam, Birjand, South Khorasan Province, Iran

== See also ==
- Kharam (disambiguation)
