= Yush, South Khorasan =

Yush يوش
- Village
- Location within Iran
- Coordinates: 32°26′52″N 59°07′01″E
- Country: Iran
- Province: South Khorasan
- County: Khusf
- Bakhsh: Jolgeh-e Mazhan
- Rural District: Jolgeh-e Mazhan

Population (2006)
  - Total: 44
- Time zone: UTC+3:30 (IRST)
  - Summer (DST): UTC+4:30 (IRDT)

Yush (Persian: يوش, also Romanized as Yūsh and Yoosh; also known as Yūshu) is a village in Jolgeh-e Mazhan Rural District, Jolgeh-e Mazhan District, Khusf County, South Khorasan Province, Iran. At the 2006 census, its population was 44, in 12 families.
