= Khvor Castle =

Castle in South Khorasan Province, Iran

Khvor castle
- قلعه خور
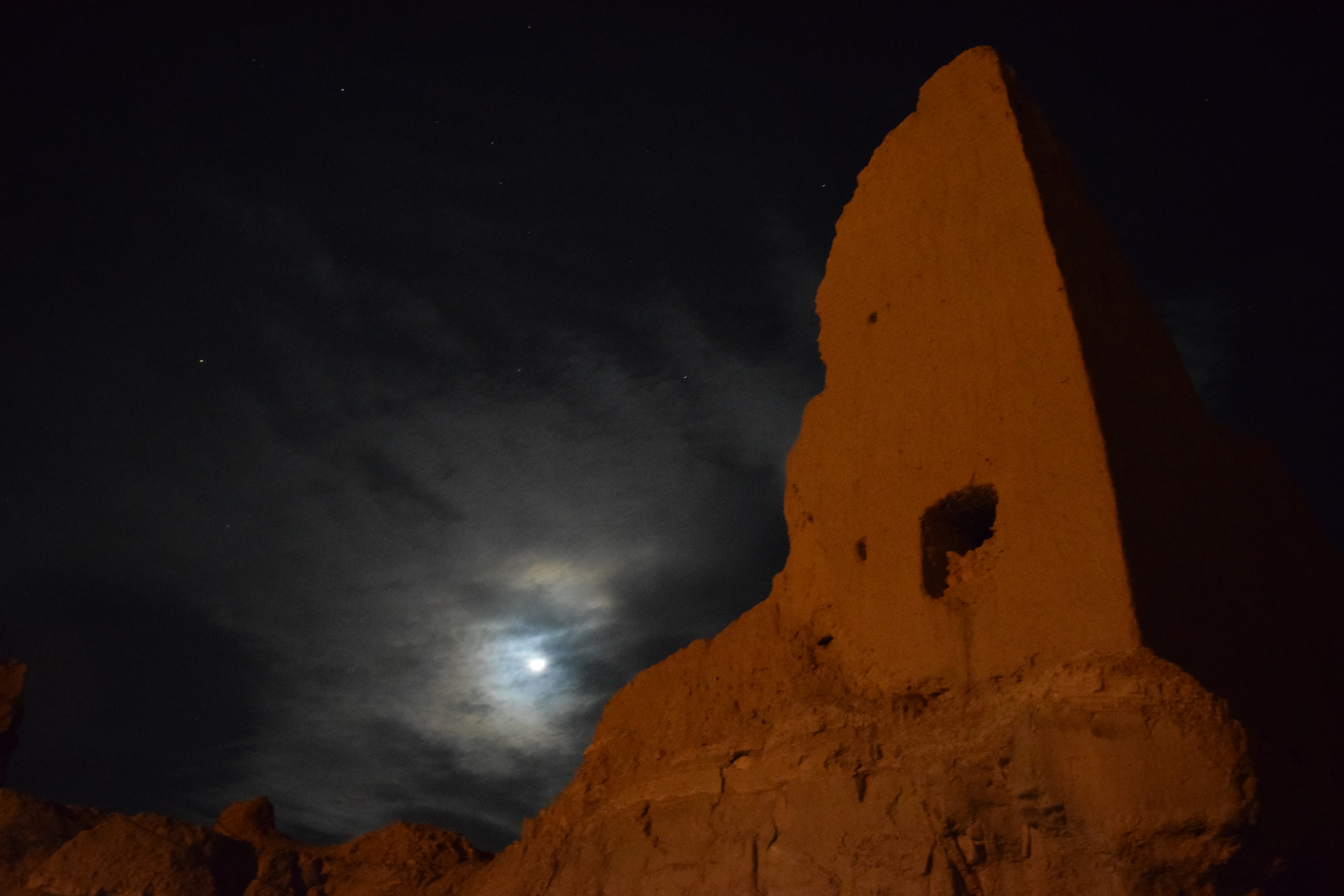
- Interactive map of the Khvor castle area

General information
- Type: Castle
- Location: Khusf County, Iran

Khvor castle (Persian: قلعه خور) is a historical castle located in Khusf County in South Khorasan Province, The longevity of this fortress dates back to the Safavid dynasty.
