= Sartangeh =

Sartangeh (Persian: سرتنگه) may refer to:

- Sartangeh, Mazandaran
- Sartangeh, Semnan
