= Gusheh-ye Sofla, South Khorasan =

Village in South Khorasan province, Iran

Gusheh-ye Sofla Persian: گوشه سفلي
- Village
- Location within Iran
- Country: Iran
- Province: South Khorasan
- County: Khusf
- District: Central
- Rural District: Khusf

Population (2016)
  - Total: 232
- Time zone: UTC+3:30 (IRST)

Gusheh-ye Sofla (Persian: گوشه سفلي) (Note: Also romanized as Goosheh Sofla and Gūsheh-ye Soflá; also known as Gūsheh-ye Pā’īn, Kusheh Sofla (كوشه سفلي), Kūsheh-ye Pā’īn, and Kūsheh-ye Soflá) is a village in Khusf Rural District of the Central District in Khusf County, South Khorasan province, Iran.

== Demographics ==
=== Population ===
At the time of the 2006 National Census, the village's population was 88 in 31 households, when it was in the former Khusf District of Birjand County. The following census in 2011 counted 103 people in 35 households. The 2016 census measured the population of the village as 232 people in 74 households, by which time the district had been separated from the county in the establishment of Khusf County. The rural district was transferred to the new Central District.
