= Khvor Rural District =

Rural district in South Khorasan province, Iran

Khvor Rural District Persian: دهستان خور
- Rural District
- Location within Iran
- Coordinates: 33°00′N 58°22′E
- Country: Iran
- Province: South Khorasan
- County: Khusf
- District: Central
- Established: 2011
- Capital: Khvor

Population (2016)
  - Total: 2,476
- Time zone: UTC+3:30 (IRST)

Khvor Rural District (Persian: دهستان خور) is in the Central District of Khusf County, South Khorasan province, Iran. Its capital is the village of Khvor.

== History ==
In 2011, Khusf District was separated from Birjand County in the establishment of Khusf County, and Khvor Rural District was created in the new Central District.

== Demographics ==
=== Population ===
At the time of the 2016 National Census, the rural district's population was 2,476 in 643 households. The most populous of its 28 villages was Khvor, with 1,010 people in 175 households.

=== Other villages in the rural district ===
- Dahan Rud
- Deym
- Hami
- Hamun
- Joft Rud
- Khorram
- Nughab
- Salak
- Sarv Bad
- Tuti
- Zarkesh
