= Mohammadshahr, South Khorasan =

City in South Khorasan province, Iran

Mohammadshahr Persian: محمدشهر
- City
- Location within Iran
- Coordinates: 32°52′33″N 59°01′06″E
- Country: Iran
- Province: South Khorasan
- County: Khusf
- District: Central
- Established as a city: 2007

Population (2016)
  - Total: 3,590
- Time zone: UTC+3:30 (IRST)

Mohammadshahr (Persian: محمدشهر) (Note: Also romanized as Moḩammadshahr; formerly the village of Moḩammadīyeh) is a city in the Central District of Khusf County, South Khorasan province, Iran.

== Demographics ==
=== Population ===
At the time of the 2006 National Census, the population was 117 in 29 households, when it was the village of Mohammadiyeh in Khusf Rural District of the former Khusf District in Birjand County. The following census in 2011 counted 1,707 people in 43 households, by which time the village had been converted to a city and renamed Mohammadshahr. The 2016 census measured the population of the city as 3,590 people in 46 households, when the district had been separated from the county in the establishment of Khusf County. Mohammadshahr and the rural district were transferred to the new Central District.
