= Gusheh-ye Sofla =

Gusheh-ye Sofla (Persian: گوشه سفلي) or Gusheh-ye Pain (Persian: گوشه پائين), both meaning "Lower Gusheh", may refer to:

- Gusheh-ye Sofla, Kohgiluyeh and Boyer-Ahmad
- Gusheh-ye Sofla, Markazi
- Gusheh-ye Sofla, South Khorasan
