= Gusheh-ye Olya =

Gusheh-ye Olya (Persian: گوشه عليا) or Gusheh-ye Bala (Persian: گوشه بالا), both meaning "Upper Gusheh", may refer to:

- Gusheh-ye Olya, Kohgiluyeh and Boyer-Ahmad
- Gusheh-ye Olya, Markazi
- Gusheh-ye Olya, South Khorasan

== See also ==
- Kusheh-ye Olya (disambiguation)
