= 玉树 =

玉树 (Chinese: 玉樹; pinyin: Yùshù) may refer to:

== Places in Qinghai Province, China ==
- Yushu Tibetan Autonomous Prefecture (玉树藏族自治州/玉樹藏族自治州/ཡུལ་ཤུལ་་བོད་རིགས་རང་སྐྱོང་ཁུལ།), prefecture
- Yushu County (玉树县/玉樹縣/ཡུས་ཧྲུའུ་), county in Yushu Prefecture

== Given name ==
- Henry Kao (高玉樹; 1913–2005), Taiwanese politician
- Chan Yuk-shee (陳玉樹) (1954–2017), President of Lingnan University of Hong Kong

== See also ==
- Yushu (disambiguation)
