= Dasht-e Bu =

Village in Semnan province, Iran

Dasht-e Bu Persian: دشتبو
- Village
- Location within Iran
- Coordinates: 36°01′36″N 53°49′21″E
- Country: Iran
- Province: Semnan
- County: Damghan
- District: Amirabad
- Rural District: Tuyehdarvar

Population (2016)
  - Total: 131
- Time zone: UTC+3:30 (IRST)

Dasht-e Bu (Persian: دشتبو) (Note: Also romanized as Dasht Bū, Dasht-e Bū, and Dashtboo; also known as Dashtadi and Dashtgū) is a village in Tuyehdarvar Rural District of Amirabad District in Damghan County, Semnan province, Iran.

== Demographics ==
=== Population ===
At the time of the 2006 National Census, the village's population was 76 in 30 households. The following census in 2011 counted 61 people in 36 households. The 2016 census measured the population of the village as 131 people in 51 households.
