= Mazhan, Iran =

Village in South Khorasan province, Iran

Mazhan Persian: ماژان
- Village
- Location within Iran
- Coordinates: 32°34′53″N 59°00′53″E
- Country: Iran
- Province: South Khorasan
- County: Khusf
- District: Jolgeh-ye Mazhan
- Rural District: Jolgeh-ye Mazhan

Population (2016)
  - Total: 476
- Time zone: UTC+3:30 (IRST)

Mazhan (Persian: ماژان) (Note: Also romanized as Māzhān; also known as Mājān) is a village in Jolgeh-ye Mazhan Rural District of Jolgeh-ye Mazhan District in Khusf County, South Khorasan province, Iran, serving as capital of both the district and the rural district.

== Demographics ==
=== Population ===
At the time of the 2006 National Census, the village's population was 420 in 125 households, when it was in the former Khusf District of Birjand County. The following census in 2011 counted 532 people in 149 households. The 2016 census measured the population of the village as 476 people in 151 households, by which time the district had been separated from the county in the establishment of Khusf County. The rural district was transferred to the new Jolgeh-ye Mazhan District. It was the most populous village in its rural district.
