= Majano (disambiguation) =

Majano is a town in Friuli. It could also refer to:

- Valverde del Majano, a municipality located in the province of Segovia, Castile and León, Spain
- Majano (genus), a sea anemone genus
- Adolfo Arnoldo Majano (b. 1938), Salvadoran army officer and member of the provisional junta (1979–1980).
- Anton Giulio Majano (1909–1994), an Italian screenwriter and film director
- Maiano, locale in Fiesole, of which it is a variant spelling
- Benedetto da Maiano (1442–1497), an Italian sculptor
- Dante da Maiano, a late thirteenth-century poet

== See also ==
- Majan (disambiguation)
