= G4 =

G4 or G.IV may refer to:

== Places ==
- County Route G4 (California), a county highway in Santa Clara County, California, USA
- G4 Beijing–Hong Kong and Macau Expressway, an expressway in China
- G4 (Taichung Metro), also known as Songzhu Station or Jiushe Station, a station under construction in the Taichung Metro

== Arts, entertainment, games, media ==
- G4 (American TV network), a former American television channel
- G4 (Canadian TV channel), a former Canadian television channel
- G4 (group), a British vocal troupe
- Grob's attack, an opening move in chess

== Groups, organisations, companies ==
- G4 nations, four nations that support each other's bids to become permanent members of the United Nations Security Council: Brazil, Germany, India, and Japan
- Big Four (Western Europe), sometimes called 'G4', a group of powerful countries in Europe
- VIP Protection Unit (Hong Kong), a unit of the Hong Kong Police Force (originally Section G, Division 4)
- Allegiant Air, by IATA airline designator
- G4 Racing, a Swiss auto racing team

== Electrics, electronics, and computing ==
- G4, a type of bi-pin lamp base (socket), a lamp fitting where the pin spacing is 4mm
- LG G4 smartphone
- Moto G4, a line of smartphones
- Group 4 compression, a type of image compression used in fax machines and some image file formats

=== Apple Computer ===
- PowerPC G4, a type of microprocessor by Freescale used by Apple
  - Power Mac G4, a series of personal computers made by Apple Inc in July 1999
  - PowerBook G4, a series of Professional notebooks made by Apple Inc in 2001
  - iMac G4, a series of personal computer made by Apple Inc in January 2002
  - Xserve G4, an Xserve server made by Apple Inc in May 2002
  - iBook G4, an iBook series of consumer notebooks in October 2003
  - Mac Mini G4, a Mac Mini series of ultracompact computer in January 2005

=== Science and medicine ===
- G-4 (drug) (Ganesha-4), a psychedelic-related chemical compound

== Vehicles ==
- AEG G.IV, a German World War I heavy bomber
- Caudron G.4, a 1915 French biplane
- Friedrichshafen G.IV, a 1918 German medium bomber
- Gotha G.IV, a 1916 German heavy bomber
- Gulfstream IV, a family of private jet aircraft
- Mahindra Alturas G4, an Indian mid-size SUV
- Mitsubishi G4M "Betty", a World War II Japanese fast bomber
- Mitsubishi Mirage G4, a Japanese subcompact sedan
- Soko G-4 Super Galeb, a jet trainer/light attack jet of Yugoslav origin
- USS G4 (SS-26), a 1914 G-class submarine of the United States Navy
- G4-class freighter, a cargo ship design
- LNER Class G4, a class of British steam locomotives
- Pontiac G4, a compact car sold in Mexico

== Other uses ==
- G4 EA H1N1, a strain of influenza
- G-quadruplex, a DNA secondary structure
- Group 4 element, a class of elements on the Periodic Table
- ATC code G04 Urologicals, a subgroup of the Anatomical Therapeutic Chemical Classification System
- Galactic 04 (G04), a Virgin Galactic suborbital tourist spaceflight in October 2023, the first spaceflight of a Pakistani

== See also ==
- Group 4 (disambiguation)
  - G4S, formerly Group 4 Securicor
- 4G (disambiguation)
- Gang of Four (disambiguation)
- Kamen Rider Agito: Project G4, the Kamen Rider Agito film
  - Kamen Rider G4, the movie exclusive character
- Giv (disambiguation)
