= Deh Khoda, Semnan =

Village in Semnan province, Iran

Deh Khoda Persian: دهخدا
- Village
- Location within Iran
- Coordinates: 36°01′50″N 53°49′31″E
- Country: Iran
- Province: Semnan
- County: Damghan
- District: Amirabad
- Rural District: Tuyehdarvar

Population (2016)
  - Total: 260
- Time zone: UTC+3:30 (IRST)

Deh Khoda (Persian: دهخدا) (Note: Also romanized as Deh Khodā) is a village in Tuyehdarvar Rural District of Amirabad District in Damghan County, Semnan province, Iran.

== Demographics ==
=== Population ===
At the time of the 2006 National Census, the village's population was 55 in 24 households. The following census in 2011 counted 294 people in 111 households. The 2016 census measured the population of the village as 260 people in 105 households.
