= Sah, Iran =

Village in Semnan province, Iran

Sah Persian: صح
- Village
- Location within Iran
- Coordinates: 35°59′36″N 53°55′39″E
- Country: Iran
- Province: Semnan
- County: Damghan
- District: Amirabad
- Rural District: Tuyehdarvar

Population (2016)
  - Total: 243
- Time zone: UTC+3:30 (IRST)

Sah (Persian: صح) (Note: Also romanized as Şaḩ and Şah; also known as Sār) is a village in Tuyehdarvar Rural District of Amirabad District in Damghan County, Semnan province, Iran.

== Demographics ==
=== Population ===
At the time of the 2006 National Census, the village's population was 238 in 81 households. The following census in 2011 counted 288 people in 111 households. The 2016 census measured the population of the village as 243 people in 88 households.
