= Ziddi =

Ziddi (lit. 'Stubborn') may refer to:

- Ziddi (1948 film), an Indian Hindi-language film
- Ziddi (1964 film), an Indian Hindi-language film by Pramod Chakravorty
- Ziddi (1973 film), a Pakistani Punjabi-language film
- Ziddi (1997 film), an Indian Hindi-language action film starring Sunny Deol and Raveena Tandon
- Ziddi (2006 film), an Indian Odia-language film starring Sidhant Mohapatra
- Ziddi (2013 film), an Indian Kannada-language action film
- Ziddi, Tajikistan, a town and jamoat in Tajikistan

== See also ==
- Zid (disambiguation)
