= Yush =

Yush, Yoosh or Yoush (Persian: يوش) may refer to:

- Yush, Mazandaran
- Yush, South Khorasan
- Kristal Yush (born 1982), American female hammer thrower
- Yush, a 1994 novel by Jamaican born British author Victor Headley
