= Darvar, Semnan =

Village in Semnan province, Iran

Darvar Persian: دروار
- Village
- Location within Iran
- Coordinates: 36°00′03″N 53°54′36″E
- Country: Iran
- Province: Semnan
- County: Damghan
- District: Amirabad
- Rural District: Tuyehdarvar

Population (2016)
  - Total: 478
- Time zone: UTC+3:30 (IRST)

Darvar (Persian: دروار) (Note: Also romanized as Darvār and Darwar; also known as Darbār and Gazvār) is a village in, and the capital of, Tuyehdarvar Rural District in Amirabad District of Damghan County, Semnan province, Iran.

== Demographics ==
=== Population ===
At the time of the 2006 National Census, the village's population was 709 in 223 households. The following census in 2011 counted 597 people in 200 households. The 2016 census measured the population of the village as 478 people in 162 households, the most populous in its rural district.
