= 4G (disambiguation) =

4G is a generation of standards for mobile telecommunication.

4G may also refer to:

- 4G or 4GL, a fourth-generation programming language
- 4G (film), an upcoming Indian film
- 4G, the production code for the 1975 Doctor Who serial Pyramids of Mars
- 4G, a type of artificial turf

== See also ==
- G4 (disambiguation)
