= Tuyehdarvar Rural District =

Rural district in Semnan province, Iran

Tuyehdarvar Rural District Persian: دهستان تويه دروار
- Rural District
- Location within Iran
- Coordinates: 35°53′N 53°59′E
- Country: Iran
- Province: Semnan
- County: Damghan
- District: Amirabad
- Established: 1993
- Capital: Darvar

Population (2016)
  - Total: 1,637
- Time zone: UTC+3:30 (IRST)

Tuyehdarvar Rural District (Persian: دهستان تويه دروار) is in Amirabad District of Damghan County, Semnan province, Iran. Its capital is the village of Darvar.

== Demographics ==
=== Population ===
At the time of the 2006 National Census, the rural district's population was 1,563 in 542 households. There were 1,920 inhabitants in 716 households at the following census of 2011. The 2016 census measured the population of the rural district as 1,637 in 610 households. The most populous of its 83 villages was Darvar, with 478 people.

=== Other villages in the rural district ===
- Dasht-e Bu
- Deh Khoda
- Qusheh
- Sah
- Sartangeh
- Tuyeh
