= Zeyd =

Zeyd may refer to:

- Zeyid, Azerbaijan
- Zeyd, Ilam, Iran
- Bala Zeyd, Mazandaran Province, Iran
- Pain Zeyd, Mazandaran Province, Iran
- Zeyd, South Khorasan, Iran

== See also ==
- Zaid (disambiguation)
