= Beynabad, Yazd =

Beynabad بين اباد
- Village
- Location within Iran
- Coordinates: 31°19′10″N 54°03′31″E
- Country: Iran
- Province: Yazd
- County: Taft
- Bakhsh: Nir
- Rural District: Garizat

Population (2006)
  - Total: 37
- Time zone: UTC+3:30 (IRST)
  - Summer (DST): UTC+4:30 (IRDT)

Beynabad (Persian: بين اباد, also Romanized as Beynābād and Bein Abad) is a village in Garizat Rural District, Nir District, Taft County, Yazd Province, Iran. At the 2006 census, its population was 37, in 13 families.
