= Tuj, Hormozgan =

Village in Hormozgan, Iran

Tuj توج
- Village
- Location within Iran
- Coordinates: 27°20′57″N 56°41′00″E
- Country: Iran
- Province: Hormozgan
- County: Bandar Abbas
- Bakhsh: Qaleh Qazi
- Rural District: Qaleh Qazi

Population (2006)
  - Total: 125
- Time zone: UTC+3:30 (IRST)
  - Summer (DST): UTC+4:30 (IRDT)

Tuj (Persian: توج, also Romanized as Tūj) is a village in Qaleh Qazi Rural District, Qaleh Qazi District, Bandar Abbas County, Hormozgan Province, Iran. At the 2006 census, its population was 125, in 26 families.
