= Kuseh, Shahin Dezh =

Kuseh كوسه
- Village
- Location within Iran
- Coordinates: 36°48′02″N 46°40′39″E
- Country: Iran
- Province: West Azerbaijan
- County: Shahin Dezh
- Bakhsh: Keshavarz
- Rural District: Chaharduli

Population (2006)
  - Total: 116
- Time zone: UTC+3:30 (IRST)
  - Summer (DST): UTC+4:30 (IRDT)

Kuseh (Persian: كوسه, also Romanized as Kūseh) is a village in Chaharduli Rural District, Keshavarz District, Shahin Dezh County, West Azerbaijan Province, Iran. At the 2006 census, its population was 116, in 29 families.
