= Rehizg =

Rehizg رهيزگ
- Village
- Location within Iran
- Coordinates: 32°23′41″N 59°18′28″E
- Country: Iran
- Province: South Khorasan
- County: Sarbisheh
- Bakhsh: Mud
- Rural District: Naharjan

Population (2006)
  - Total: 16
- Time zone: UTC+3:30 (IRST)
  - Summer (DST): UTC+4:30 (IRDT)

Rehizg (Persian: رهيزگ, also Romanized as Rehīzg, Rahezg, Rahīzag, and Rahīzak; also known as Rahzang and Razag Khoosaf) is a village in Naharjan Rural District, Mud District, Sarbisheh County, South Khorasan Province, Iran. At the 2006 census, its population was 16, in 7 families.
