= Gusheh, Dorud =

Gusheh گوشه
- Village
- Location within Iran
- Coordinates: 33°53′00″N 48°45′00″E
- Country: Iran
- Province: Lorestan
- County: Dorud
- Bakhsh: Silakhor
- Rural District: Silakhor

Population (2006)
  - Total: 536
- Time zone: UTC+3:30 (IRST)
  - Summer (DST): UTC+4:30 (IRDT)

Gusheh (Persian: گوشه, also Romanized as Gūsheh; also known as Gūsheh Chehār Chinār and Gūsheh-ye Chahār Chenār) is a village in Silakhor Rural District, Silakhor District, Dorud County, Lorestan Province, Iran. At the 2006 census, its population was 536, in 144 families.
