= Dom-e Rubah, Razavi Khorasan =

Dom-e Rubah دم روباه
- Village
- Location within Iran
- Coordinates: 35°54′25″N 59°58′49″E
- Country: Iran
- Province: Razavi Khorasan
- County: Mashhad
- Bakhsh: Razaviyeh
- Rural District: Abravan

Population (2006)
  - Total: 293
- Time zone: UTC+3:30 (IRST)
  - Summer (DST): UTC+4:30 (IRDT)

Dom-e Rubah (Persian: دم روباه, also Romanized as Dom-e Rūbāh) is a village in Abravan Rural District, Razaviyeh District, Mashhad County, Razavi Khorasan Province, Iran. At the 2006 census, its population was 293, in 60 families.
