= Taqiabad, Rafsanjan =

Taqiabad تقی‌آباد
- Village
- Location within Iran
- Coordinates: 30°37′19″N 55°34′59″E
- Country: Iran
- Province: Kerman
- County: Rafsanjan
- Bakhsh: Koshkuiyeh
- Rural District: Sharifabad

Population (2006)
  - Total: 1,103
- Time zone: UTC+3:30 (IRST)
  - Summer (DST): UTC+4:30 (IRDT)

Taqiabad (Persian: تقی‌آباد, also Romanized as Taqīābād) is a village in Sharifabad Rural District, Koshkuiyeh District, Rafsanjan County, Kerman Province, Iran. At the 2006 census, its population was 1,103, in 272 families.
