= Gusheh-ye Sofla, Kohgiluyeh and Boyer-Ahmad =

Gusheh-ye Sofla گوشه سفلي
- Village
- Location within Iran
- Coordinates: 30°55′57″N 50°44′51″E
- Country: Iran
- Province: Kohgiluyeh and Boyer-Ahmad
- County: Charam
- Bakhsh: Sarfaryab
- Rural District: Poshteh-ye Zilayi

Population (2006)
  - Total: 118
- Time zone: UTC+3:30 (IRST)
  - Summer (DST): UTC+4:30 (IRDT)

Gusheh-ye Sofla (Persian: گوشه سفلي, also Romanized as Gūsheh-ye Soflá and Gūsheh-e Soflá; also known as Gūsheh) is a village in Poshteh-ye Zilayi Rural District, Sarfaryab District, Charam County, Kohgiluyeh and Boyer-Ahmad Province, Iran. At the 2006 census, its population was 118, in 21 families.
