= Gusheh-ye Olya, Kohgiluyeh and Boyer-Ahmad =

Gusheh-ye Olya گوشه عليا
- Village
- Location within Iran
- Coordinates: 30°55′57″N 50°45′06″E
- Country: Iran
- Province: Kohgiluyeh and Boyer-Ahmad
- County: Charam
- Bakhsh: Sarfaryab
- Rural District: Poshteh-ye Zilayi

Population (2006)
  - Total: 113
- Time zone: UTC+3:30 (IRST)
  - Summer (DST): UTC+4:30 (IRDT)

Gusheh-ye Olya (Persian: گوشه عليا, also Romanized as Gūsheh-ye ‘Olyā; also known as Gūsheh and Gūsheh-ye Bālā) is a village in Poshteh-ye Zilayi Rural District, Sarfaryab District, Charam County, Kohgiluyeh and Boyer-Ahmad Province, Iran. At the 2006 census, its population was 113, in 19 families.
