= Zarkesh, Tehran province =

Coordinates: 35.7167°N 51.4778°E

Zarkesh is a province in Tehran, Iran located in District 8. It is a suburb in north-east of Tehran, the country's capital city. It historically has consisted of primarily Armenian population, who are Christians. Its coordinates are 35°43'0"N 51°28'40"E.
