= Gusheh, Kiar =

Gusheh گوشه
- Village
- Location within Iran
- Coordinates: 31°52′00″N 50°46′47″E
- Country: Iran
- Province: Chaharmahal and Bakhtiari
- County: Kiar
- Bakhsh: Naghan
- Rural District: Naghan

Population (2006)
  - Total: 173
- Time zone: UTC+3:30 (IRST)
  - Summer (DST): UTC+4:30 (IRDT)

Gusheh (Persian: گوشه, also Romanized as Gūsheh) is a village in Naghan Rural District, Naghan District, Kiar County, Chaharmahal and Bakhtiari Province, Iran. At the 2006 census, its population was 173, in 34 families. The village is populated by Lurs.
