= Taqiabad, Khuzestan =

Taqiabad تقی‌آباد
- Village
- Location within Iran
- Coordinates: 32°07′25″N 49°04′47″E
- Country: Iran
- Province: Khuzestan
- County: Masjed Soleyman
- Bakhsh: Central
- Rural District: Jahangiri

Population (2006)
  - Total: 98
- Time zone: UTC+3:30 (IRST)
  - Summer (DST): UTC+4:30 (IRDT)

Taqiabad (Persian: تقی‌آباد, also Romanized as Taqīābād and Taghi Abad) is a village in Jahangiri Rural District, in the Central District of Masjed Soleyman County, Khuzestan Province, Iran. At the 2006 census, its population was 98, in 18 families.
