= Mehenj, Qaen =

Mehenj مهنج
- Village
- Location within Iran
- Coordinates: 33°46′28″N 58°59′55″E
- Country: Iran
- Province: South Khorasan
- County: Qaen
- Bakhsh: Central
- Rural District: Qaen

Population (2006)
  - Total: 439
- Time zone: UTC+3:30 (IRST)
  - Summer (DST): UTC+4:30 (IRDT)

Mehenj (Persian: مهنج; also known as Manhaj, Meharj, Mīnīj, and Mininj) is a village in Qaen Rural District, in the Central District of Qaen County, South Khorasan Province, Iran. At the 2006 census, its population was 439, in 105 families.
