= Now Dar, Khuzestan =

Now Dar نودر
- Village
- Location within Iran
- Coordinates: 32°52′27″N 49°01′26″E
- Country: Iran
- Province: Khuzestan
- County: Dezful
- Bakhsh: Sardasht
- Rural District: Darreh Kayad

Population (2006)
  - Total: 37
- Time zone: UTC+3:30 (IRST)
  - Summer (DST): UTC+4:30 (IRDT)

Now Dar (Persian: نودر, also Romanized as Nūder) is a village in Darreh Kayad Rural District, Sardasht District, Dezful County, Khuzestan Province, Iran. At the 2006 census, its population was 37, in 7 families.
