= The Governor's Institutes of Vermont =

The Governor's Institutes of Vermont (GIV), a 501(c)(3) nonprofit organization based in Winooski, Vermont, was established in 1982 under then-Governor Richard Snelling when Vermont’s Commissioner of Education and the Director of the Vermont Arts Council sought to provide greater depth in arts education to students in the state’s public schools. Founded in the Governor's School model, GIV has since expanded to provides accelerated learning residencies in many more topics on college campuses for Vermont teenagers.

Since GIV was founded, the organization has worked with over 10,000 youth, partnered with 13 Vermont colleges and holds eleven residential summer institutes and two residential winter weekends. GIV actively seeks a wide range of applicants, even those who may not have extremely high GPAs or may be unsure of their goals, but who are willing to expand their horizons academically and creatively.

GIV offers summer institutes in architecture/building/design, the arts, writing, astronomy, current affairs, engineering, entrepreneurship, environmental science and technology, technology/design/coding, mathematical sciences, health/medicine, and youth activism, and winter institutes on a changing variety of topics such as neuroscience, journalism, songwriting and epidemiology. Institute topics are developed in collaboration with students, colleges, and the state's education and workforce development leaders.

GIV prioritizes equity to students from all demographic and economic backgrounds via widespread and targeted outreach throughout Vermont and a sliding scale tuition structure. A retrospective study of student outcomes entitled "GIV@30: A Long-term Look At How The Governor's Institutes of Vermont Is Changing Lives" was published by the group in 2014. Three decades of alumni surveyed identified what they perceived as the most effective factors in the success of the enrichment programming they received, which was briefly described in a booklet called "This Is What Transformational Education Looks Like".

GIV was recognized in 2019 by the New England Board of Higher Education. Former Executive Jean Olson was awarded the 2010 Walter Cerf Medal for Outstanding Achievement in the Arts for her contribution through GIV.

Alumna and Grammy-nominated musician Grace Potter talks about attending the Governor's Institute on the Arts, which is available online.

== Partner organizations ==
- State of Vermont Agency of Education
- Vermont Student Assistance Corporation
- National Conference of Governor's Schools
- Northeast Kingdom Astronomy Foundation
- Vermont State Mathematics Coalition
- Vermont Area Health Education Center
- Vermont Space Grant Consortium
