= Shahanshah, Lorestan =

Shahanshah شهنشاه
- Village
- Location within Iran
- Coordinates: 33°23′50″N 48°16′54″E
- Country: Iran
- Province: Lorestan
- County: Khorramabad
- Bakhsh: Central
- Rural District: Koregah-e Gharbi

Population (2006)
  - Total: 449
- Time zone: UTC+3:30 (IRST)
  - Summer (DST): UTC+4:30 (IRDT)

Shahanshah (Persian: شهنشاه, also Romanized as Shahanshāh, Shāhinshāh, and Shahshanāh; also known as Qaryeh-ye Shahanshāh and Gūsheh) is a village in Koregah-e Gharbi Rural District, in the Central District of Khorramabad County, Lorestan Province, Iran. At the 2006 census, its population was 449, in 88 families.
