= Taqiabad, Kurdistan =

Taqiabad تقی‌آباد
- Village
- Location within Iran
- Coordinates: 35°08′57″N 47°33′52″E
- Country: Iran
- Province: Kurdistan
- County: Qorveh
- Bakhsh: Central
- Rural District: Panjeh Ali

Population (2006)
  - Total: 161
- Time zone: UTC+3:30 (IRST)
  - Summer (DST): UTC+4:30 (IRDT)

Taqiabad (Persian: تقی‌آباد, also Romanized as Taqīābād; Sorani Kurdish: تەقیاوا) is a village in Panjeh Ali Rural District, in the Central District of Qorveh County, Kurdistan Province, Iran. At the 2006 census, its population was 161, in 37 families. The village is populated by Kurds.
