= Sarvabad, Razavi Khorasan =

Sarvabad سرواباد
- Village
- Location within Iran
- Coordinates: 36°30′57″N 59°23′12″E
- Country: Iran
- Province: Razavi Khorasan
- County: Mashhad
- Bakhsh: Central
- Rural District: Miyan Velayat

Population (2006)
  - Total: 392
- Time zone: UTC+3:30 (IRST)
  - Summer (DST): UTC+4:30 (IRDT)

Sarvabad (Persian: سرواباد, also Romanized as Sarvābād) is a village in Miyan Velayat Rural District, in the Central District of Mashhad County, Razavi Khorasan Province, Iran. At the 2006 census, its population was 392, in 92 families.
