= Tuyeh, Amirabad =

Village in Semnan province, Iran

Tuyeh Persian: تويه
- Village
- Location within Iran
- Coordinates: 36°01′37″N 53°51′26″E
- Country: Iran
- Province: Semnan
- County: Damghan
- District: Amirabad
- Rural District: Tuyehdarvar

Population (2016)
  - Total: 271
- Time zone: UTC+3:30 (IRST)

Tuyeh (Persian: تويه) (Note: Also romanized as Tūyeh; also known as Tū-ye Darbār) is a village in Tuyehdarvar Rural District of Amirabad District in Damghan County, Semnan province, Iran.

== Demographics ==
=== Population ===
At the time of the 2006 National Census, the village's population was 339 in 137 households. The following census in 2011 counted 454 people in 175 households. The 2016 census measured the population of the village as 271 people in 115 households.
