= Tudak-e Taqiabad =

Tudak-e Taqiabad تودک تقی‌آباد
- Village
- Location within Iran
- Coordinates: 28°27′08″N 60°50′02″E
- Country: Iran
- Province: Sistan and Baluchestan
- County: Khash
- Bakhsh: Nukabad
- Rural District: Taftan-e Jonubi

Population (2006)
  - Total: 82
- Time zone: UTC+3:30 (IRST)
  - Summer (DST): UTC+4:30 (IRDT)

Tudak-e Taqiabad (Persian: تودک تقی‌آباد, also Romanized as Tūdak-e Taqīābād; also known as Taqīābād, Toodak, and Tūdak) is a village in Taftan-e Jonubi Rural District, Nukabad District, Khash County, Sistan and Baluchestan Province, Iran. At the 2006 census, its population was 82, in 15 families.
