= Sartangeh, Semnan =

Village in Semnan province, Iran

Sartangeh Persian: سرتنگه
- Village
- Location within Iran
- Coordinates: 36°01′40″N 53°49′50″E
- Country: Iran
- Province: Semnan
- County: Damghan
- District: Amirabad
- Rural District: Tuyehdarvar

Population (2016)
  - Total: 71
- Time zone: UTC+3:30 (IRST)

Sartangeh (Persian: سرتنگه) is a village in Tuyehdarvar Rural District of Amirabad District in Damghan County, Semnan province, Iran.

== Demographics ==
=== Population ===
At the time of the 2006 National Census, the village's population was 11 in six households. The following census in 2011 counted 24 people in seven households. The 2016 census measured the population of the village as 71 people in 28 households.
