= Khusf =

City in South Khorasan province, Iran

Khusf Persian: خوسف
- City
- Location within Iran
- Coordinates: 32°46′45″N 58°53′33″E
- Country: Iran
- Province: South Khorasan
- County: Khusf
- District: Central
- Established as a city: 1996

Population (2016)
  - Total: 5,716
- Time zone: UTC+3:30 (IRST)

Khusf (Persian: خوسف) (Note: Also romanized as Khoosaf and Khūsf) is a city in the Central District of Khusf County, South Khorasan province, Iran, serving as capital of both the county and the district. It is also the administrative center for Khusf Rural District. The village of Khusf was converted to a city in 1996.

== Demographics ==
=== Population ===
At the time of the 2006 National Census, the city's population was 3,186 in 929 households, when it was capital of the former Khusf District in Birjand County. The following census in 2011 counted 4,920 people in 1,221 households. The 2016 census measured the population of the city as 5,716 people in 1,544 households, by which time the district had been separated from the county in the establishment of Khusf County. The city was transferred to the new Central District as the county's capital.
