= Kusehha =

Kusehha كوسه ها
- Village
- Location within Iran
- Coordinates: 34°24′29″N 45°58′34″E
- Country: Iran
- Province: Kermanshah
- County: Sarpol-e Zahab
- Bakhsh: Central
- Rural District: Beshiva Pataq

Population (2006)
  - Total: 180
- Time zone: UTC+3:30 (IRST)
  - Summer (DST): UTC+4:30 (IRDT)

Kusehha (Persian: كوسه ها, also Romanized as Kūsehhā and Kūseh Hā; also known as Kūseh and Kūsheh) is a village in Beshiva Pataq Rural District, in the Central District of Sarpol-e Zahab County, Kermanshah Province, Iran. At the 2006 census, its population was 180, in 43 families.
