= Qusheh =

Village in Semnan province, Iran

Qusheh Persian: قوشه
- Village
- Location within Iran
- Coordinates: 35°57′40″N 54°02′17″E
- Country: Iran
- Province: Semnan
- County: Damghan
- District: Amirabad
- Rural District: Tuyehdarvar

Population (2016)
  - Total: 183
- Time zone: UTC+3:30 (IRST)

Qusheh (Persian: قوشه) (Note: Also romanized as Qūsheh; also known as Gusheh, and Qosheh) is a village in Tuyehdarvar Rural District of Amirabad District in Damghan County, Semnan province, Iran.

== Demographics ==
=== Population ===
At the time of the 2006 National Census, the village's population was 135 in 41 households. The following census in 2011 counted 160 people in 64 households. The 2016 census measured the population of the village as 183 people in 61 households.
