= Jolgeh-ye Mazhan Rural District =

Rural district in South Khorasan province, Iran

Jolgeh-ye Mazhan Rural District Persian: دهستان جلگه ماژان
- Rural District
- Location within Iran
- Coordinates: 32°31′N 59°06′E
- Country: Iran
- Province: South Khorasan
- County: Khusf
- District: Jolgeh-ye Mazhan
- Established: 1987
- Capital: Mazhan

Population (2016)
  - Total: 3,520
- Time zone: UTC+3:30 (IRST)

Jolgeh-ye Mazhan Rural District (Persian: دهستان جلگه ماژان) is in Jolgeh-ye Mazhan District of Khusf County, South Khorasan province, Iran. Its capital is the village of Mazhan.

== Demographics ==
=== Population ===
At the time of the 2006 National Census, the rural district's population (as a part of the former Khusf District in Birjand County) was 4,280 in 1,220 households. There were 4,536 inhabitants in 1,360 households at the following census of 2011. The 2016 census measured the population of the rural district as 3,520 in 1,170 households, by which time the district had been separated from the county in the establishment of Khusf County. The rural district was transferred to the new Jolgeh-ye Mazhan District. The most populous of its 89 villages was Mazhan, with 476 people.

=== Other villages in the rural district ===
- Akbarabad
- Asghariyeh
- Dowlatabad
- Giv
- Karijgan
- Kusheh-ye Qeysabad
- Taqiabad
