= Barakuh Rural District =

Rural district in South Khorasan province, Iran

Barakuh Rural District Persian: دهستان براكوه
- Rural District
- Location within Iran
- Coordinates: 32°41′N 59°10′E
- Country: Iran
- Province: South Khorasan
- County: Khusf
- District: Jolgeh-ye Mazhan
- Established: 1990
- Capital: Gol

Population (2016)
  - Total: 2,406
- Time zone: UTC+3:30 (IRST)

Barakuh Rural District (Persian: دهستان براكوه) is in Jolgeh-ye Mazhan District of Khusf County, South Khorasan province, Iran. Its capital is the village of Gol.

== Demographics ==
=== Population ===
At the time of the 2006 National Census, the rural district's population (as a part of the former Khusf District in Birjand County) was 3,919 in 1,283 households. There were 2,496 inhabitants in 946 households at the following census of 2011. The 2016 census measured the population of the rural district as 2,406 in 913 households, by which time the district had been separated from the county in the establishment of Khusf County. The rural district was transferred to the new Jolgeh-ye Mazhan District. The most populous of its 68 villages was Gol, with 489 people.

=== Other villages in the rural district ===
- Aliabad
- Chahkand-e Gol
- Feriz
- Givshad
- Salmabad
- Shahrestanak
