= Qaleh Zari Rural District =

Rural district in South Khorasan province, Iran

Qaleh Zari Rural District Persian: دهستان قلعه زری
- Rural District
- Location within Iran
- Coordinates: 32°04′N 58°41′E
- Country: Iran
- Province: South Khorasan
- County: Khusf
- District: Jolgeh-ye Mazhan
- Established: 1990
- Capital: Aliabad-e Zarein

Population (2016)
  - Total: 3,425
- Time zone: UTC+3:30 (IRST)

Qaleh Zari Rural District (Persian: دهستان قلعه زری) is in Jolgeh-ye Mazhan District of Khusf County, South Khorasan province, Iran. Its capital is the village of Aliabad-e Zarein.

== Demographics ==
=== Population ===
At the time of the 2006 National Census, the rural district's population (as a part of the former Khusf District in Birjand County) was 4,118 in 1,119 households. There were 3,896 inhabitants in 1,141 households at the following census of 2011. The 2016 census measured the population of the rural district as 3,425 in 1,083 households, by which time the district had been separated from the county in the establishment of Khusf County. The rural district was transferred to the new Jolgeh-ye Mazhan District. The most populous of its 57 villages was Madan-e Qaleh Zari, with 1,288 people.

=== Other villages in the rural district ===
- Basiran
- Feyzabad
- Qaleh Zari
- Seyyedan
- Shadan
