= Khusf Rural District =

Rural district in South Khorasan province, Iran

Khusf Rural District Persian: دهستان خوسف
- Rural District
- Location within Iran
- Coordinates: 32°40′N 58°35′E
- Country: Iran
- Province: South Khorasan
- County: Khusf
- District: Central
- Established: 1987
- Capital: Khusf

Population (2016)
  - Total: 6,466
- Time zone: UTC+3:30 (IRST)

Khusf Rural District (Persian: دهستان خوسف) is in the Central District of Khusf County, South Khorasan province, Iran. It is administered from the city of Khusf.

== Demographics ==
=== Population ===
At the time of the 2006 National Census, the rural district's population (as a part of the former Khusf District in Birjand County) was 9,419 in 2,703 households. There were 11,464 inhabitants in 2,853 households at the following census of 2011. The 2016 census measured the population of the rural district as 6,466 in 2,092 households, by which time the district had been separated from the county in the establishment of Khusf County. The rural district was transferred to the new Central District. The most populous of its 49 villages was Taqab, with 967 people.

=== Other villages in the rural district ===
- Fedeshk
- Gusheh-ye Sofla
- Masumabad
- Nasrabad
- Shah Zileh
- Sivjan
