= Central District (Khusf County) =

District in South Khorasan province, Iran

Central District (Khusf County) Persian: بخش مرکزی شهرستان خوسف
- District
- Location within Iran
- Coordinates: 32°47′N 58°33′E
- Country: Iran
- Province: South Khorasan
- County: Khusf
- Established: 2011
- Capital: Khusf

Population (2016)
  - Total: 18,248
- Time zone: UTC+3:30 (IRST)

The Central District of Khusf County (Persian: بخش مرکزی شهرستان خوسف) is in South Khorasan province, Iran. Its capital is the city of Khusf.

== History ==
In 2011, Khusf District was separated from Birjand County in the establishment of Khusf County, which was divided into two districts and five rural districts, with Khusf as its capital.

== Demographics ==
=== Population ===
At the time of the 2016 National Census, the district's population was 18,248 inhabitants in 4,325 households.

=== Administrative divisions ===
Central District (Khusf County) Population
Administrative Divisions	2016
Khusf RD	6,466
Khvor RD	2,476
Khusf (city)	5,716
Mohammadshahr (city) (Note: Formerly the village of Mohammadiyeh)	3,590
Total	18,248
RD = Rural District
