= Jolgeh-ye Mazhan District =

District in South Khorasan province, Iran

Jolgeh-ye Mazhan District Persian: بخش جلگه ماژان
- District
- Location within Iran
- Coordinates: 32°05′N 58°45′E
- Country: Iran
- Province: South Khorasan
- County: Khusf
- Established: 2011
- Capital: Mazhan

Population (2016)
  - Total: 9,351
- Time zone: UTC+3:30 (IRST)

Jolgeh-ye Mazhan District (Persian: بخش جلگه ماژان) is in Khusf County, South Khorasan province, Iran. Its capital is the village of Mazhan.

== History ==
In 2011, Khusf District was separated from Birjand County in the establishment of Khusf County, which was divided into two districts and five rural districts, with the city of Khusf as its capital.

== Demographics ==
=== Population ===
At the time of the 2016 National Census, the district's population was 9,351 inhabitants in 3,166 households.

=== Administrative divisions ===
Jolgeh-ye Mazhan District Population
Administrative Divisions	2016
Barakuh RD	2,406
Jolgeh-ye Mazhan RD	3,520
Qaleh Zari RD	3,425
Total	9,351
RD = Rural District
