= Khusf District =

Former district in South Khorasan province, Iran

Khusf District Persian: بخش خوسف
- Former District
- Location within Iran
- Coordinates: 32°19′N 58°38′E
- Country: Iran
- Province: South Khorasan
- County: Birjand
- Capital: Khusf

Population (2011)
  - Total: 29,019
- Time zone: UTC+3:30 (IRST)

Khusf District (Persian: بخش خوسف) is a former administrative division of Birjand County, South Khorasan province, Iran. Its capital was the city of Khusf.

== History ==
In 2007, the village of Mohammadiyeh was converted to a city and renamed Mohammadshahr. In 2011, the district was separated from the county in the establishment of Khusf County.

== Demographics ==
=== Population ===
At the time of the 2006 National Census, the district's population was 24,922 in 7,254 households. The following census in 2011 counted 29,019 people in 7,564 households.

=== Administrative divisions ===
Khusf District Population
Administrative Divisions	2006	2011
Barakuh RD	3,919	2,496
Jolgeh-ye Mazhan RD	4,280	4,536
Khusf RD	9,419	11,464
Qaleh Zari RD	4,118	3,896
Khusf (city)	3,186	4,920
Mohammadshahr (city) (Note: Formerly the village of Mohammadiyeh)		1,707
Total	24,922	29,019
RD = Rural District
