= Khusf County =

County in South Khorasan province, Iran

Khusf County Persian: شهرستان خوسف
- County
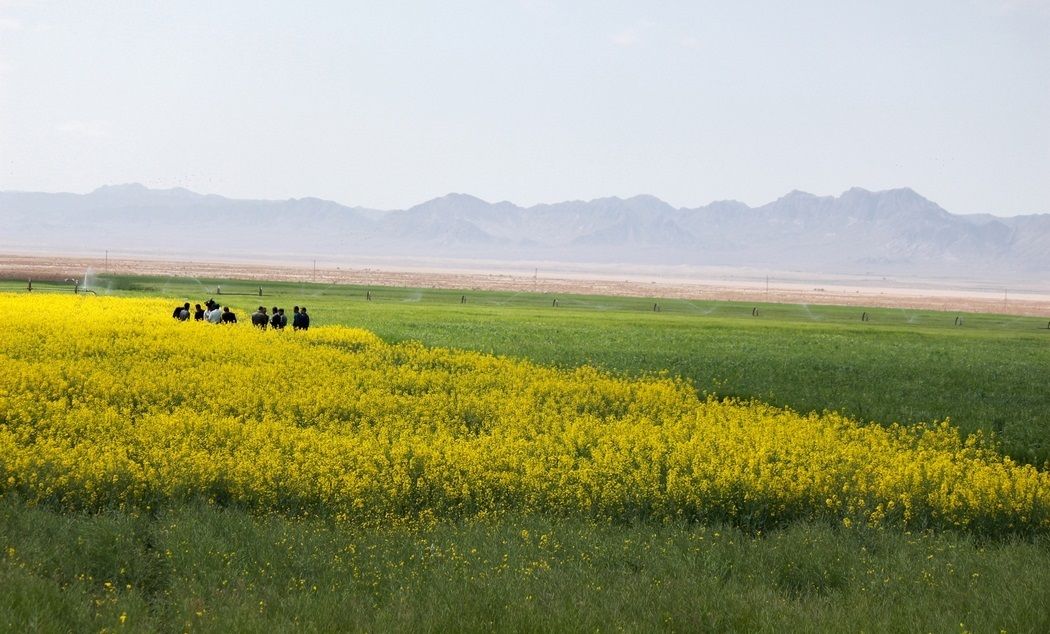
- Rapeseed fields in Khusf County

- Location of Khusf County in South Khorasan province (bottom, pink)

- Location of South Khorasan province in Iran
- Coordinates: 32°19′N 58°38′E
- Country: Iran
- Province: South Khorasan
- Established: 2011
- Capital: Khusf
- Districts: Central, Jolgeh-e Mazhan

Population (2016)
  - Total: 27,600
- Time zone: UTC+3:30 (IRST)

Khusf County (Persian: شهرستان خوسف) is in South Khorasan province, Iran. Its capital is the city of Khusf.

== History ==
In 2011, Khusf District was separated from Birjand County in the establishment of Khusf County, which was divided into two districts and five rural districts, with Khusf as its capital.

== Demographics ==
=== Population ===
At the time of the 2016 National Census, the county's population was 27,600 in 7,492 households.

=== Administrative divisions ===
Khusf County's population and administrative structure are shown in the following table.

Khusf County Population
Administrative Divisions	2016
Central District	18,248
Khusf RD	6,466
Khvor RD	2,476
Khusf (city)	5,716
Mohammadshahr (city) (Note: Formerly the village of Mohammadiyeh)	3,590
Jolgeh-ye Mazhan District	9,351
Barakuh RD	2,406
Jolgeh-ye Mazhan RD	3,520
Qaleh Zari RD	3,425
Total	27,600
RD = Rural District

== See also ==
Media related to Khusf County at Wikimedia Commons
