= Persepolis =

Ceremonial capital of the Achaemenid Empire

- 𐎱𐎠𐎼𐎿 (Old Persian); تخت جمشید (Persian)
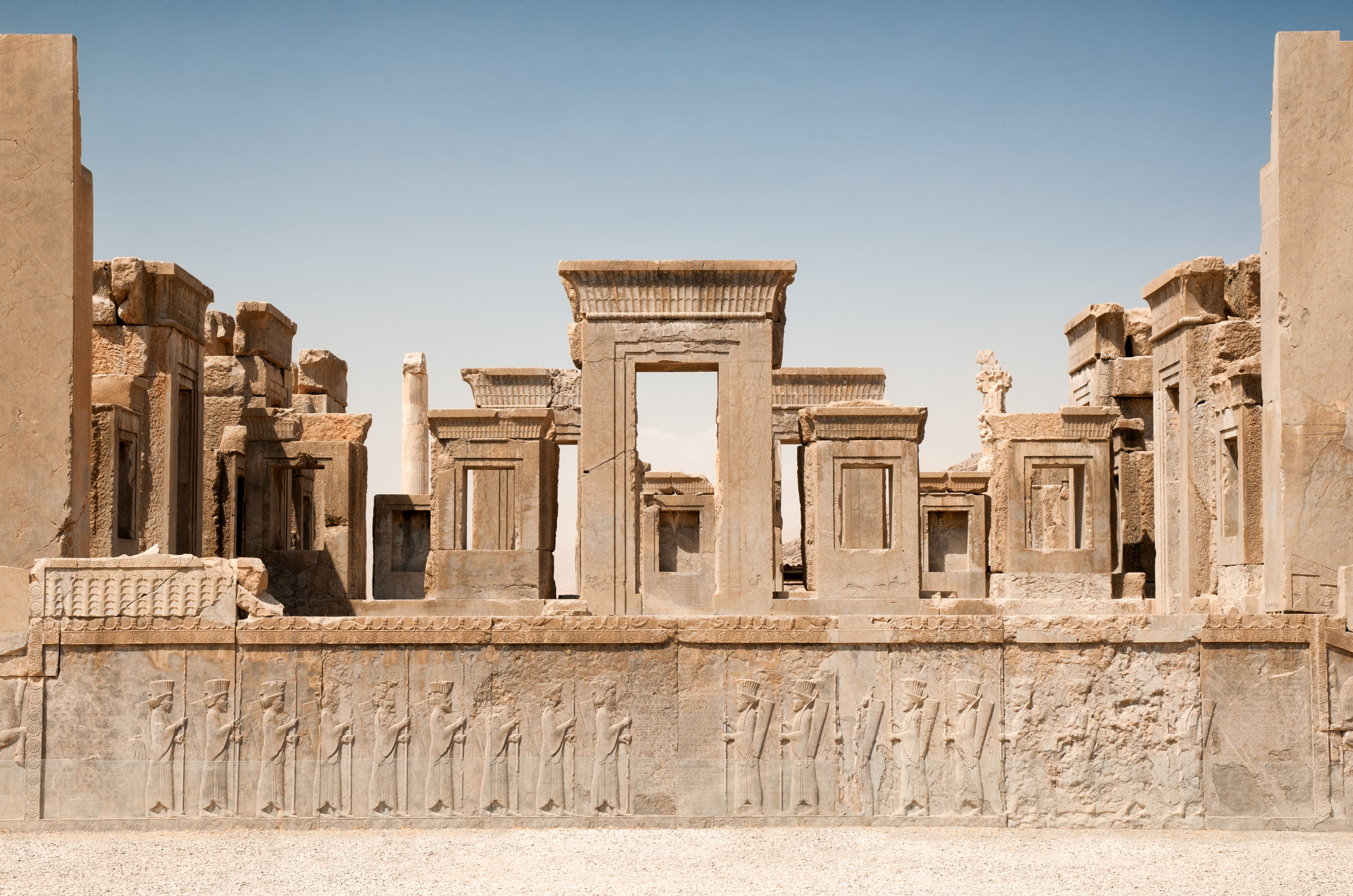
- The Tachara in Persepolis

- Location within Iran Location within West and Central Asia
- Interactive map of Persepolis
- 29.935°N 52.890°E
- Type: Settlement
- Periods: Achaemenid Empire
- Cultures: Persian
- Location: Marvdasht, Fars province, Iran

History
- Built: 6th century BC
- Built by: Darius I, Xerxes I and Artaxerxes I
- Abandoned: 330 BC
- Events: Battle of the Persian Gates; Macedonian sack of Persepolis; Nowruz; The 2,500 Year Celebration of the Persian Empire

Site notes
- Material: Limestone, mud-brick, cedar wood
- Architectural style: Achaemenid
- Public access: Open
- Website: persepolis.ir

Iran National Heritage List
- Official name: Persepolis
- Type: Settlement
- Designated: 1931
- Reference no.: 20
- Conservation organization: Cultural Heritage, Handicrafts and Tourism Organization of Iran

UNESCO World Heritage Site
- Official name: Persepolis
- Type: Cultural
- Criteria: i, iii, vi
- Designated: 1979 (3rd session)
- Reference no.: 114
- Region: Asia-Pacific

Persepolis (Note: /pərˈsɛpəlɪs/; Old Persian: 𐎱𐎠𐎼𐎿, romanized: Pārsa; New Persian: تخت جمشید, romanized: Takht-e Jamshīd, lit. 'Throne of Jamshid') was the ceremonial capital of the Achaemenid Empire (c. 550–330 BC). It is situated in the plains of Marvdasht, encircled by the southern Zagros Mountains, Fars province of Iran. It is one of the key Iranian cultural heritage sites and a UNESCO World Heritage Site.

The earliest remains of Persepolis date back to 515 BC. The city, acting as a major center for the empire, housed a palace complex and citadel designed to serve as the focal point for governance and ceremonial activities. It exemplifies the Achaemenid style of architecture. The complex was taken by the army of Alexander the Great in 330 BC, and soon after, its wooden parts were completely destroyed by fire. According to one theory, Alexander deliberately set fire to Persepolis to avenge the destruction of Athens by the Persians; a second theory is that it was at the urging of Thaïs, a courtesan, during a feast when Alexander was intoxicated.

The exact function of Persepolis remains unclear. It was not one of the largest cities in ancient Iran, let alone the rest of the empire, but appears to have been a grand ceremonial complex that was only occupied seasonally; the complex was raised high on a walled platform, with five "palaces" or halls of varying size, and grand entrances. It is still not entirely clear where the king's private quarters actually were. Until recently, most archaeologists held that it was primarily used for celebrating Nowruz, the Persian New Year, held at the spring equinox, which is still an important annual festivity in Iran. The Iranian nobility and the tributary parts of the empire came to present gifts to the king, as represented in the stairway reliefs. It is also unclear what permanent structures there were outside the palace complex; due to these factors, Persepolis is more often referred to as a complex rather than a "city" in the usual sense.

The exploration of Persepolis from the early 17th century led to the modern rediscovery of cuneiform writing and, from detailed studies of the trilingual Achaemenid royal inscriptions found on the ruins, the initial decipherment of cuneiform in the early 19th century.

== Name ==
Persepolis is derived from the Greek Περσέπολις, Persepolis, a compound of Pérsēs (Πέρσης) and pólis (πόλις, together meaning "the Persian city" or "the city of the Persians"). To the ancient Persians, the city was known as Pārsa (Old Persian: 𐎱𐎠𐎼𐎿), which is also the word for the region of Persia.

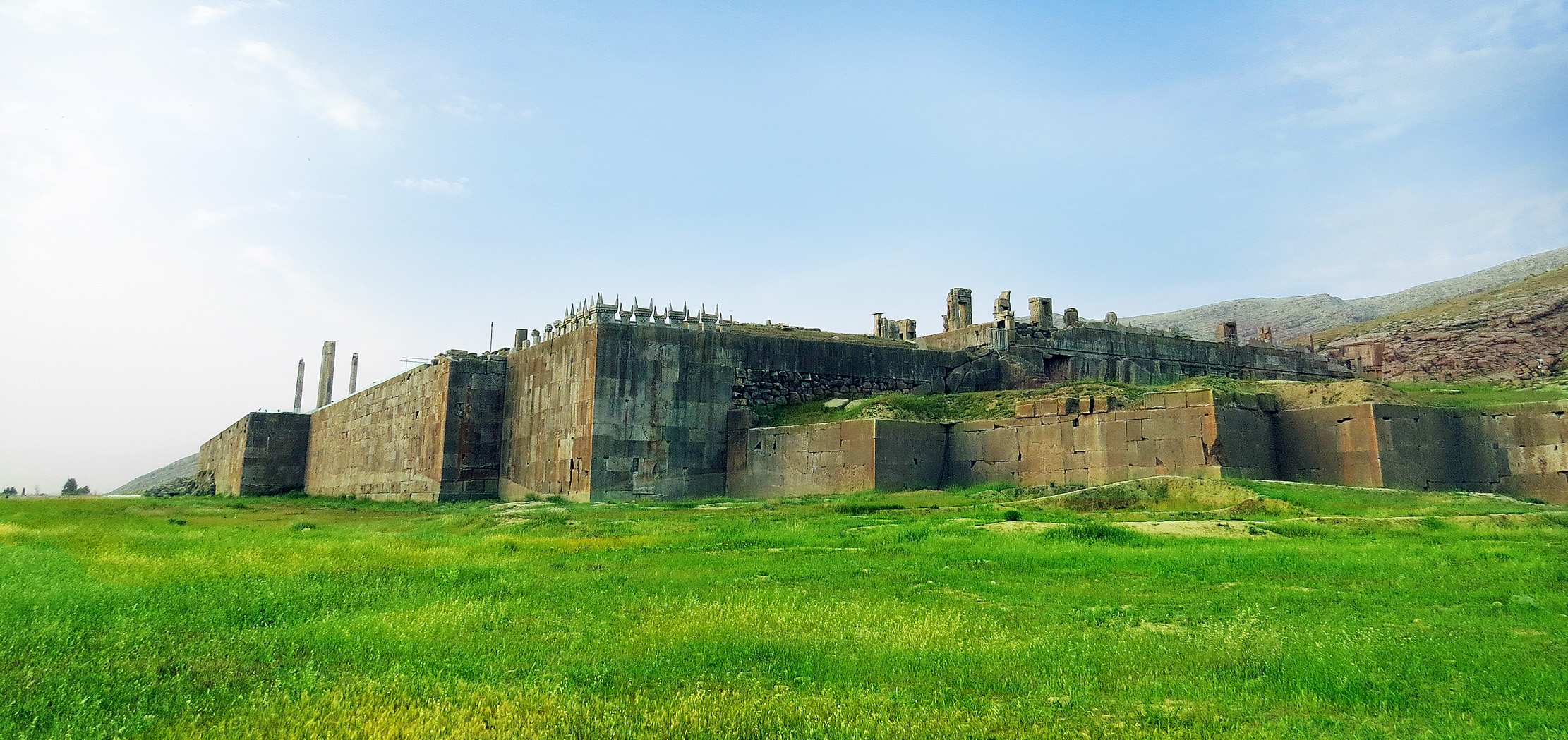
As is typical of Achaemenid cities, Persepolis was built on a (partially) artificial platform.

An inscription left in 311 AD by Sasanian Prince Shapur Sakanshah, the son of Hormizd II, refers to the site as Sad-stūn, meaning "Hundred Pillars". Because medieval Persians attributed the site to Jamshid, a king from Iranian mythology, it has been referred to as Takht-e-Jamshid (Persian: تخت جمشید, Taxt e Jamšīd; [ˌtæxtedʒæmˈʃiːd]), literally meaning "Throne of Jamshid". Another name given to the site in the medieval period was Čehel Menâr (Persian: چهل منار, "Forty Minarets"), transcribed as Chilminara in De Silva Figueroa and as Chilminar in early English sources.

== History ==
=== Construction ===
External videos
- Online 3D virtual tour of restored Persepolis as it would have appeared during the reign of Xerxes I by The Getty Museum

Archaeological evidence shows that the earliest remains of Persepolis date back to 515 BC. André Godard, the French archaeologist who excavated Persepolis in the early 1930s, believed that it was Cyrus the Great who chose the site of Persepolis, but that it was Darius I who built the terrace and the palaces. Inscriptions on these buildings support the belief that they were constructed by Darius.

With Darius I, the sceptre passed to a new branch of the royal house. The country's true capitals were Susa, Babylon and Ecbatana. This may be why the Greeks were not acquainted with the city until Alexander the Great took and plundered it.

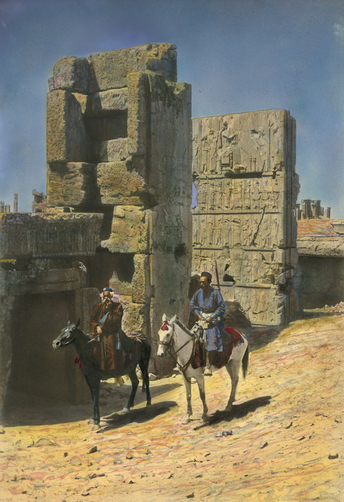
Persepolis in 1920s, hand painted photo by Harold Weston

Darius I's construction of Persepolis was carried out parallel to that of the Palace of Susa. According to Gene R. Garthwaite, the Susa Palace served as Darius' model for Persepolis. Darius I ordered the construction of the Apadana and the Council Hall (Tripylon or the "Triple Gate"), as well as the main imperial Treasury and its surroundings. These were completed during the reign of his son, Xerxes I. Further construction of the buildings on the terrace continued until the downfall of the Achaemenid Empire. According to the Encyclopædia Britannica, the Greek historian Ctesias mentioned that Darius I's grave was in a cliff face that could be reached with an apparatus of ropes.

Around 519 BC, construction of a broad stairway was begun. Grey limestone was the main building material used at Persepolis. The uneven plan of the terrace, including the foundation, acted like a castle, whose angled walls enabled its defenders to target any section of the external front.

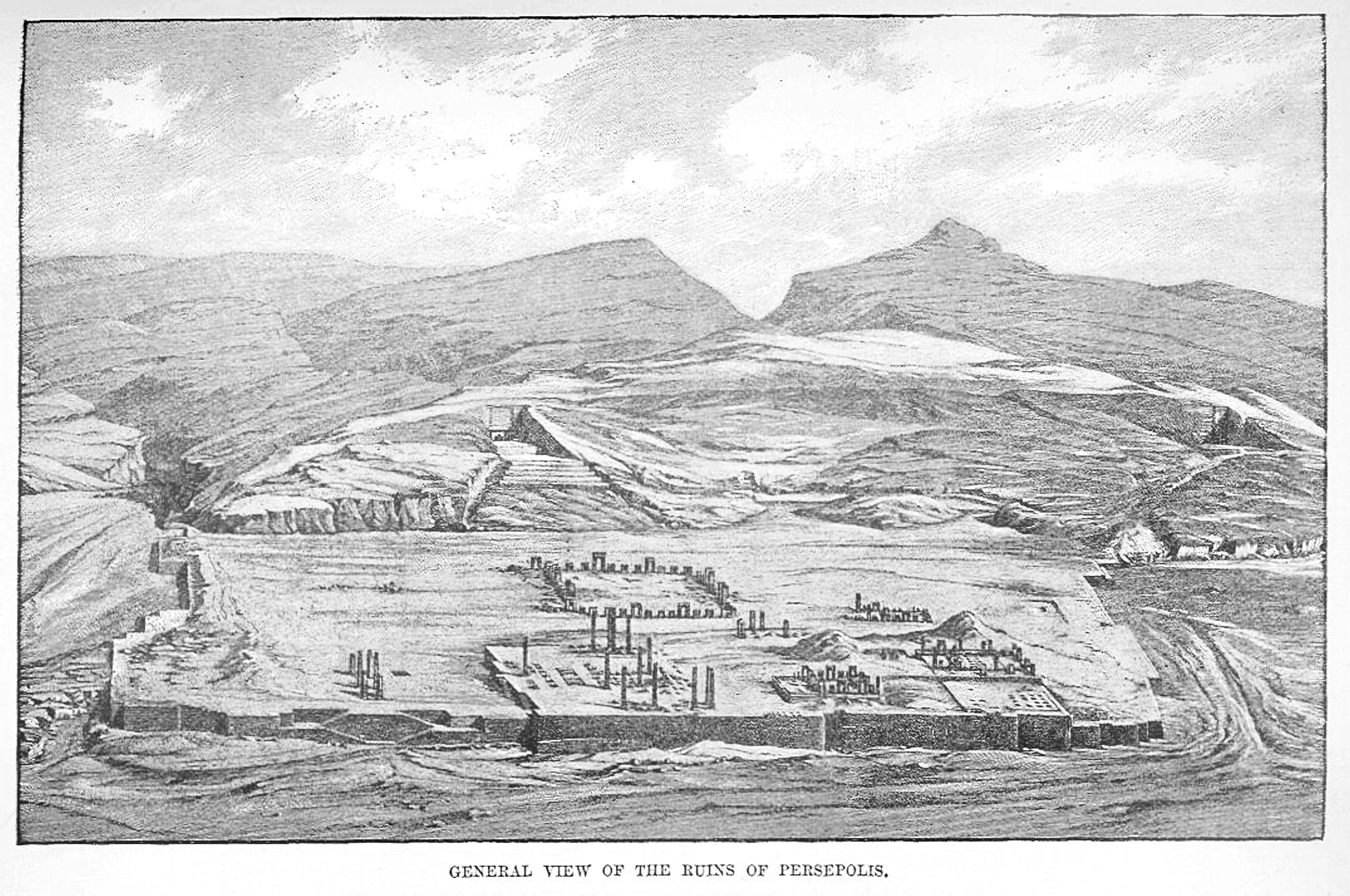
General view of the Persepolis

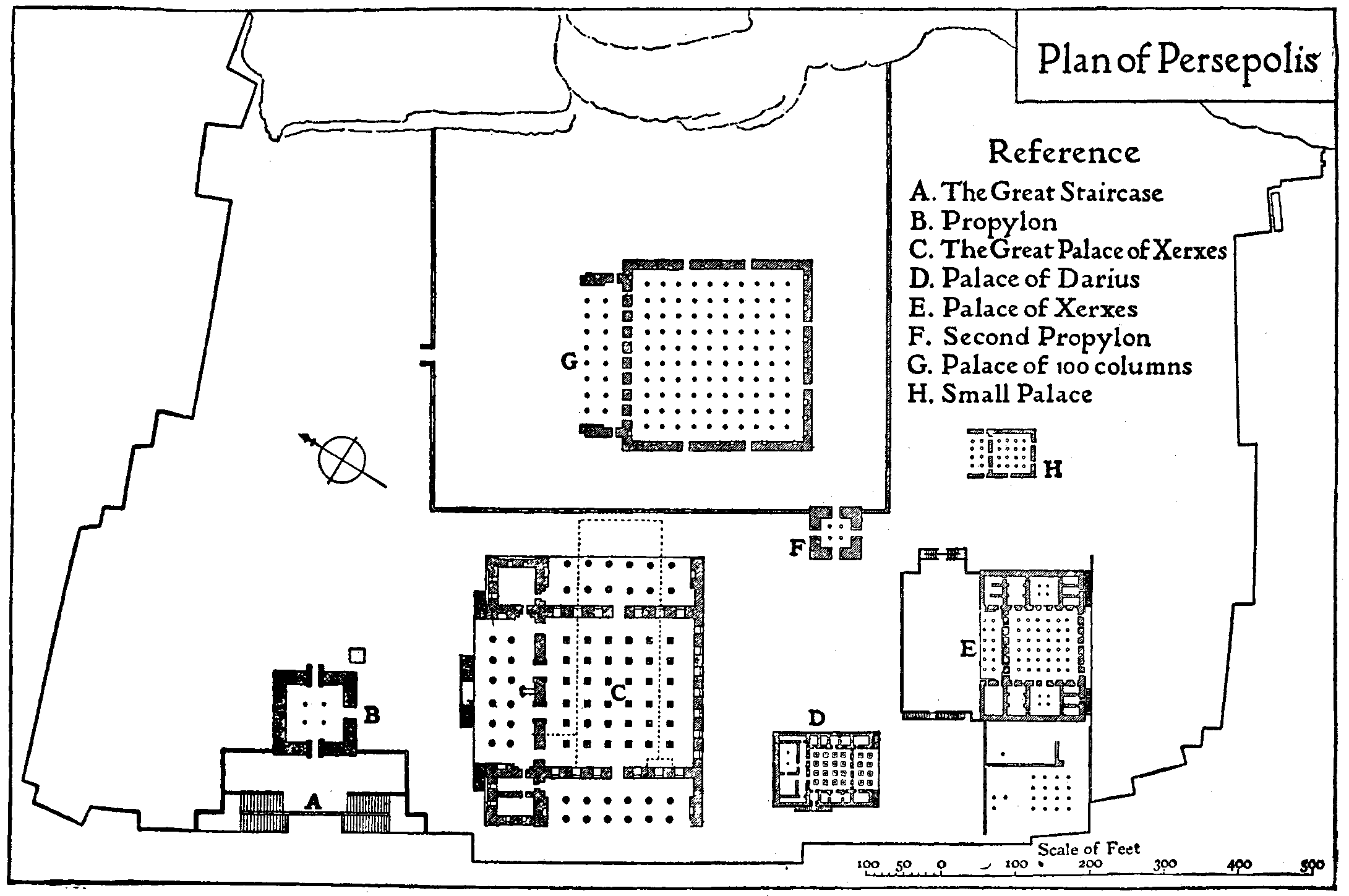
Aerial architectural plan of Persepolis

Animated reconstruction of Persepolis

=== Destruction ===
After invading Achaemenid Persia in 330 BC, Alexander the Great sent the main force of his army to Persepolis by the Royal Road. Diodorus Siculus writes that on his way to the city, Alexander and his army were met by 800 Greek artisans who had been captured by the Persians. Most were elderly and suffered some form of mutilation, such as a missing hand or foot. They explained to Alexander the Persians wanted to take advantage of their skills in the city but handicapped them so they could not easily escape. Alexander and his staff were disturbed by the story and provided the artisans with clothing and provisions before continuing on to Persepolis. Diodorus does not cite this as a reason for the destruction of Persepolis, but it is possible Alexander started to see the city in a negative light after this encounter.

Upon reaching the city, Alexander stormed the Persian Gates, a pass through Zagros Mountains. There, Ariobarzanes of Persis successfully ambushed Alexander the Great's army, inflicting heavy casualties. After being held off for 31 days, Alexander the Great outflanked and destroyed the defenders. Ariobarzanes himself was killed either during the battle or during the retreat to Persepolis. Some sources indicate that the Persians were betrayed by a captured tribal chief who showed the Greeks an alternate path that allowed them to outflank Ariobarzanes in a reversal of Thermopylae. After several months, Alexander allowed his troops to loot Persepolis.

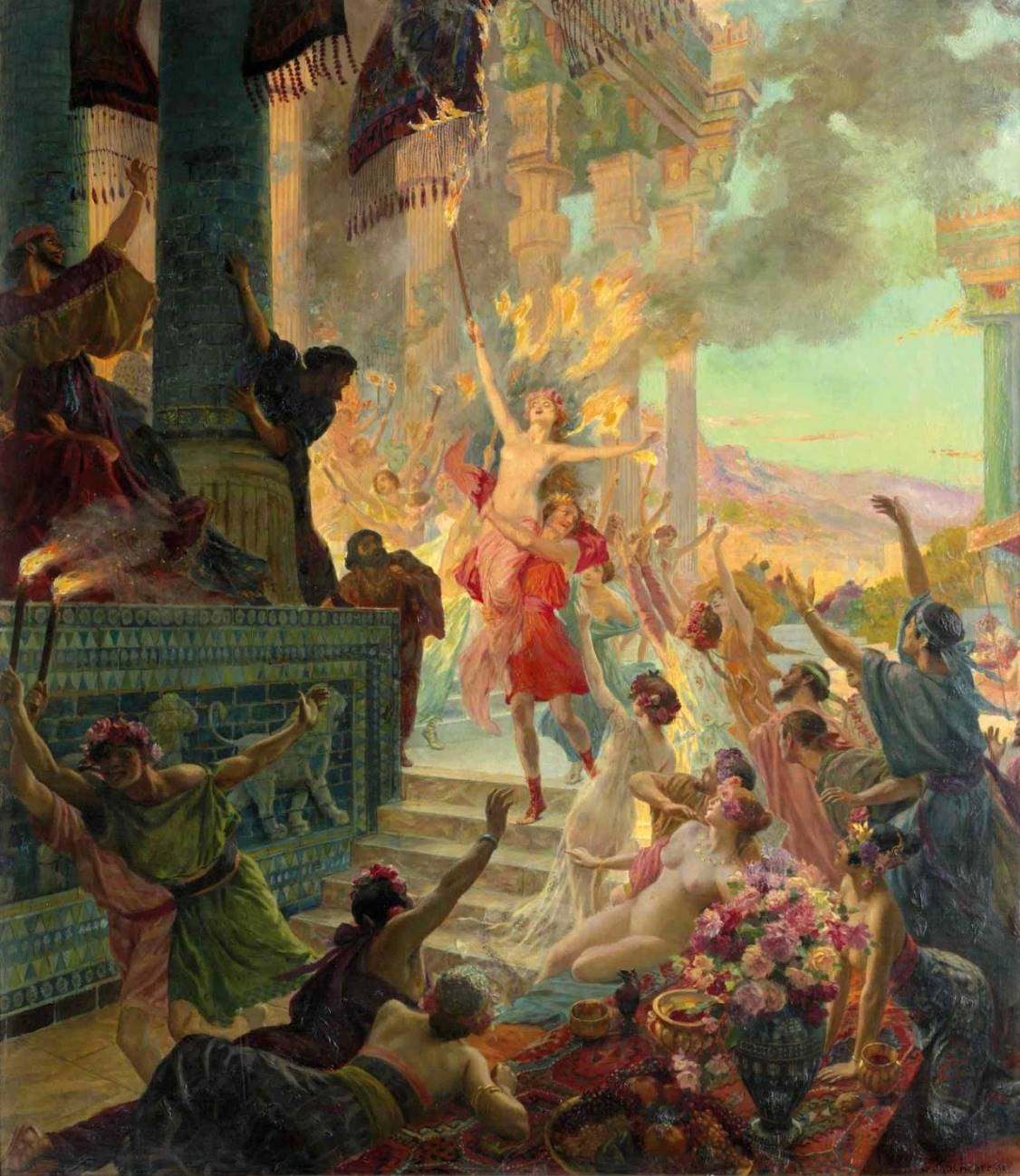
"The Burning of Persepolis", led by Thaïs, 1890, by Georges-Antoine Rochegrosse

Around that time, a fire burned "the palaces" or "the palace".

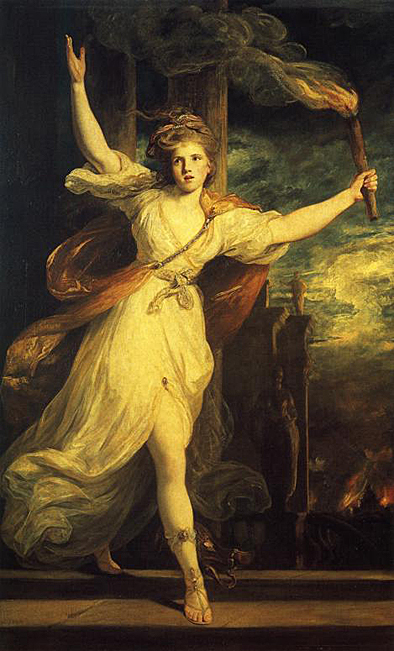
Thaïs setting fire to Persepolis

It is believed that the fire which destroyed Persepolis started from Hadish Palace, which was the living quarters of Xerxes I, and spread to the rest of the city. It is not clear if the fire was an accident or a deliberate act of revenge for the burning of the Acropolis of Athens during the second Persian invasion of Greece. Many historians argue that, while Alexander's army celebrated with a symposium, they decided to take revenge against the Persians. If that is so, then the destruction of Persepolis could be both an accident and a case of revenge. The fire may also have had the political purpose of destroying an iconic symbol of the Persian monarchy that might have become a focus for Persian resistance.

Several, much later, Greek and Roman accounts (including Plutarch, Diodorus Siculus and Quintus Curtius Rufus) describe that the burning was the idea of Thaïs, mistress of Alexander's general Ptolemy I Soter, and possibly of Alexander himself. She is said to have suggested it during a very drunken celebration, according to some accounts to revenge the destruction of Greek sanctuaries (she was from Athens), and either she or Alexander himself set the fire going.

The Book of Arda Wiraz, a Zoroastrian work composed in the 3rd or 4th century, describes Persepolis' archives as containing "all the Avesta and Zend, written upon prepared cow-skins, and with gold ink", which were destroyed. Indeed, in his Chronology of the Ancient Nations, the native Iranian writer Biruni indicates unavailability of certain native Iranian historiographical sources in the post-Achaemenid era, especially during the Parthian Empire. He adds: "[Alexander] burned the whole of Persepolis as revenge to the Persians, because it seems the Persian King Xerxes had burnt the Greek City of Athens around 150 years ago. People say that, even at the present time, the traces of fire are visible in some places."

On the upside, the fire that destroyed those texts may have preserved the Persepolis Administrative Archives by preventing them from being lost over time to natural and man-made events. According to archaeological evidence, the partial burning of Persepolis did not damage what are now referred to as the Persepolis Fortification Archive tablets, but rather may have caused the eventual collapse of the upper part of the northern fortification wall, preserving the tablets until their recovery by the Oriental Institute's archaeologists.

=== After the fall of the Achaemenid Empire ===
In 316 BC, Persepolis was still the capital of Persia as a province of the great Macedonian Empire (see Diodorus Siculus xix, 21 seq., 46; probably after Hieronymus of Cardia, who was living about 326). The city must have gradually declined in the course of time. The lower city at the foot of the imperial city might have survived for a longer time; but the ruins of the Achaemenids remained as a witness to its ancient glory.

The nearby Estakhr gained prominence as a separate city very shortly after the decline of Persepolis. It appears that much of Persepolis' rubble was used for the building of Istakhr. At the time of the Muslim invasion of Persia, Estakhr offered a desperate resistance. It was still a place of considerable importance in the first century of Islam, although its greatness was speedily eclipsed by the new metropolis of Shiraz. In the 10th century, Estakhr dwindled to insignificance. During the following centuries, Estakhr gradually declined, until it ceased to exist as a city.

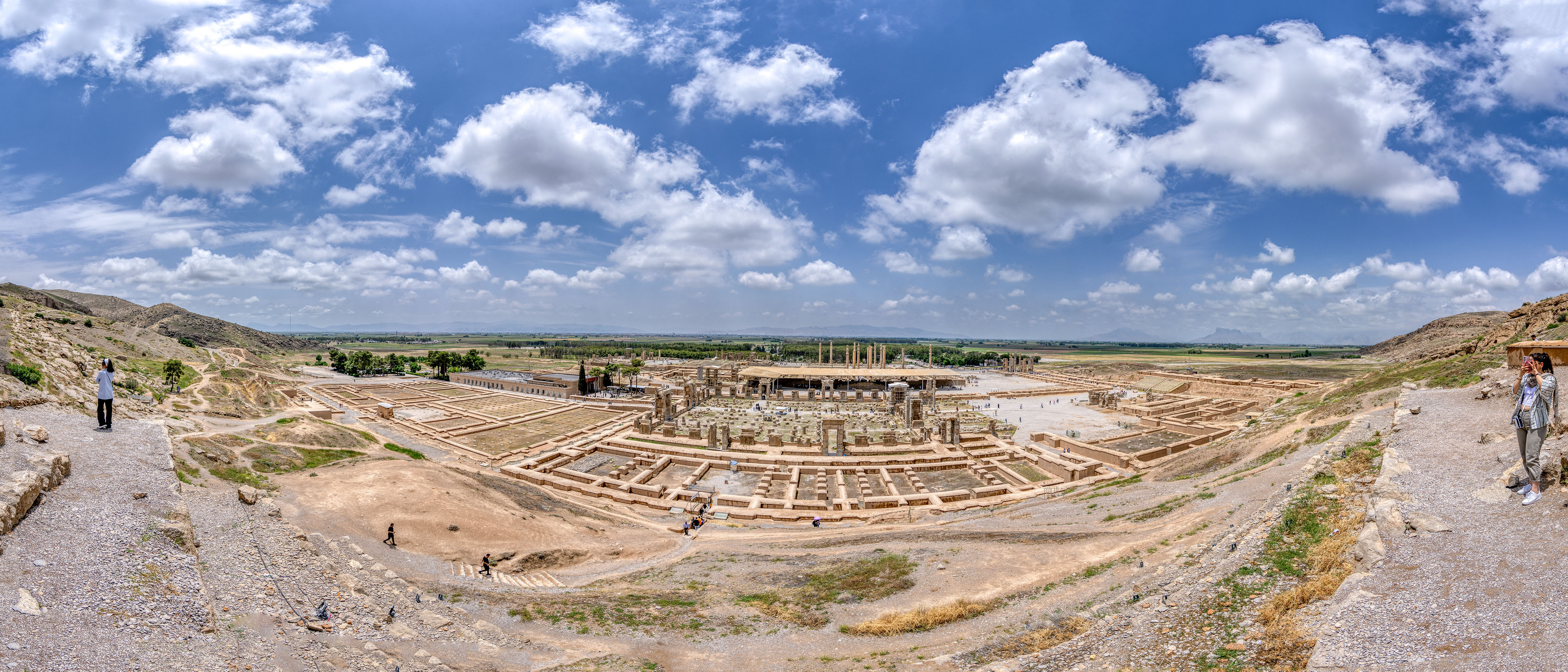
Persepolis Panorama (17 May 2024)

== Geography ==
Persepolis is near the small river Pulvar, which flows into the Kur River. The site includes a 125,000 m^{2} (1,350,000 sq ft) terrace, partly artificially constructed and partly cut out of a mountain, with its east side leaning on Rahmat Mountain.

== Archaeological research ==
Odoric of Pordenone may have passed through Persepolis on his way to China in 1320, although he mentioned only a great, ruined city called "Comerum". In 1474, Giosafat Barbaro visited the ruins of Persepolis, which he incorrectly thought were of Jewish origin. Hakluyt's Voyages included a general account of the ruins of Persepolis attributed to an English merchant who visited Iran in 1568. António de Gouveia from Portugal wrote about cuneiform inscriptions following his visit in 1602. His report on the ruins of Persepolis was published as part of his Relaçam in 1611.

In 1618, García de Silva Figueroa, King Philip III of Spain's ambassador to the court of Abbas I, the Safavid monarch, was the first Western traveler to link the site known in Iran as "Chehel Minar" as the site known from Classical authors as Persepolis.

Pietro Della Valle visited Persepolis in 1621, and noticed that only 25 of the 72 original columns were still standing, due to either vandalism or natural processes. The Dutch traveler Cornelis de Bruijn visited Persepolis in 1704.

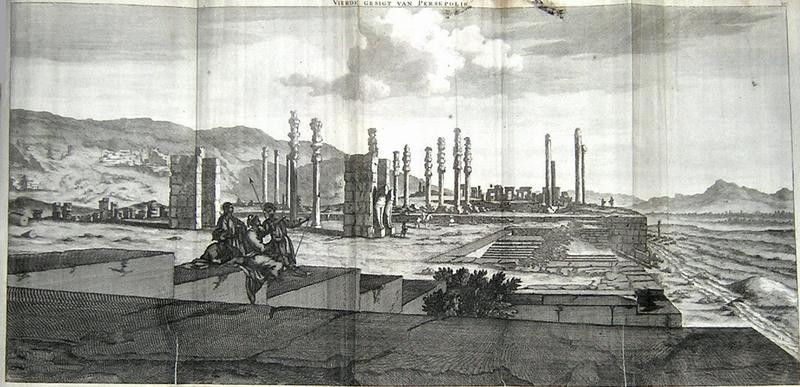
Sketch of Persepolis from 1704 by Cornelis de Bruijn

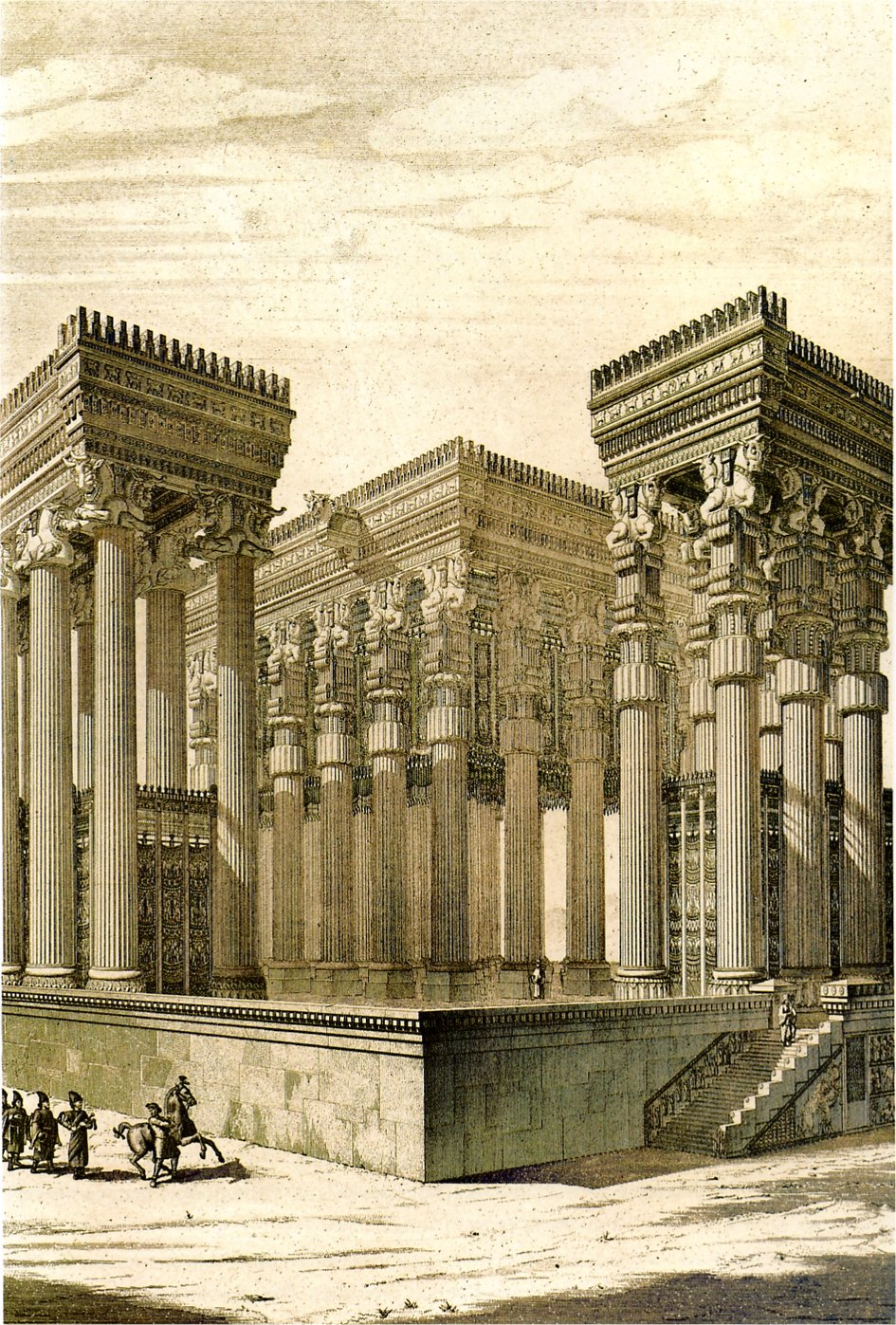
The Apadana by Charles Chipiez

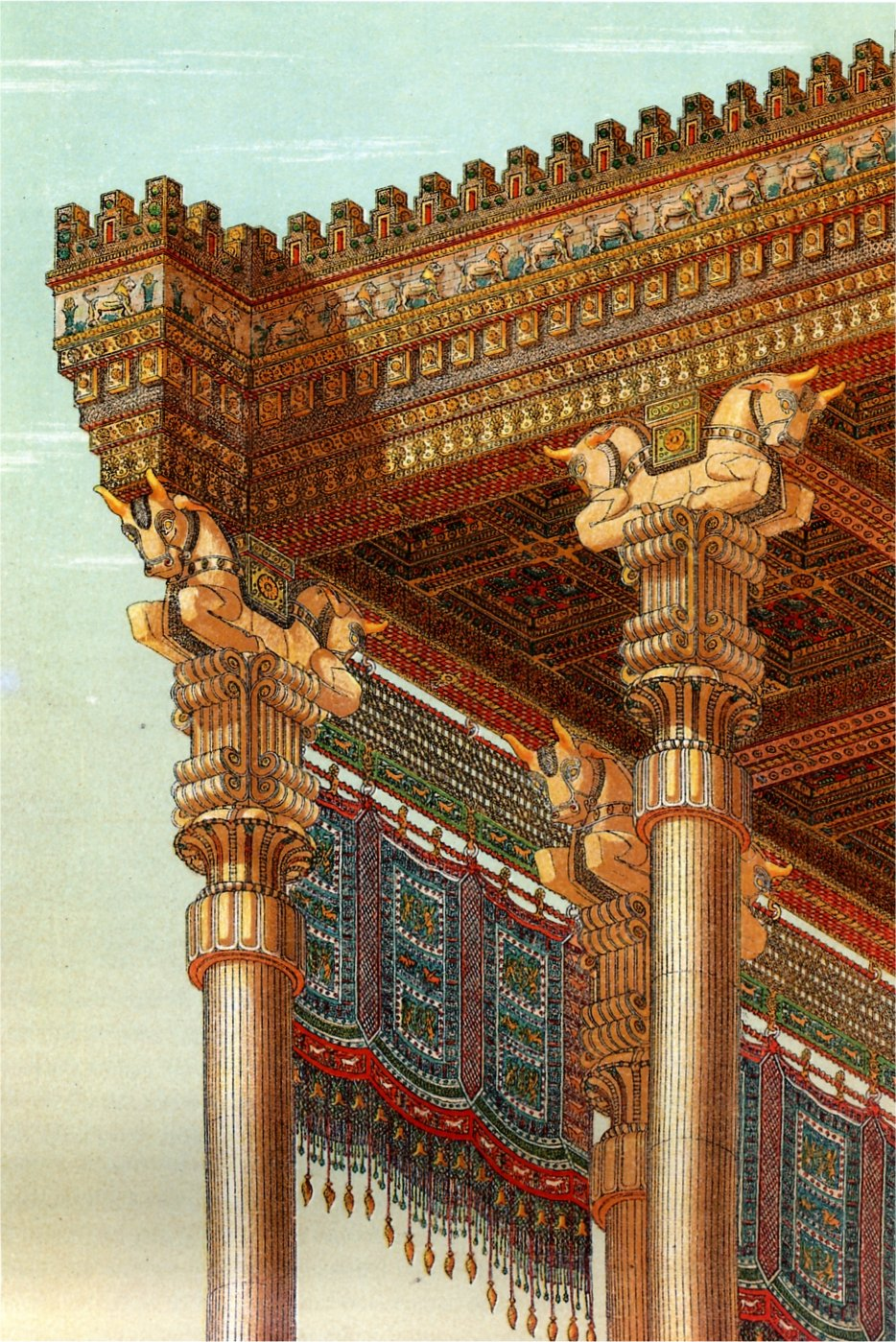
Apadana detail by Charles Chipiez

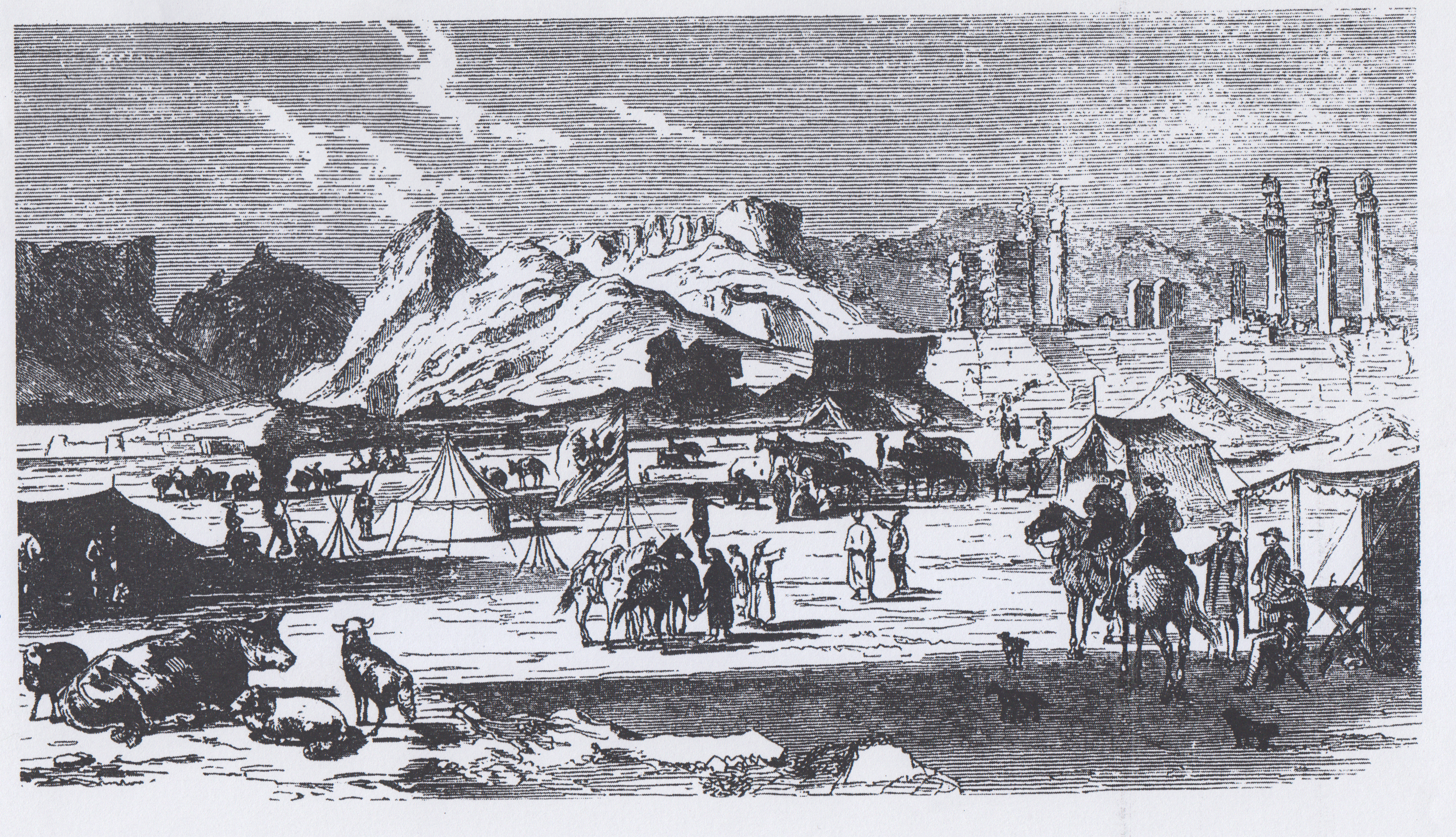
Prussia board at Persepolis, 1862–1863

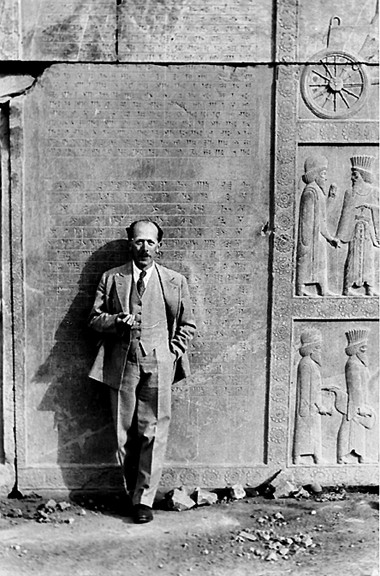
The first scientific explorations in Persepolis were conducted by Ernst Herzfeld in 1931

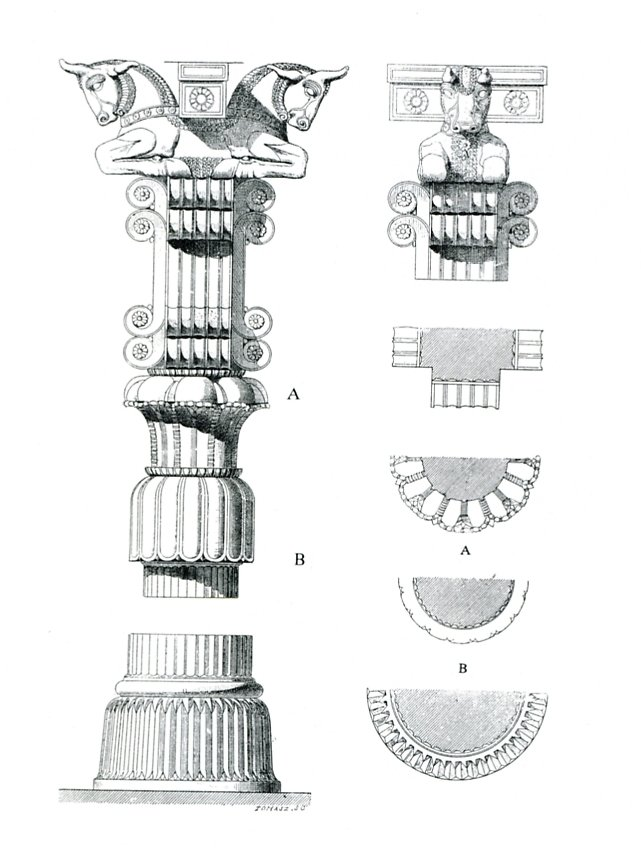
The design and details of the columns of Persepolis

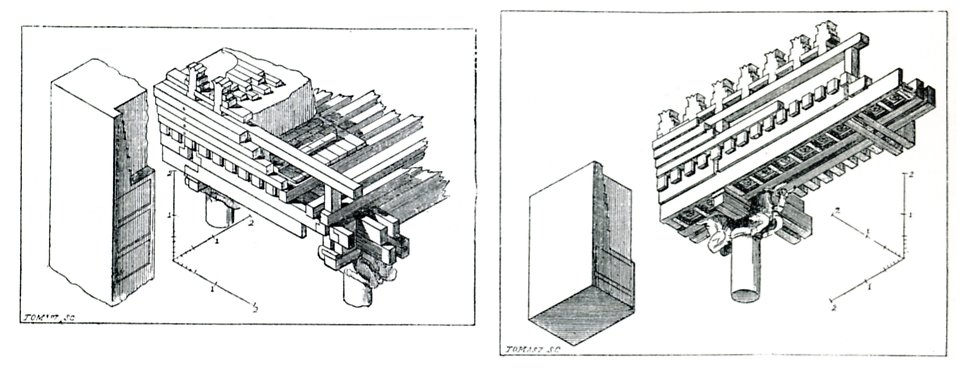
Roof design of palaces at Persepolis

The fruitful region was covered with villages until its frightful devastation in the 18th century; and even now it is, comparatively speaking, well cultivated. The Castle of Estakhr played a conspicuous part as a strong fortress, several times, during the Muslim period. It was the middlemost and the highest of the three steep crags which rise from the valley of the Kur, at some distance to the west or northwest of the necropolis of Naqsh-e Rustam.

The French voyagers Eugène Flandin and Pascal Coste are among the first to provide not only a literary review of the structure of Persepolis, but also to create some of the best and earliest visual depictions of its structure. In their publications in Paris, in 1881 and 1882, titled Voyages en Perse de MM. Eugene Flanin peintre et Pascal Coste architecte, the authors provided some 350 ground breaking illustrations of Persepolis. French influence and interest in Persia's archaeological findings continued after the accession of Reza Shah, when André Godard became the first director of the archeological service of Iran.

In the 1800s, a variety of amateur digging occurred at the site, in some cases on a large scale.

The first scientific excavations at Persepolis were carried out by Ernst Herzfeld and Erich Schmidt representing the Oriental Institute of the University of Chicago. They conducted excavations for eight seasons, beginning in 1930, and included other nearby sites.

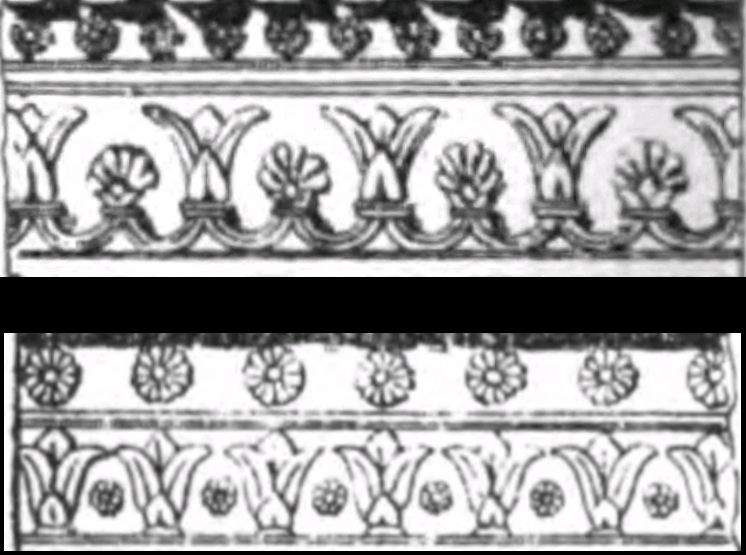
Frieze designs at Persepolis

Herzfeld believed that the reasons behind the construction of Persepolis were the need for a majestic atmosphere, a symbol for the empire, and to celebrate special events, especially the Nowruz. For historical reasons, Persepolis was built where the Achaemenid dynasty was founded, although it was not the center of the empire at that time.

Excavations of plaque fragments hint at a scene with a contest between Herakles and Apollo, dubbed A Greek painting at Persepolis.

=== Architecture ===
Persepolitan architecture is noted for its use of the Persian column, which was probably based on earlier wooden columns.

The buildings at Persepolis include three general groupings: military quarters, the treasury, and the reception halls and occasional houses for the King. Noted structures include the Great Stairway, the Gate of All Nations, the Apadana, the Hall of a Hundred Columns, the Tripylon Hall and the Tachara, the Hadish Palace, the Palace of Artaxerxes III, the Imperial Treasury, the Royal Stables, and the Chariot House.

=== Tol-e Ajori ===
In 2011 a joint Italian-Iranian team discovered a monumental gateway that strongly resembles the Ishtar Gate in Babylon at the site of Tol-e Ajori 3 kilometers west of Persepolis. The gate, which has been dated to the Achaemenid Period, measures 40 by 30 meters and features glazed brick decoration produced in the same manner and featuring the same motifs as the glazed bricks used to adorn the Ishtar gate and the rest of the ceremonial procession in Babylon. However, the structure does not fit neatly into the architectural style used for the rest of the Persepolis area. Similarly, excavations yielded fragments of inscriptions in both Elamite and Babylonian, however the gate does not seem to have included an Old Persian inscription. Based on these discontinuities with the rest of the Persepolis area, excavators concluded the gate likely predates the construction of Persepolis under Darius I, and was probably built sometime between the conquest of Babylon in 539 and the start of construction at Persepolis in 518 BCE.

== Remains ==
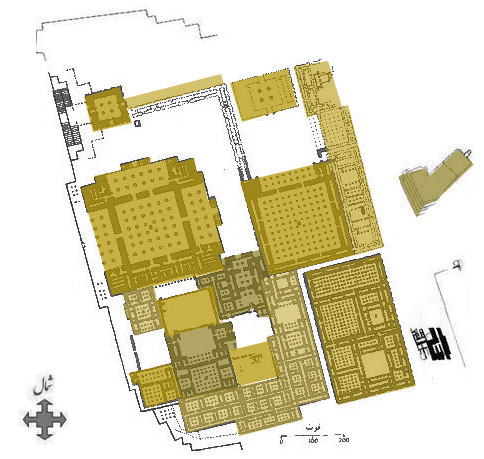
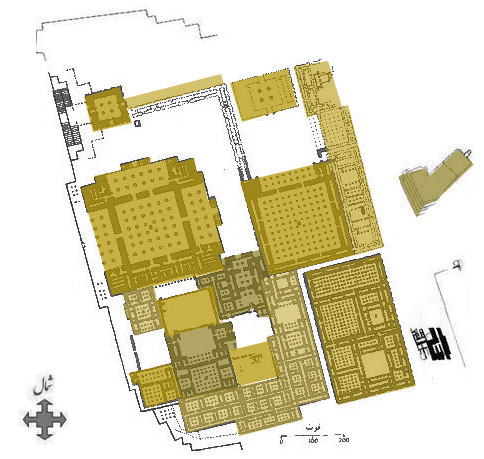

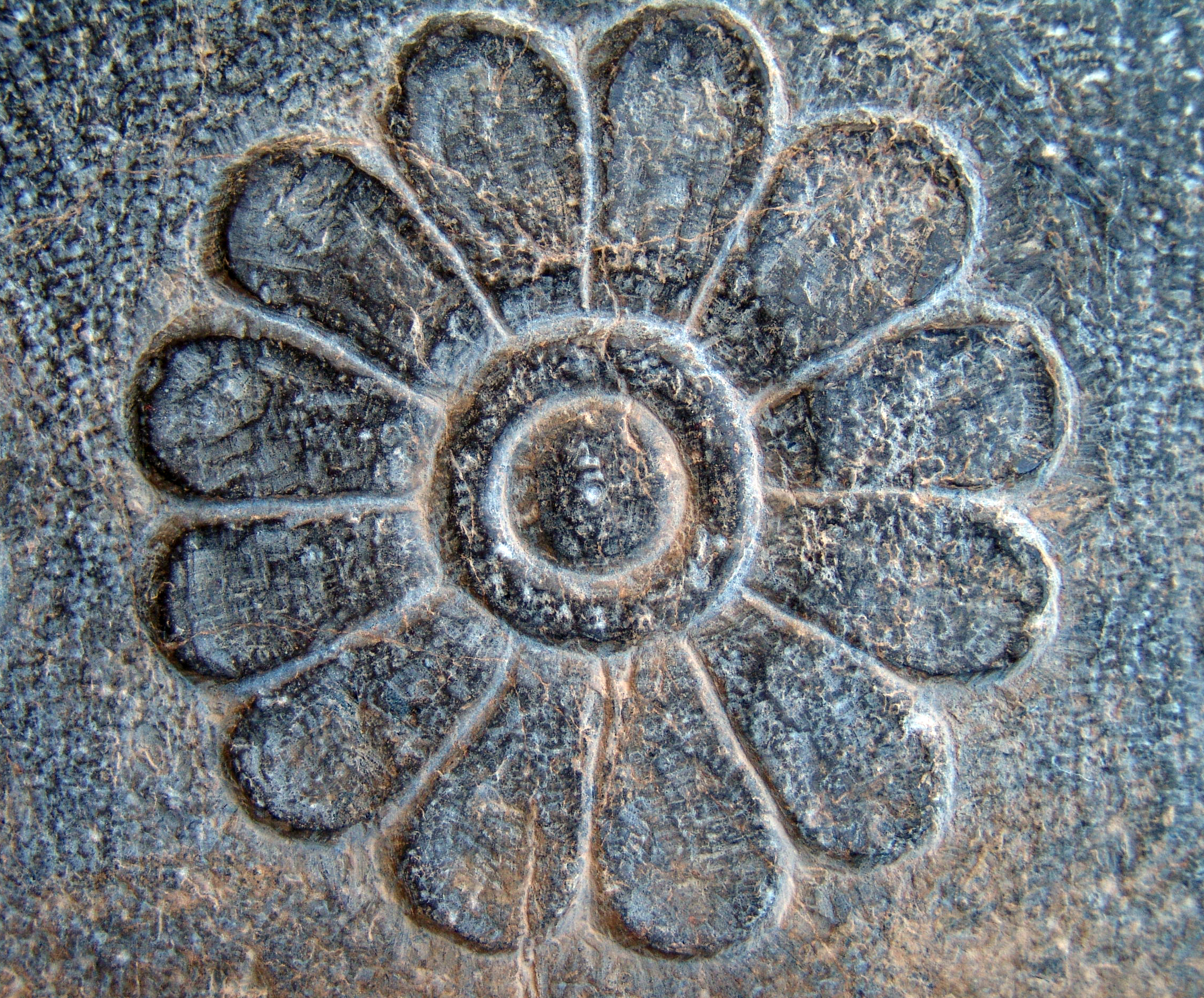
Reliefs of lotus flowers are frequently used on the walls and monuments at Persepolis.

Ruins of a number of colossal buildings exist on the terrace. All are constructed of dark-grey marble. Fifteen of their pillars stand intact. Three more pillars have been re-erected since 1970. Several of the buildings were never finished.

Behind the compound at Persepolis, there are three sepulchers hewn out of the rock in the hillside.

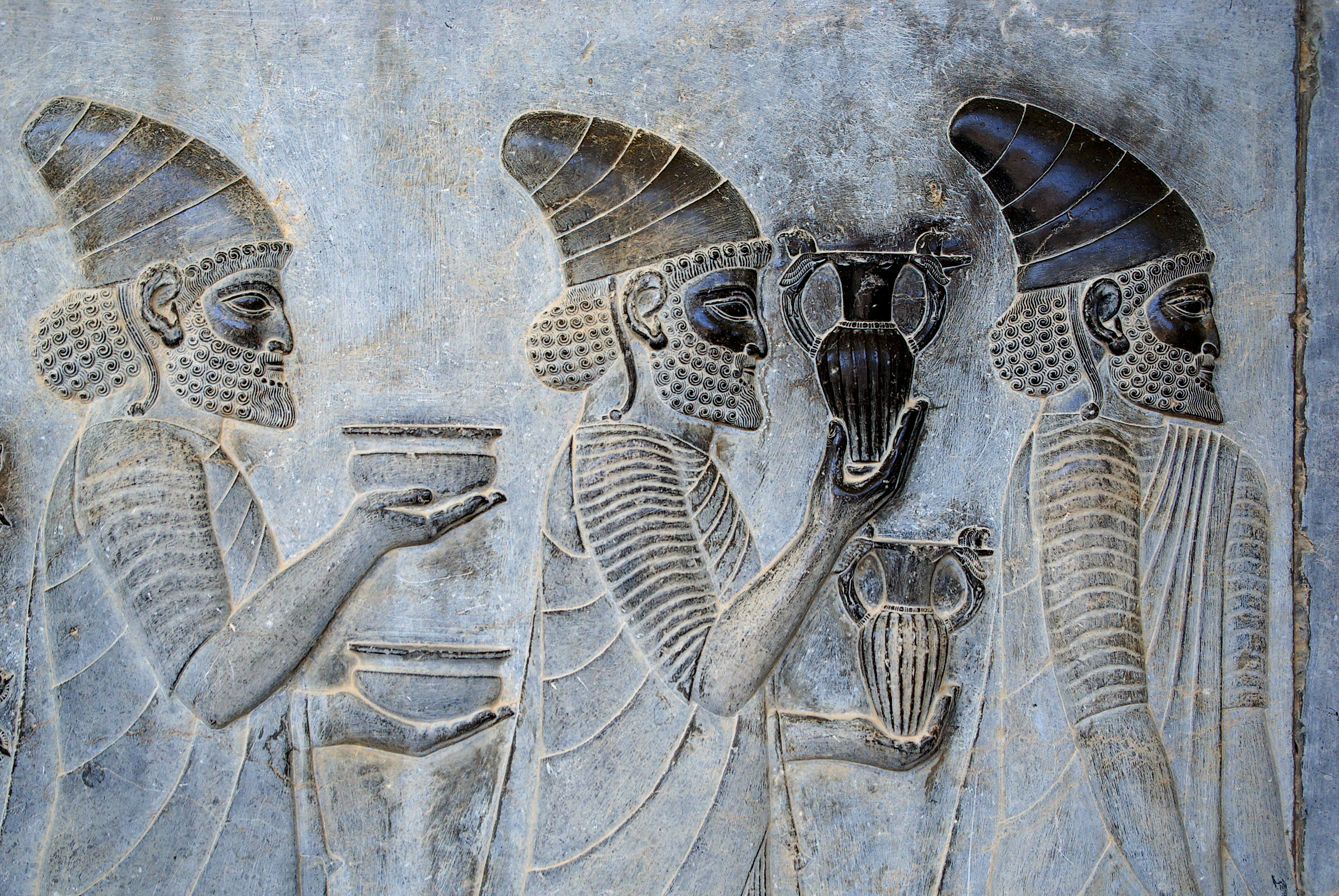
A bas-relief from the Apadana Palace depicting Delegations including Lydians and Armenians bringing their famous wine to the king.

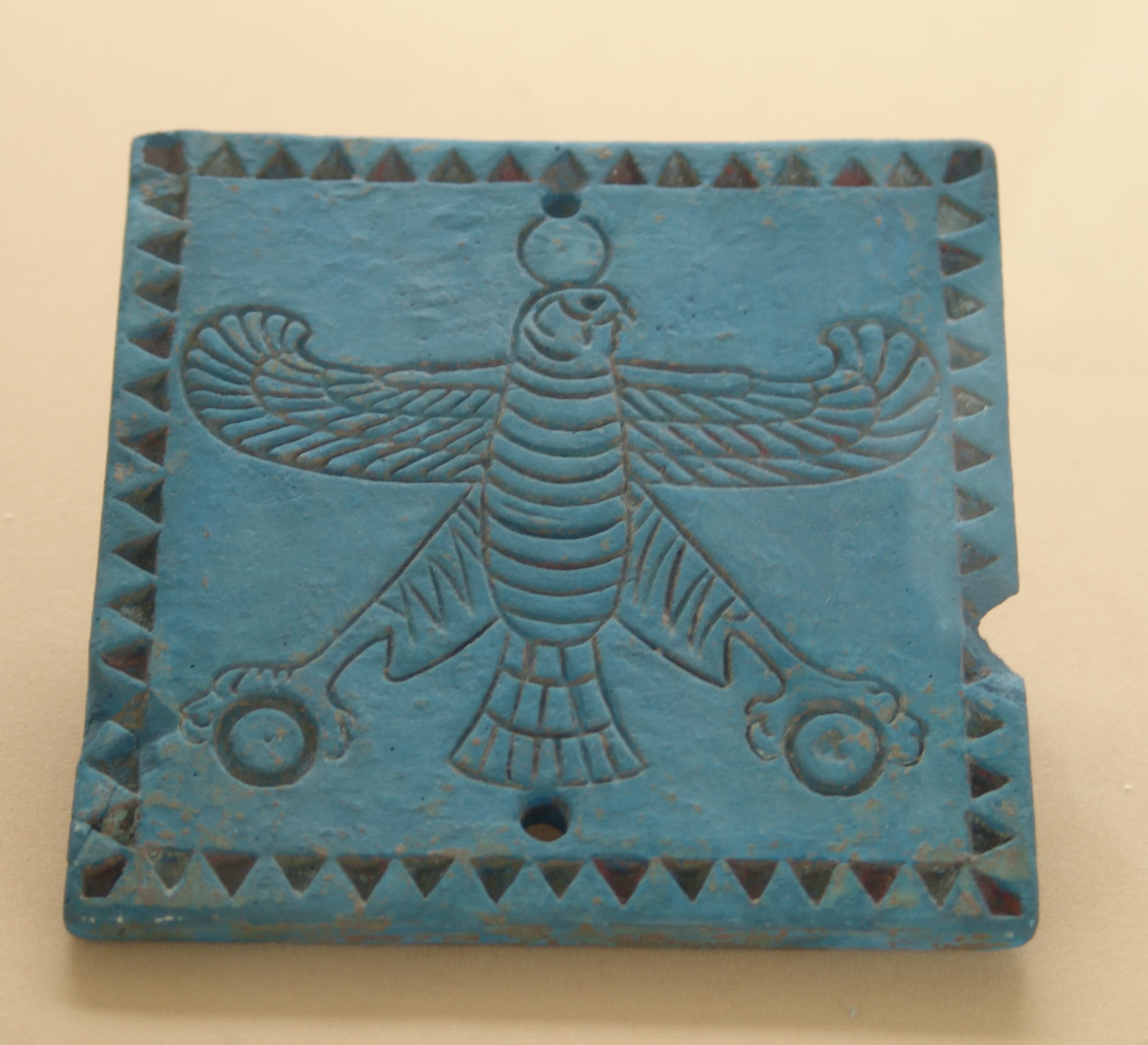
Achaemenid plaque from Persepolis, kept at the National Museum of Iran.

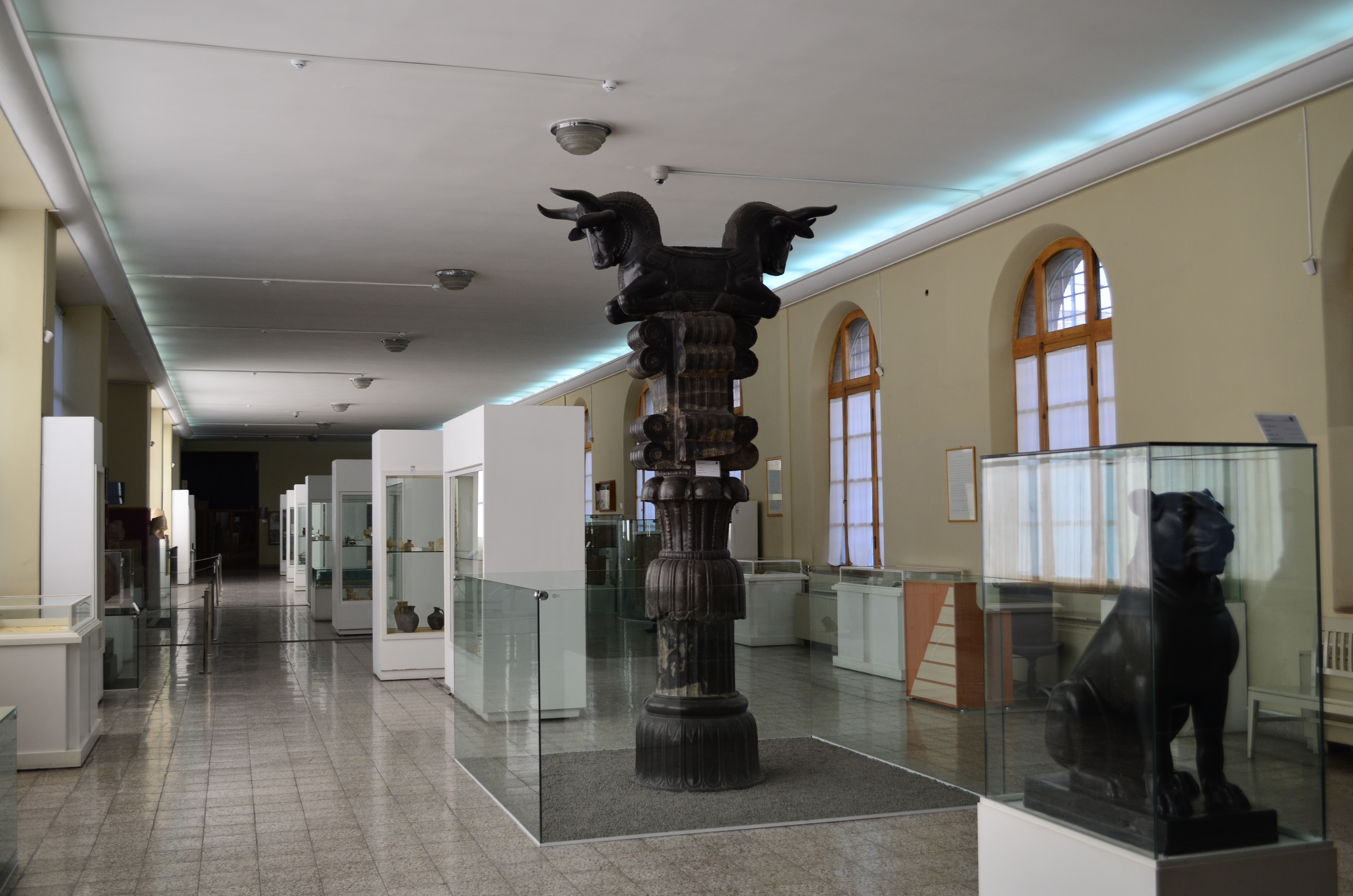
Objects from Persepolis kept at the National Museum of Iran

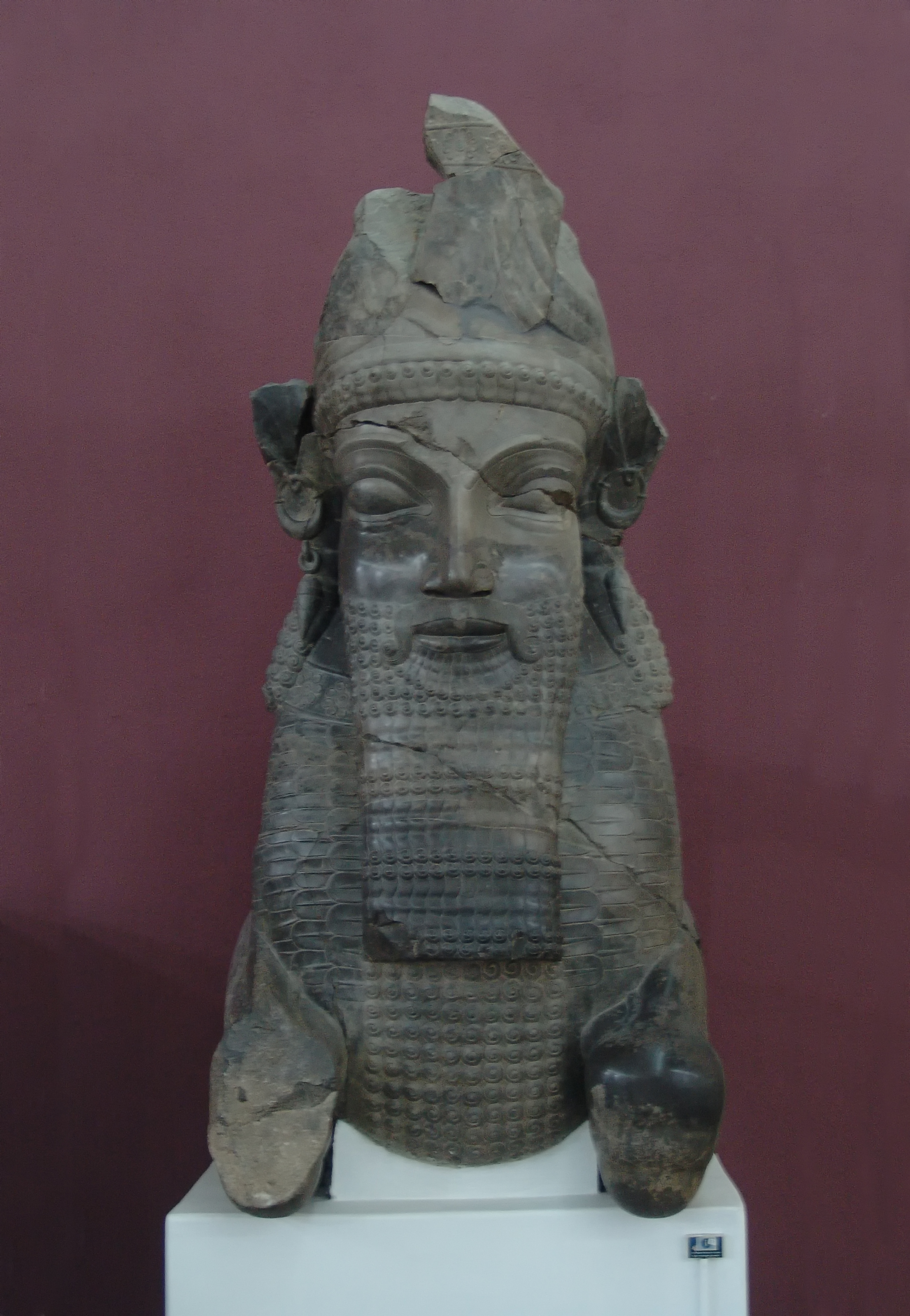
The head of a Lamassu from Persepolis, kept at the National Museum of Iran

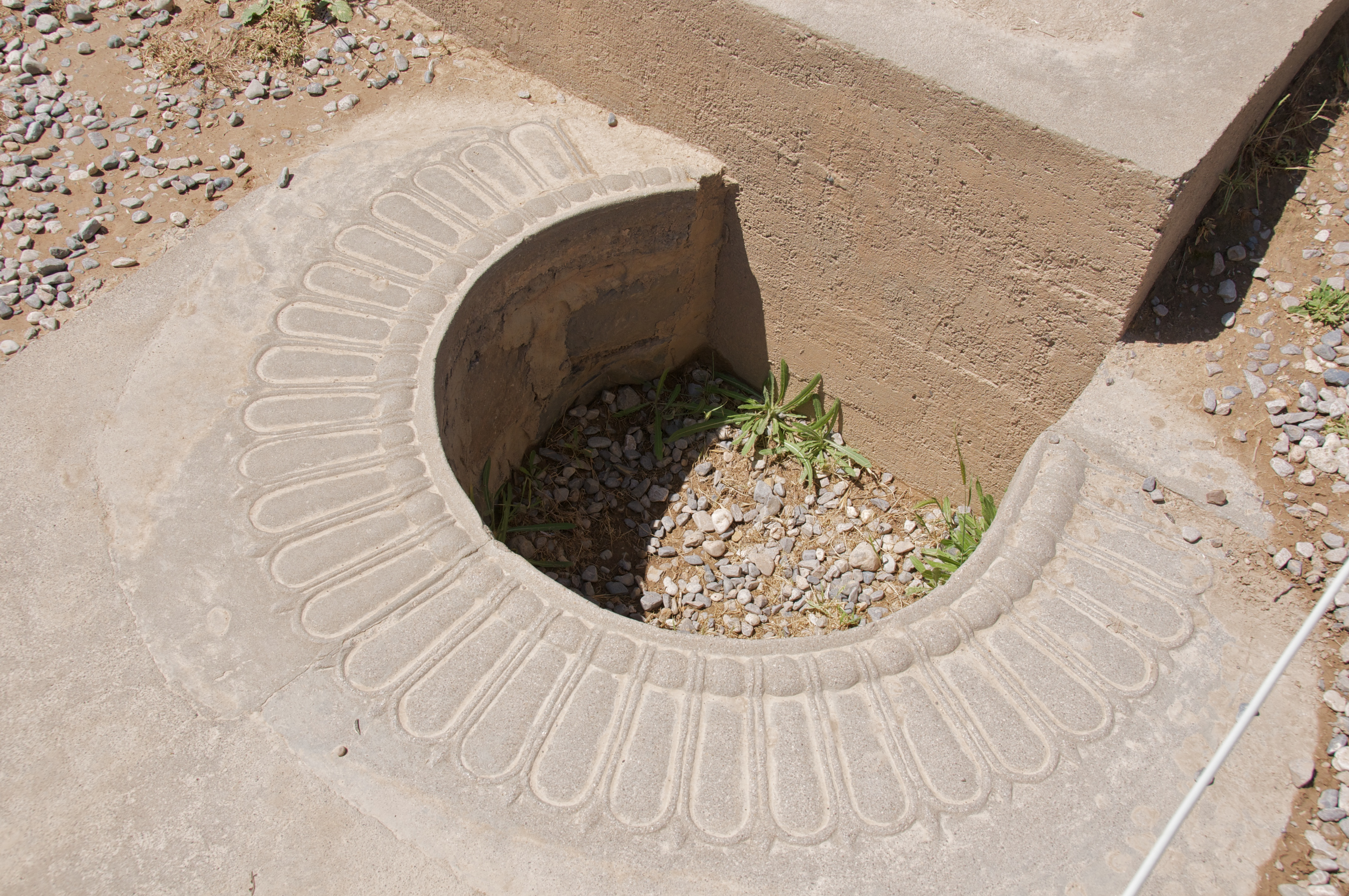
Door-Post Socket

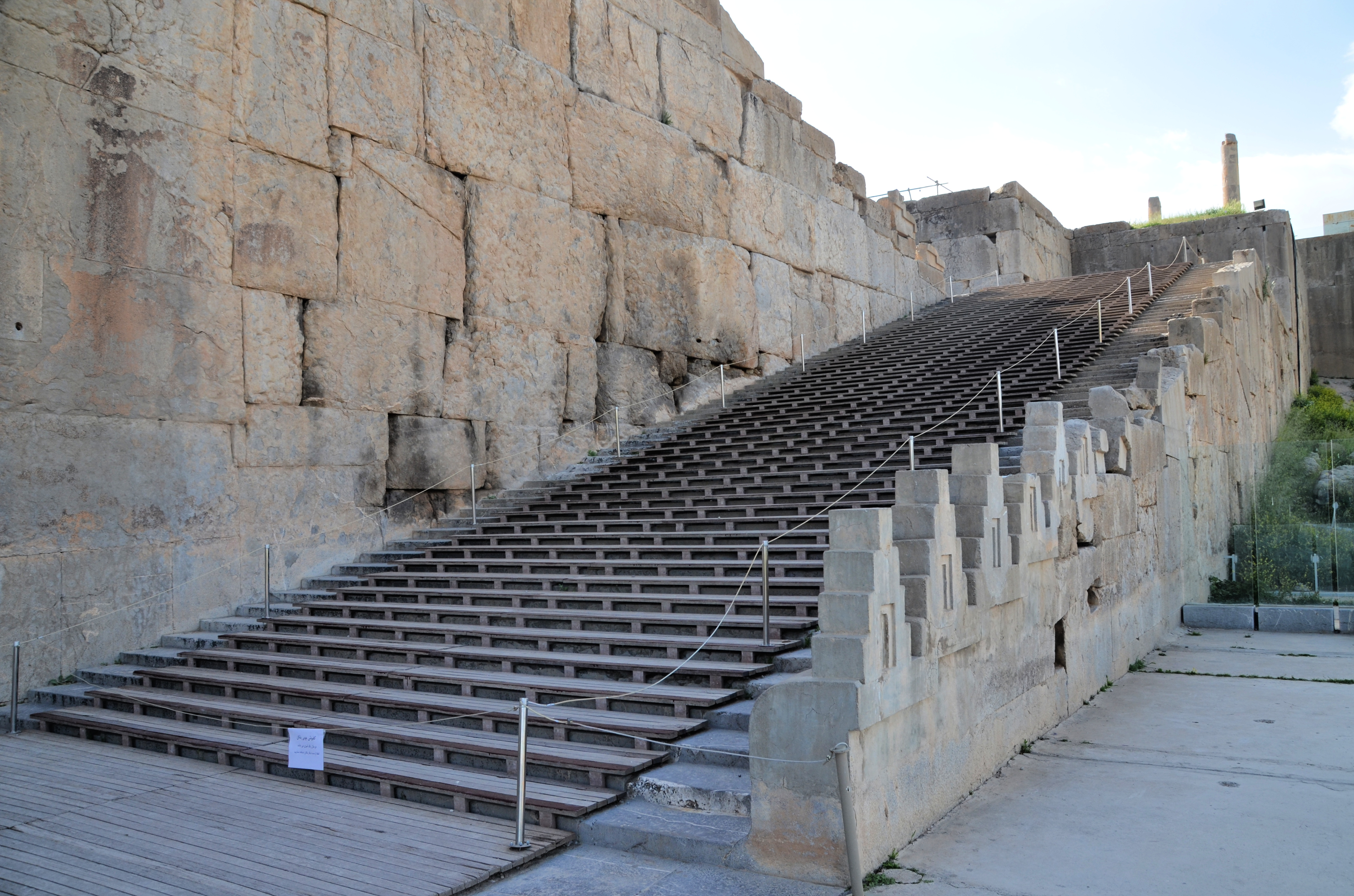
The Great Double Staircase at Persepolis

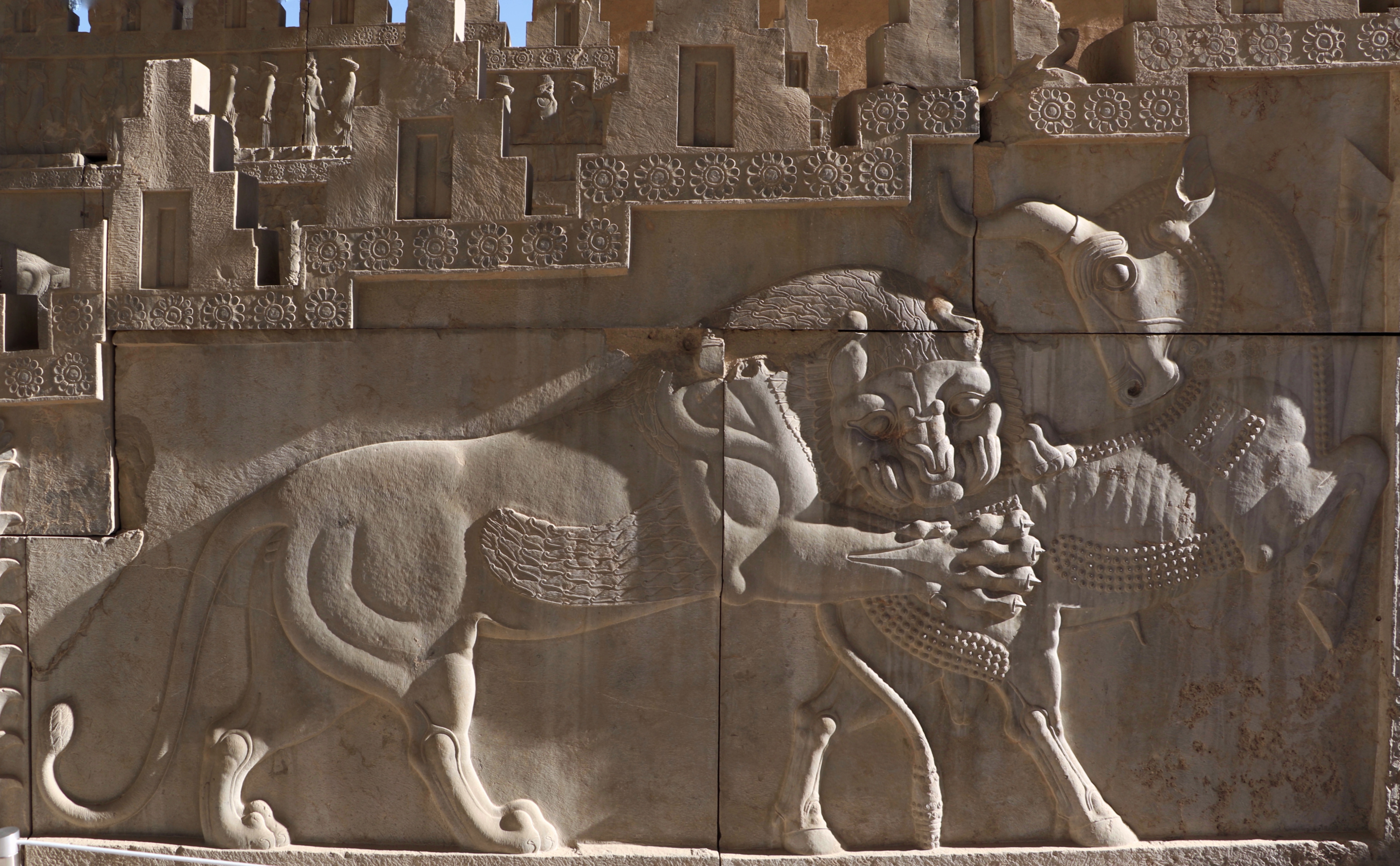
A bas-relief at Persepolis, representing a symbol in Zoroastrianism for Nowruz. (Note: Eternally fighting bull (personifying the moon), and a lion (personifying the sun) representing the spring.)

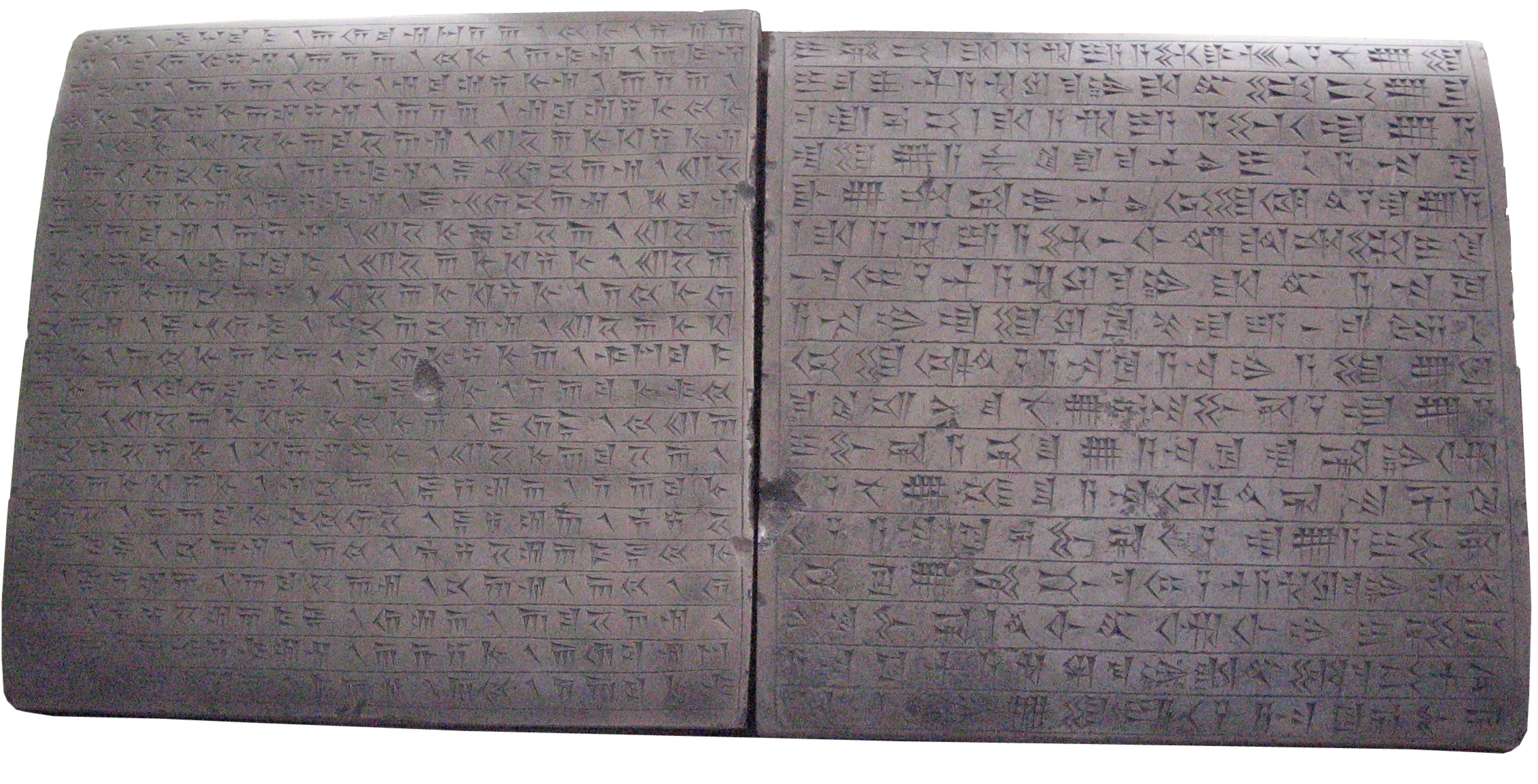
Tablets of Xerxes, kept at the National Museum of Iran

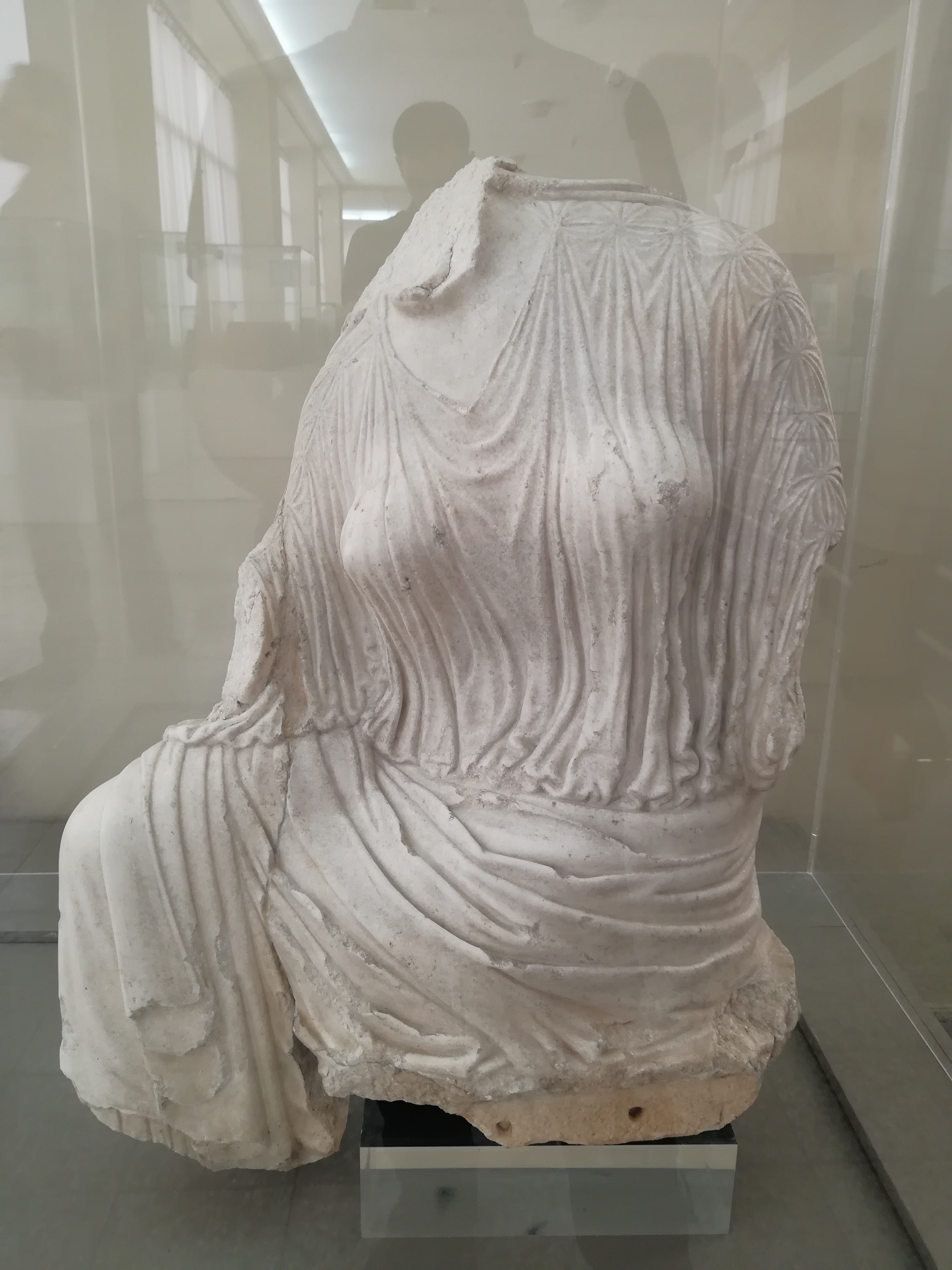
One of the four existing statues of Penelope was discovered at Persepolis, and is kept at the National Museum of Iran

=== The Gate of All Nations ===
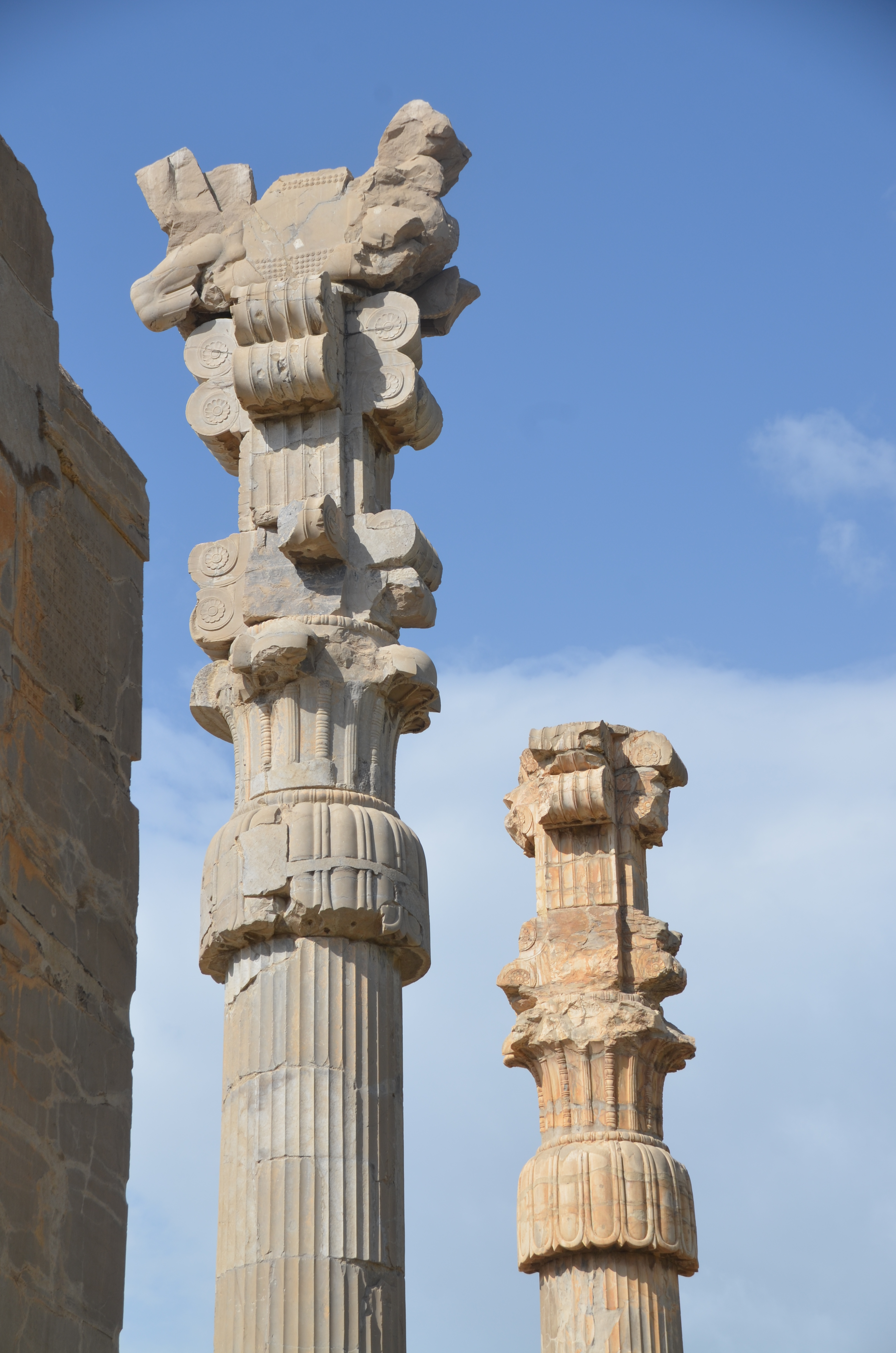
The stone columns of the Gate of All Nations, they are 16½ meters high and were topped with capitals in the form of a double bull.

The Gate of All Nations, referring to subjects of the empire, consisted of a grand hall that was a square of approximately 25 m (82 ft) in length, with four columns and its entrance on the Western Wall.

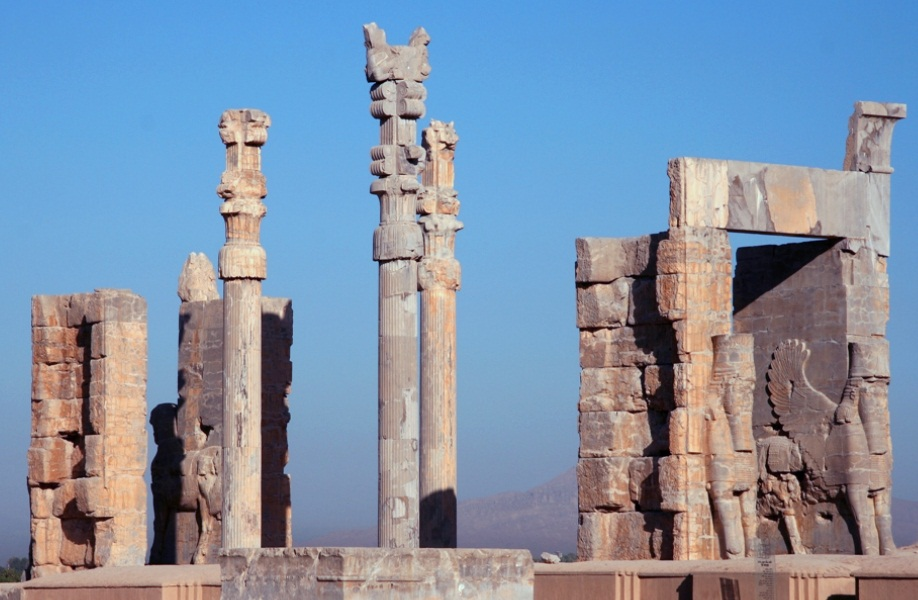
The Gate of All Nations, Persepolis

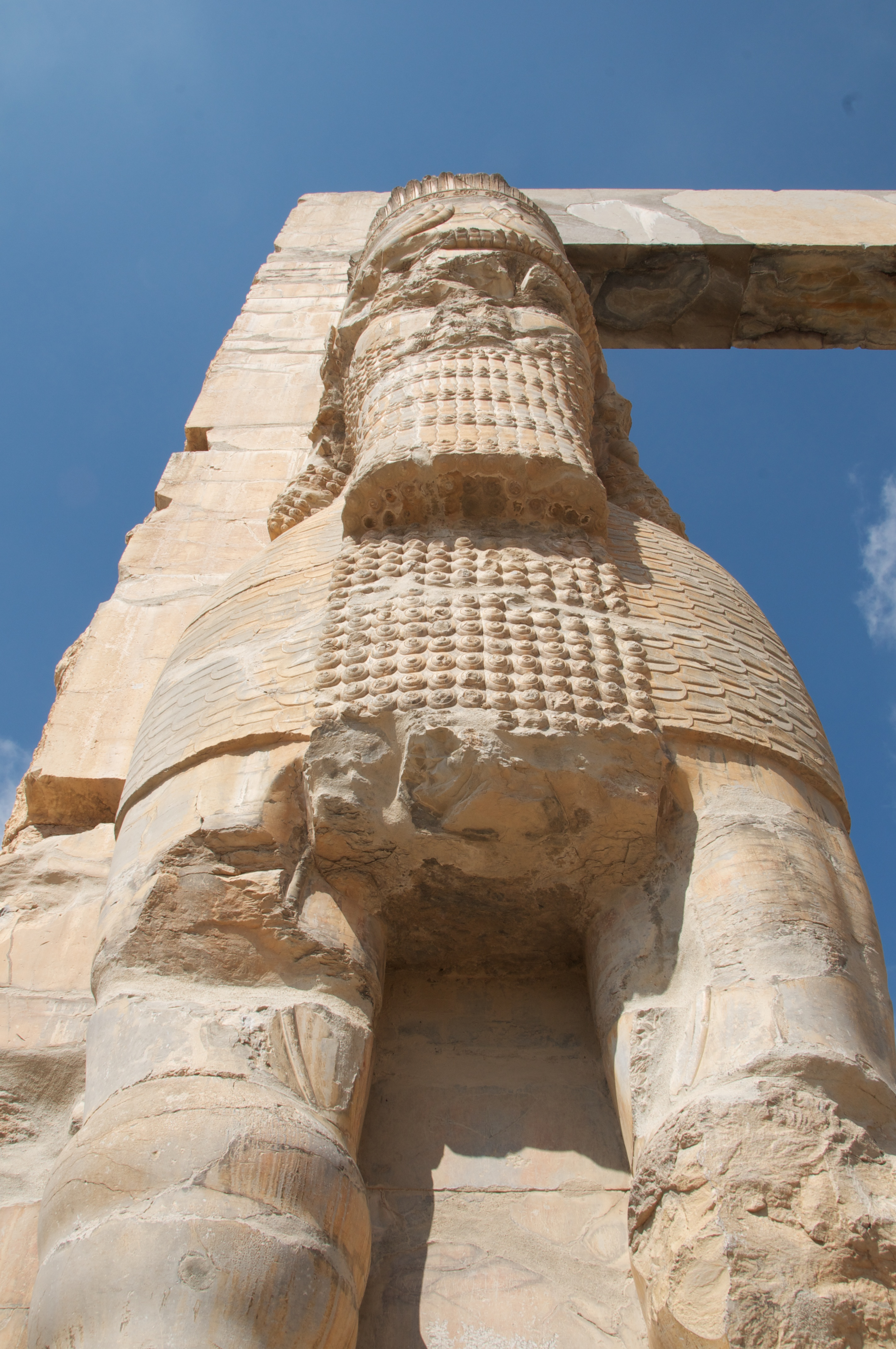
A Lamassu at the Gate of All Nations

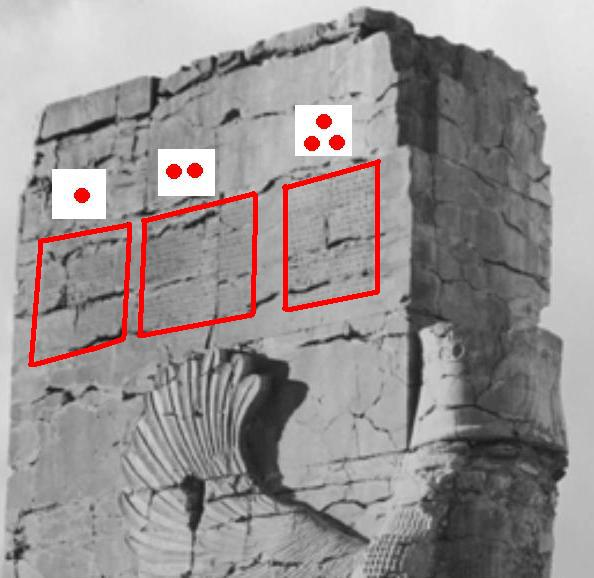
The position of three languages inscriptions on The Gate of All Nations, Persepolis

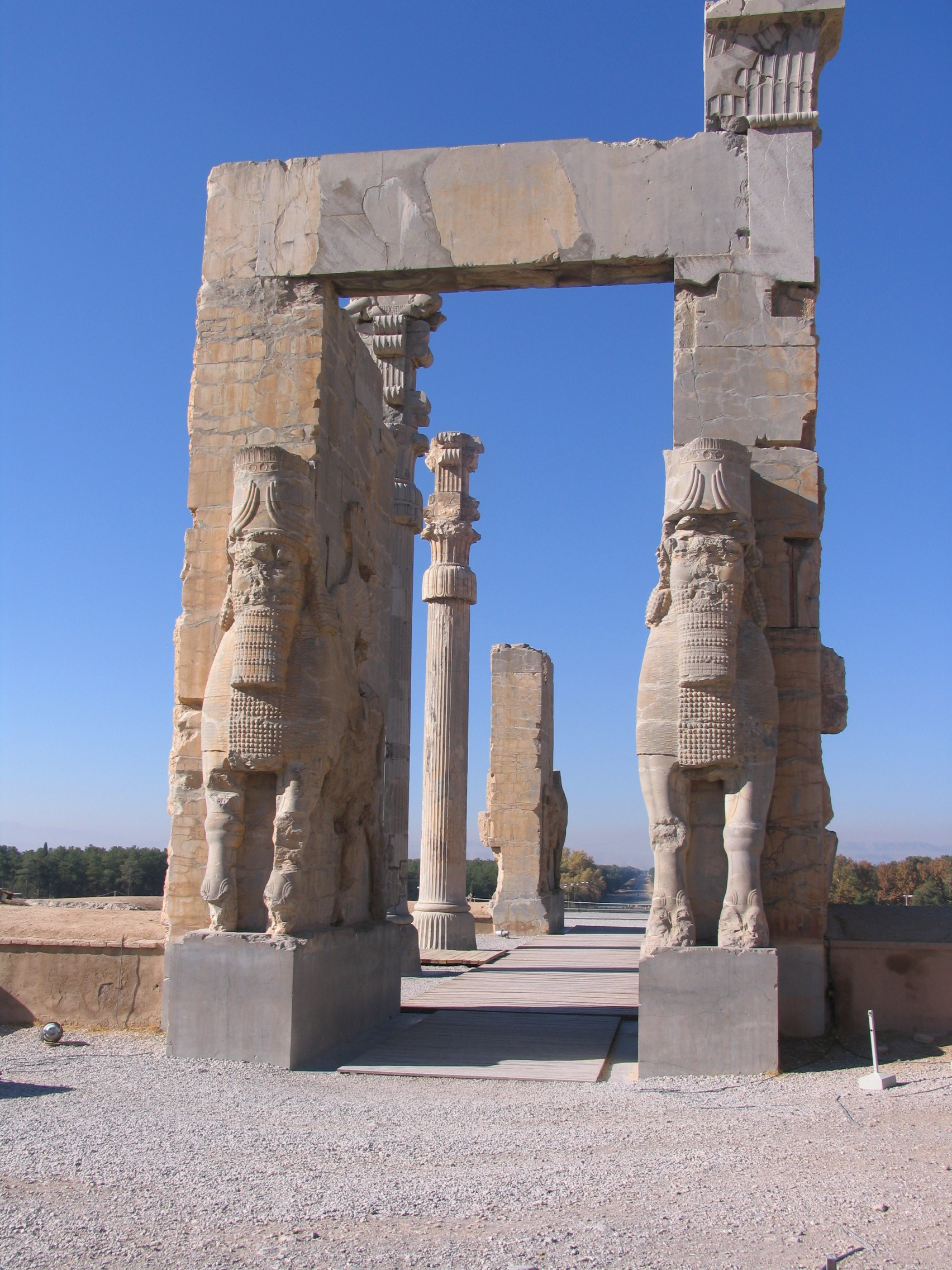
The two Lamassu at the Gate of All Nations.

=== The Apadana Palace ===
Darius I built the greatest palace at Persepolis on the western side of platform. This palace was called the Apadana. The King of Kings used it for official audiences.

Foundation tablets of gold and silver were found in two deposition boxes in the foundations of the Palace. They contained an inscription by Darius in Old Persian cuneiform, which describes the extent of his Empire in broad geographical terms, and is known as the DPh inscription:

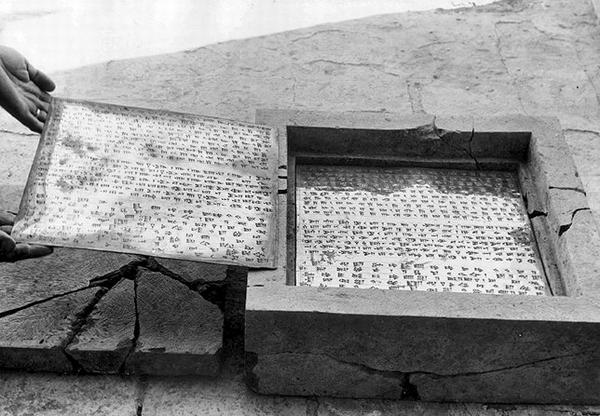
Gold foundation tablets of Darius I for the Apadana Palace, in their original stone box. The Apadana coin hoard had been deposited underneath. c. 510 BC. Both are kept at the National Museum of Iran.

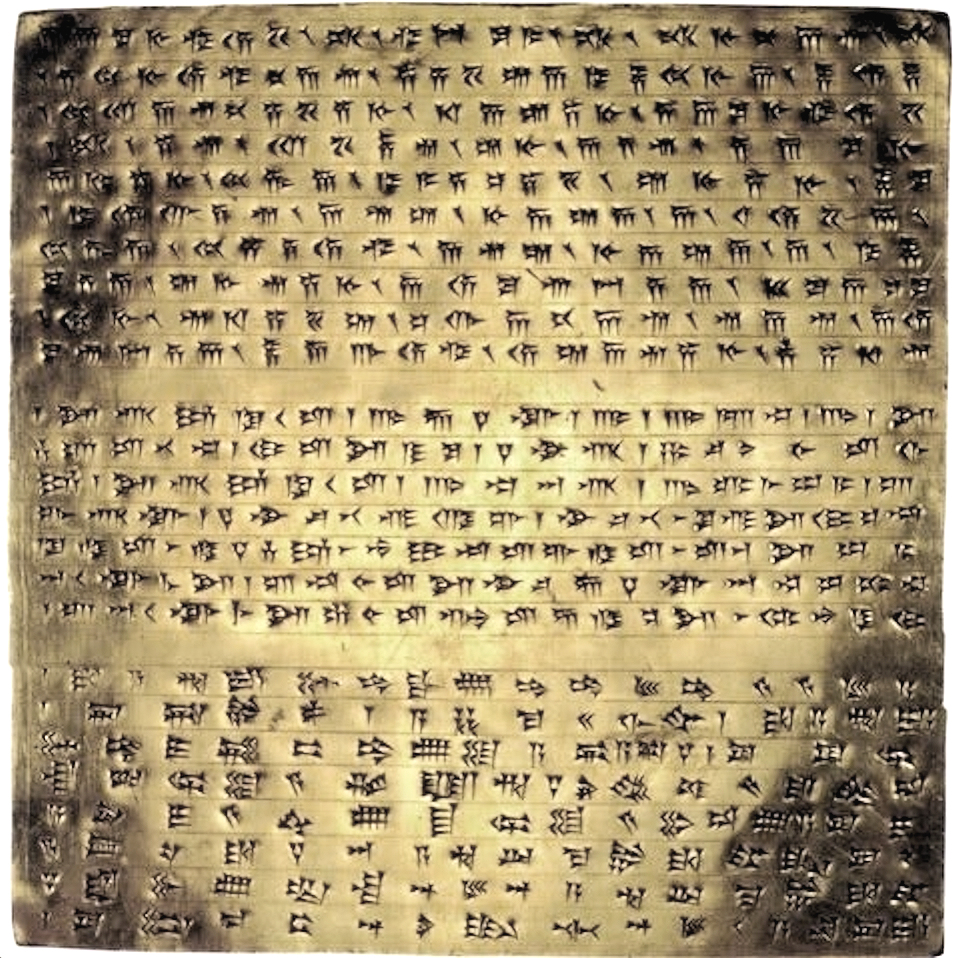
One of the two gold deposition plates. Two more were in silver. They all had the same trilingual inscription (DPh inscription).

Darius the great king, king of kings, king of countries, son of Hystaspes, an Achaemenid. King Darius says: This is the kingdom which I hold, from the Sacae who are beyond Sogdia, to Kush, and from Sind (Old Persian: 𐏃𐎡𐎭𐎢𐎺, romanized: Hidauv, locative of Hiduš, i.e. "Indus valley") to Lydia (Old Persian: Spardâ) – [this is] what Ahuramazda, the greatest of gods, bestowed upon me. May Ahuramazda protect me and my royal house!

— DPh inscription of Darius I in the foundations of the Apadana Palace

The reliefs on the staircases allow one to observe the people from across the empire in their traditional dress, and even the king himself, "down to the smallest detail".

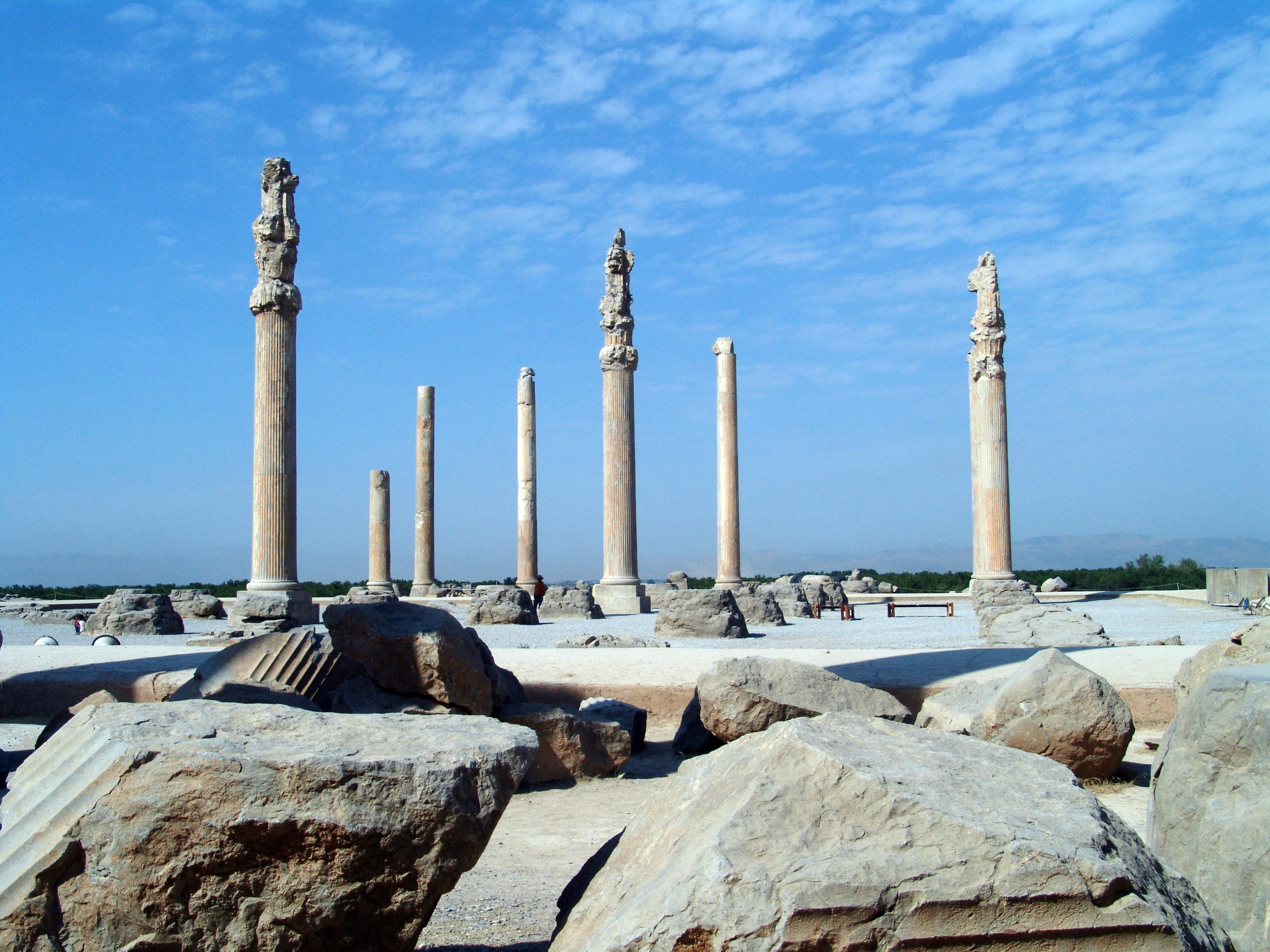
Apadana palace, Persepolis

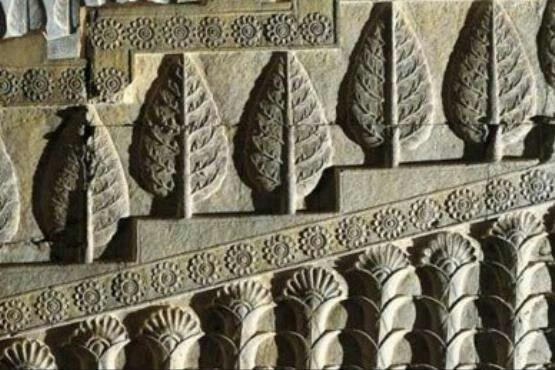
Depiction of trees and Lotus flowers at the Apadana, Persepolis

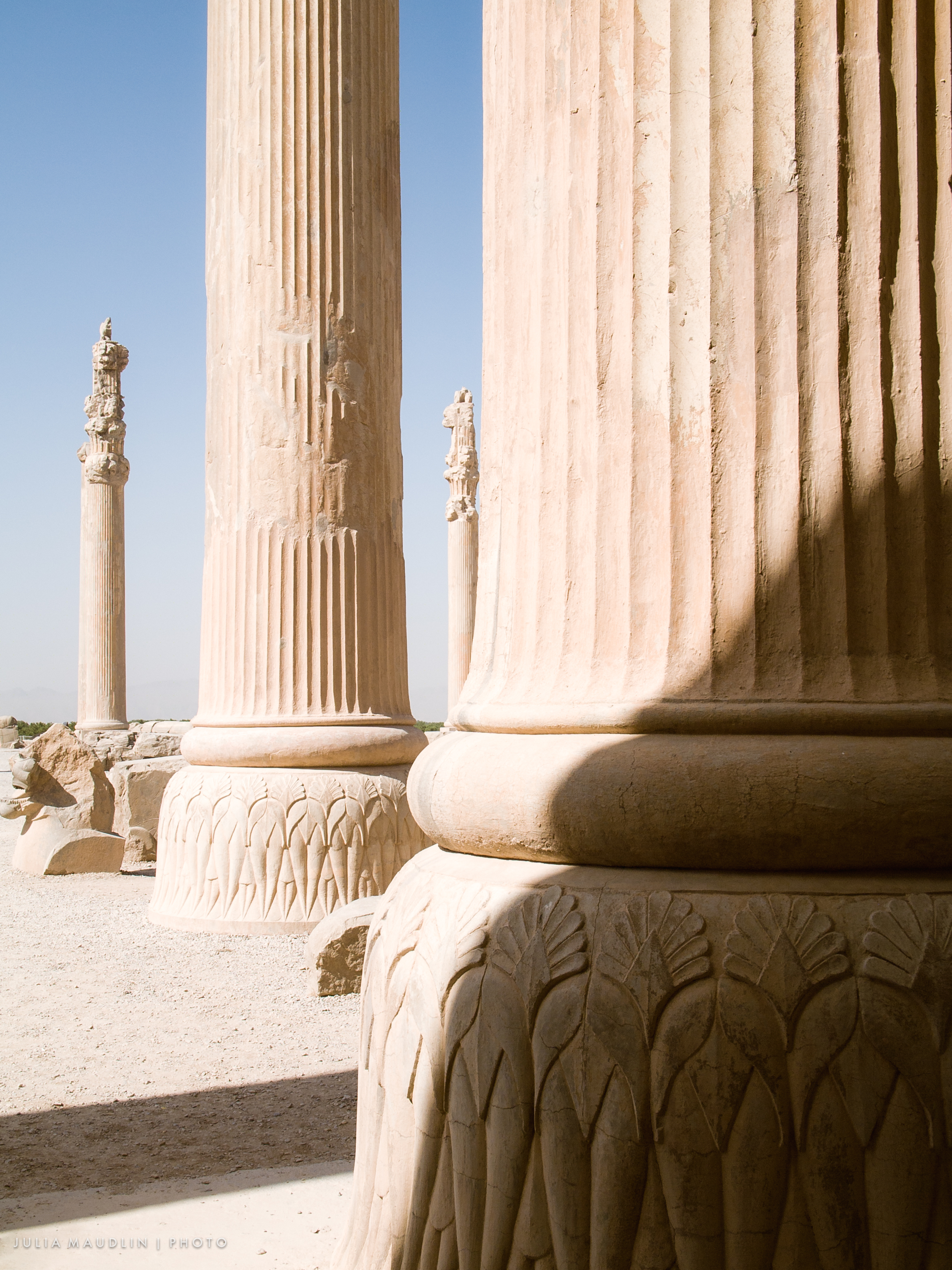
Apadana's columns, Persepolis

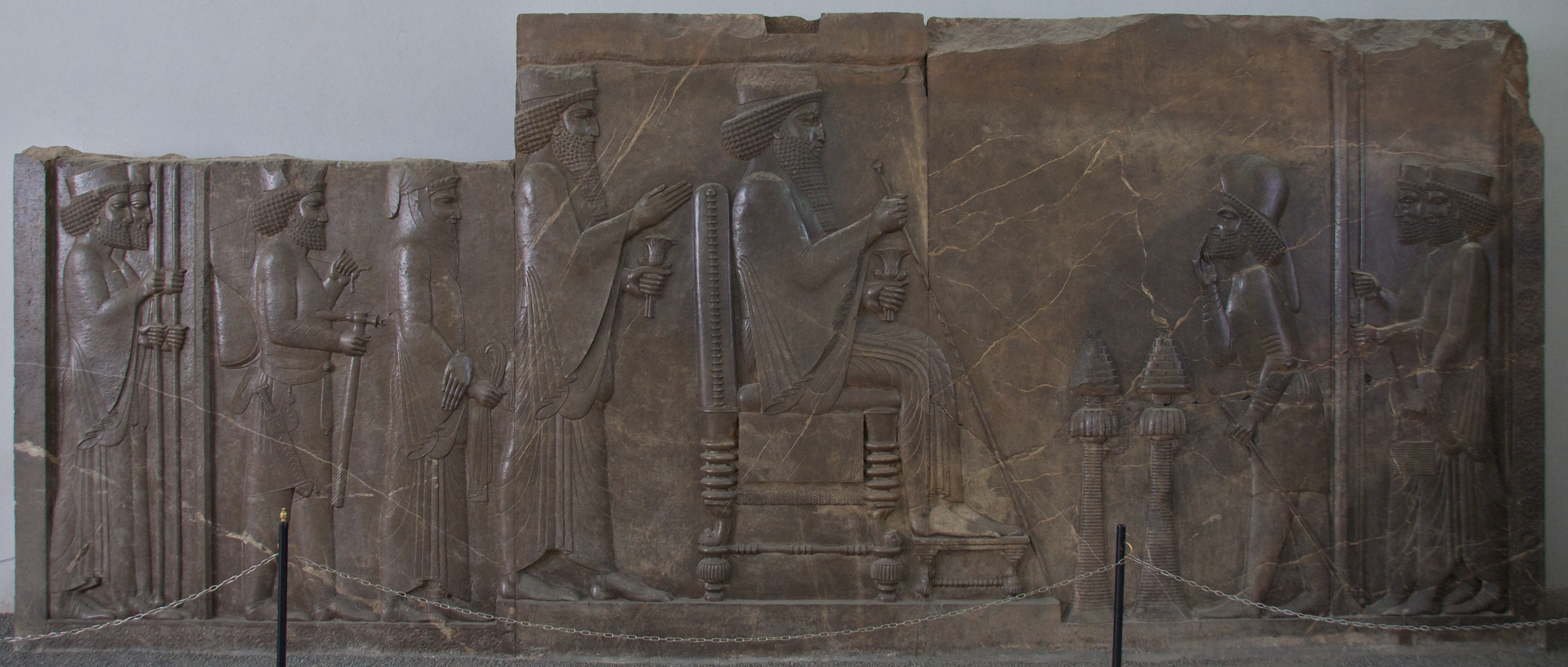
The central wall of the northern stairs of Apadana palace, which shows Xerxes sitting on the throne and receiving an important official. Kept at the National Museum of Iran. Its counterpart remains at Persepolis.

==== Apadana Palace coin hoard ====
Apadana hoard

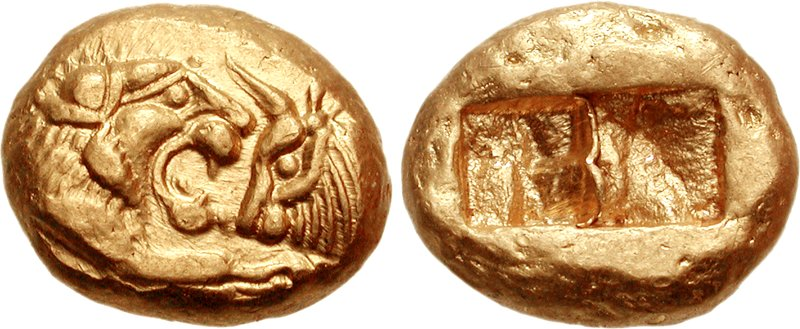
Gold Croeseid minted in the time of Darius, of the type of the eight Croeseids found in the Apadana hoard, c. 545–520 BC. Light series: 8.07 g (0.285 oz), Sardis mint.

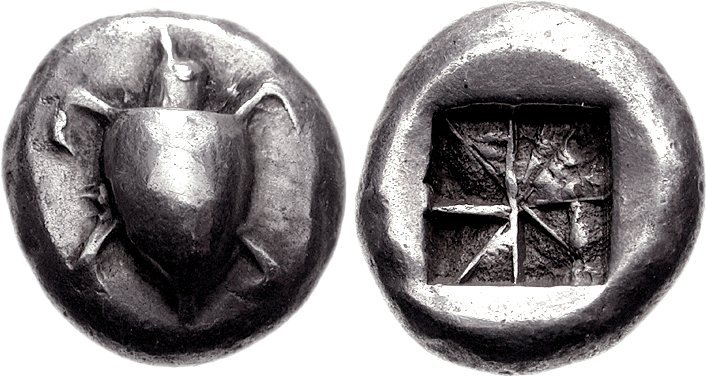
Type of the Aegina stater found in the Apadana hoard, 550–530 BC. Obverse: Sea turtle with large pellets down centre. Reverse: incuse square punch with eight sections.

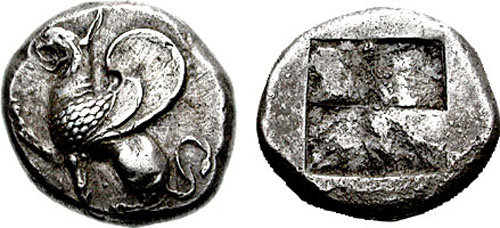
Type of the Abdera coin found in the Apadana hoard, c. 540/35–520/15 BC. Obverse: Griffin seated left, raising paw. Reverse: Quadripartite incuse square.

The Apadana hoard is a hoard of coins that were discovered under the stone boxes containing the foundation tablets of the Apadana Palace in Persepolis. The coins were discovered in excavations in 1933 by Erich Schmidt, in two deposits, each deposit under the two deposition boxes that were found. The deposition of this hoard is dated to c. 515 BC. The coins consisted in eight gold lightweight Croeseids, a tetradrachm of Abdera, a stater of Aegina and three double-sigloi from Cyprus. The Croeseids were found in very fresh condition, confirming that they had been recently minted under Achaemenid rule. The deposit did not have any Darics and Sigloi, which also suggests strongly that these coins typical of Achaemenid coinage only started to be minted later, after the foundation of the Apadana Palace.

=== The Throne Hall ===
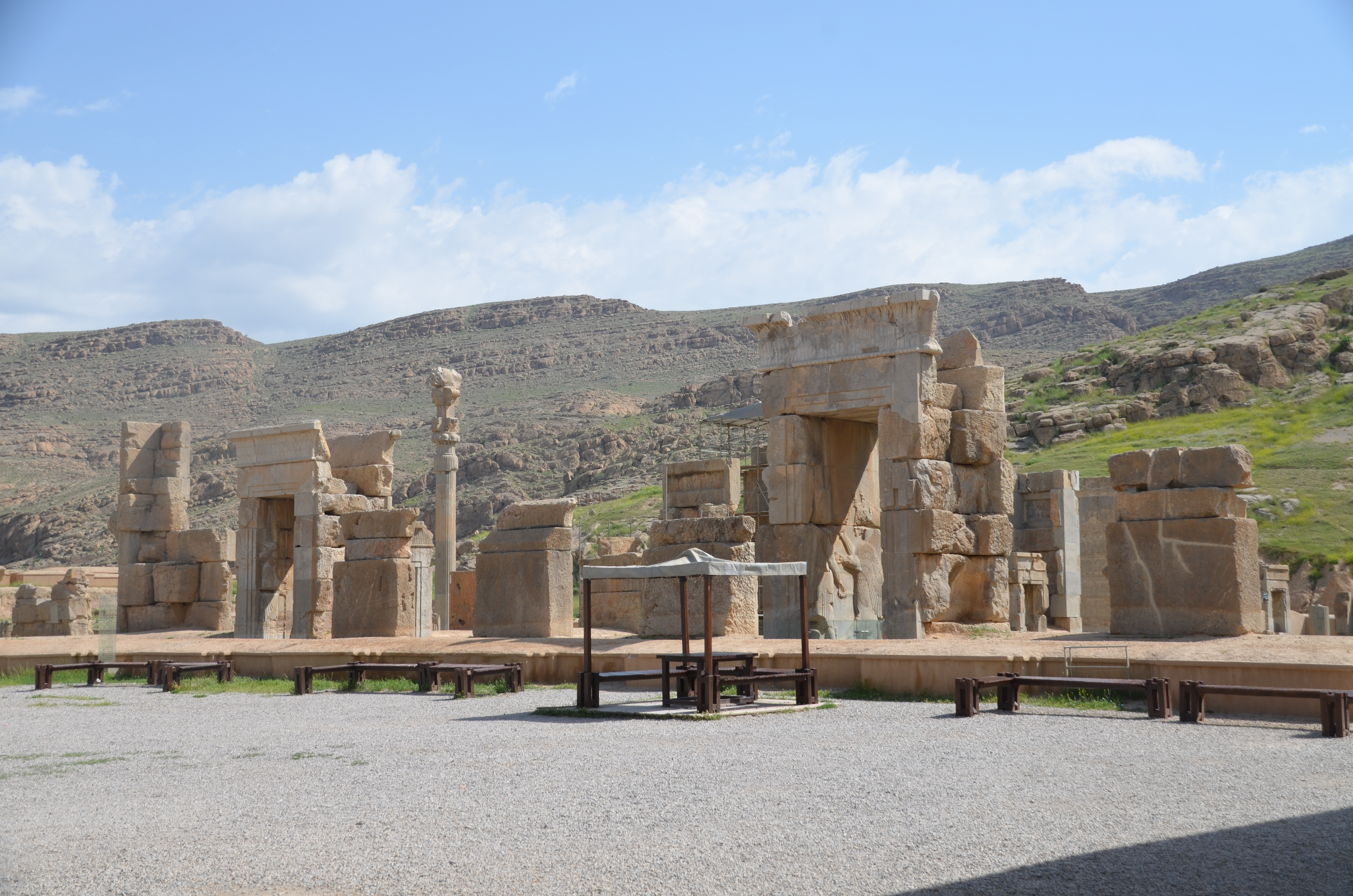
The Throne Hall, Persepolis

Next to the Apadana, second largest building of the Terrace and the final edifices, is the Throne Hall or the Imperial Army's Hall of Honor (also called the Hundred-Columns Palace). This 70 m^{2} × 70 m^{2} (750 sq ft × 750 sq ft) hall was started by Xerxes I and completed by his son Artaxerxes I by the end of the fifth century BC. Its eight stone doorways are decorated on the south and north with reliefs of throne scenes and on the east and west with scenes depicting the king in combat with monsters. Two colossal stone bulls flank the northern portico. The head of one of the bulls now resides in the Oriental Institute in Chicago and a column base from one of the columns in the British Museum.

At the beginning of the reign of Xerxes I, the Throne Hall was used mainly for receptions for military commanders and representatives of all the subject nations of the empire. Later, the Throne Hall served as an imperial museum.

=== The Tachara Palace ===
Tachara, was the exclusive palace of Darius the Great at Persepolis. Only a small portion of the palace was finished under his rule, it was completed after the death of Darius in 486 BC, by his son and successor, Xerxes, who called it a Taçara, which means "winter palace" in Old Persian. It was then used by Artaxerxes I. In the 4th century BC, following his invasion of Iran in 330 BC, Alexander the Great allowed his troops to loot Persepolis. This palace was one of the few structures that escaped destruction in the burning of the complex by Alexander's army, and because of that, Tachara is the most intact building of Persepolis today. It is also the oldest structure at Persepolis. Tachara stands back to back to the Apadana, and is oriented southward.

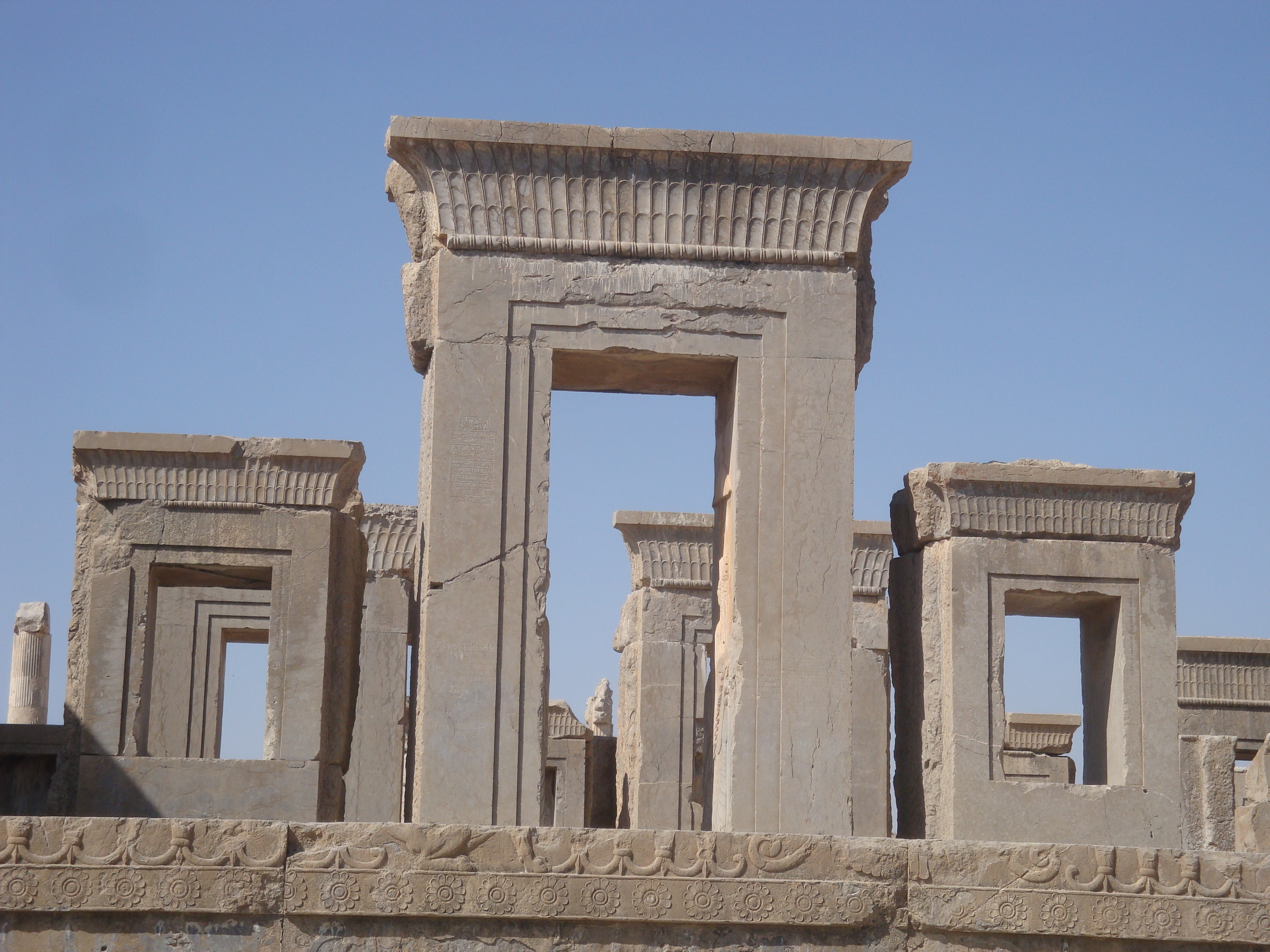
Tachara is the most intact building of Persepolis today.

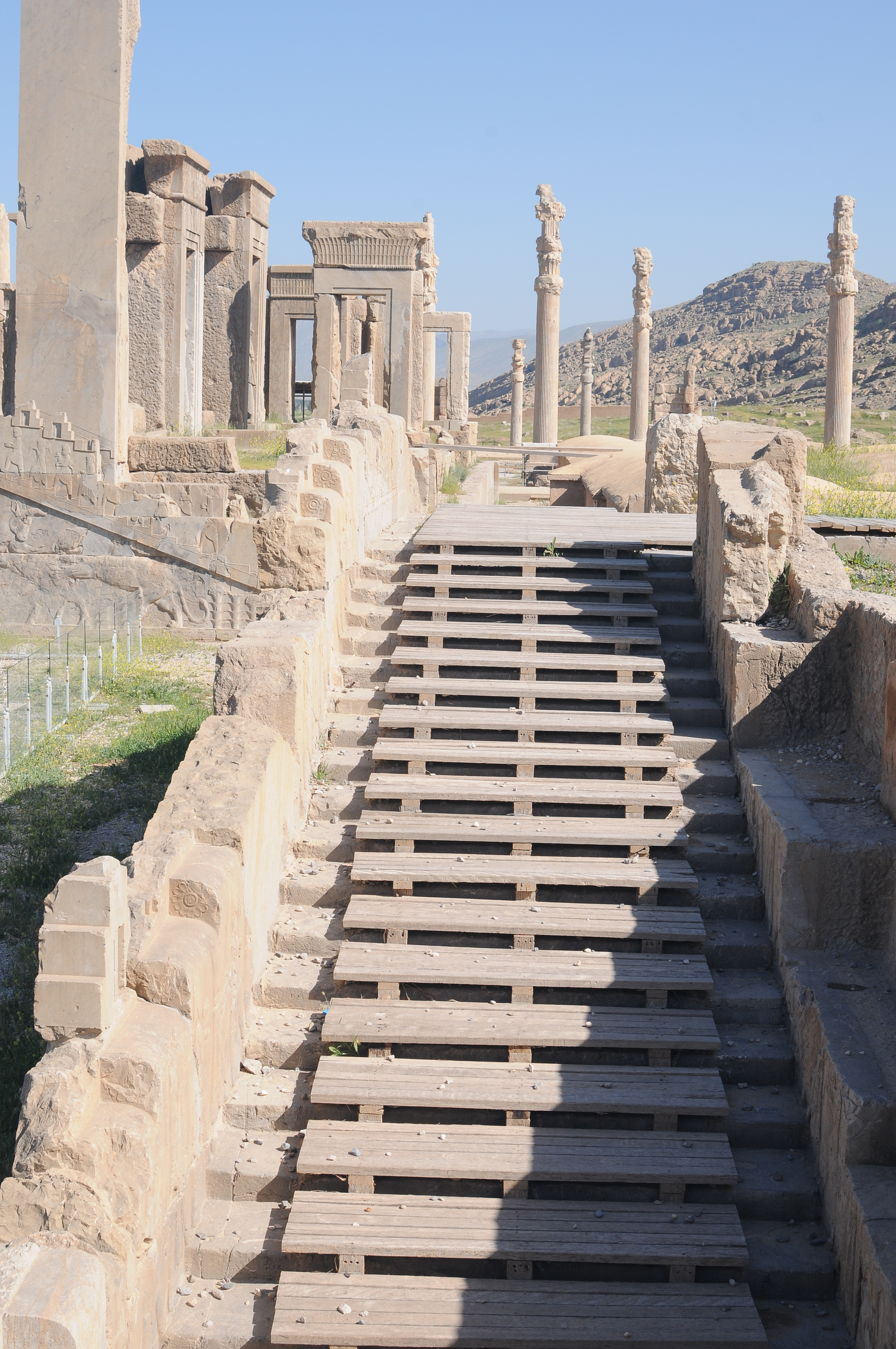
The staircase of Tachara palace at Persepolis

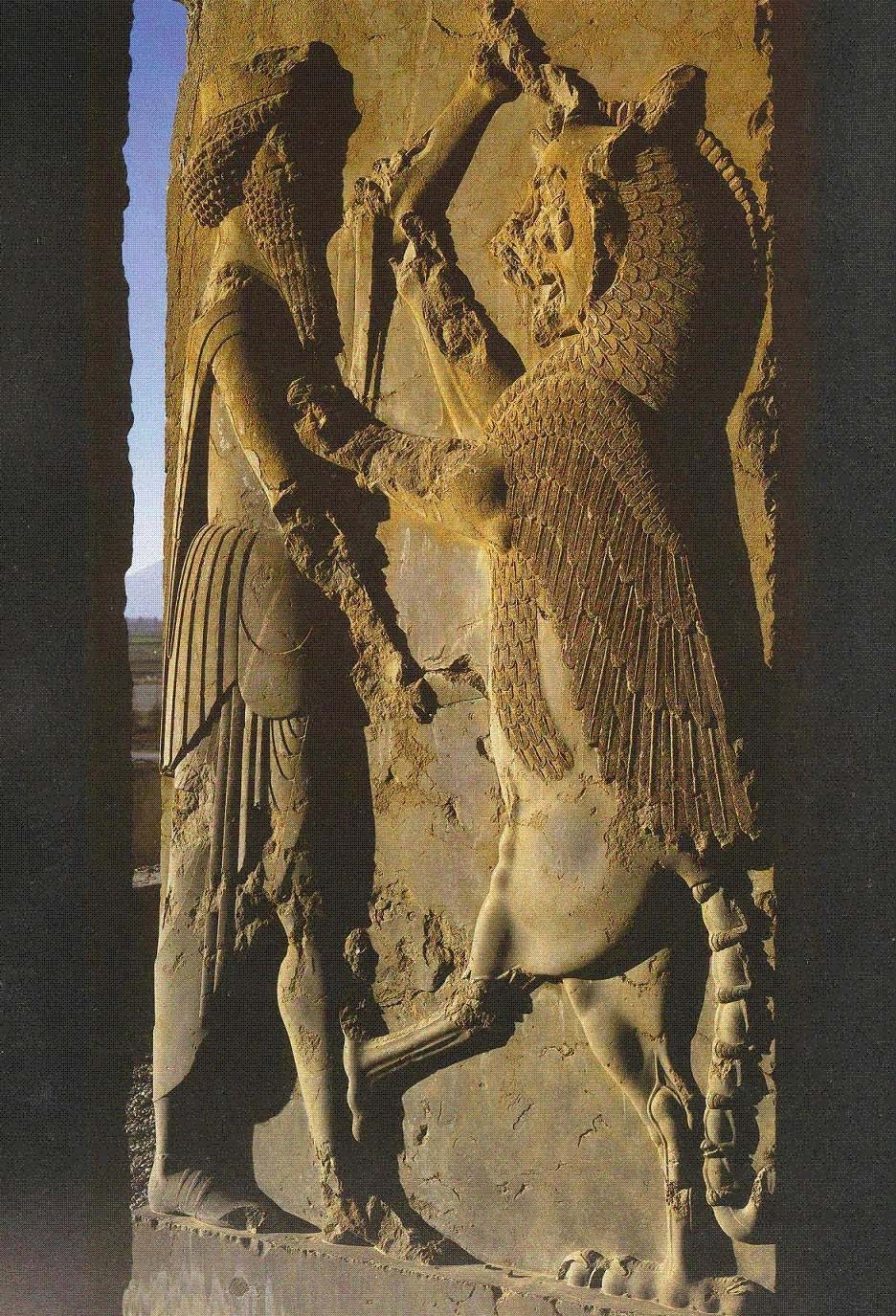
The relief of king's battle with devil at Tachara palace, Persepolis

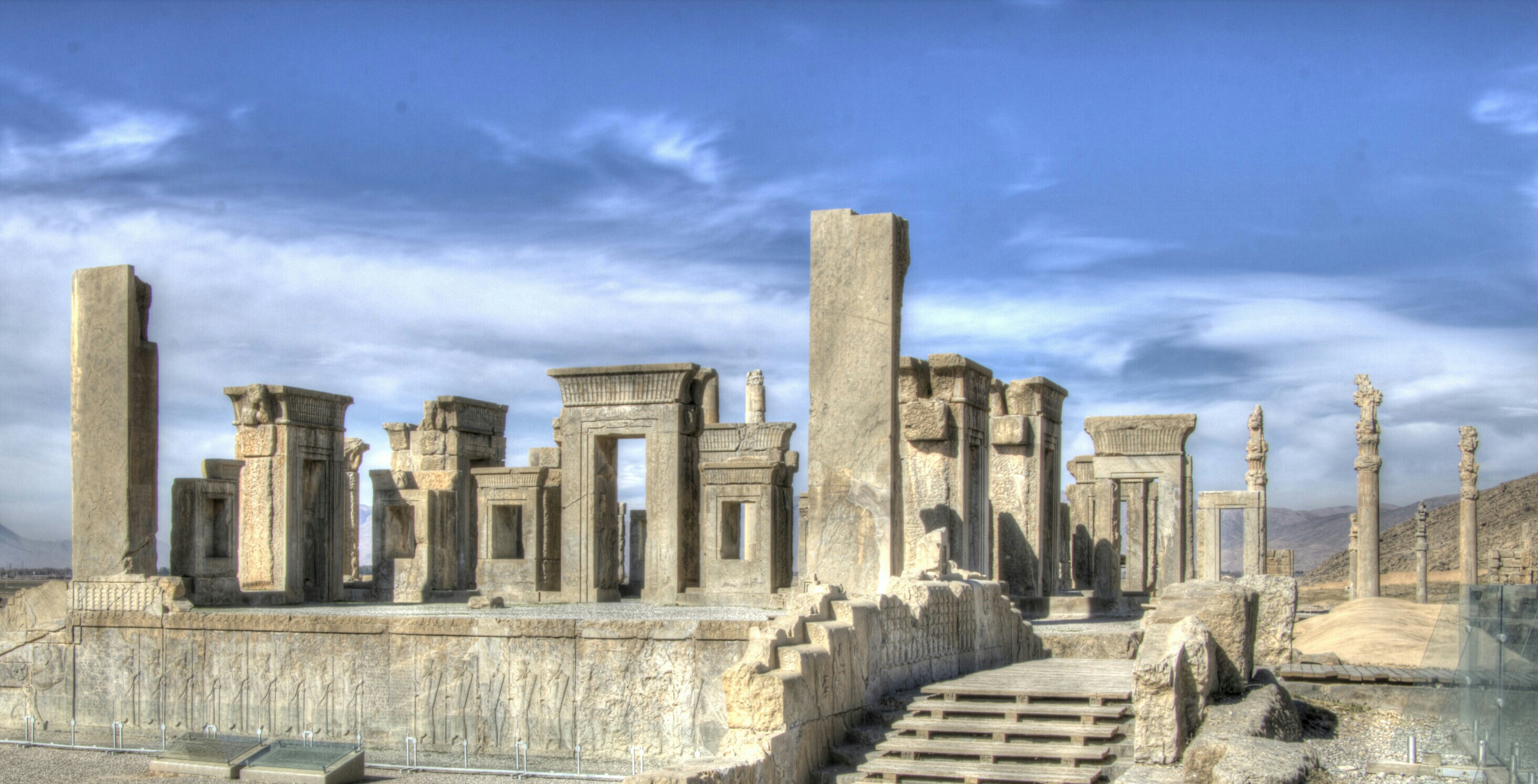
Tachara Palace, Persepolis

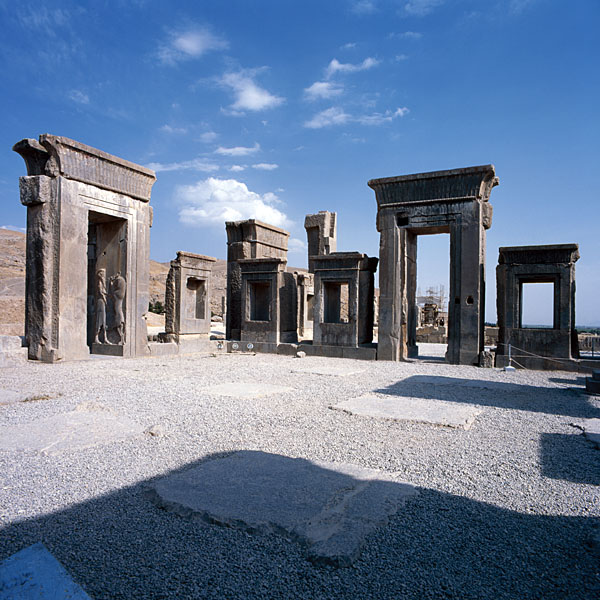
On the structure of Tachara palace

=== The Hadish Palace ===
The Hadish Palace of Xerxes is one of palaces at Persepolis. It's located on the east of the Palace of H (Artaxerxes I). The palace occupies the highest level of terrace and stands on the living rock. The inscriptions of the palace attest that the building was built by order of Xerxes. It covers an area of 2550 square meters (40*55 meters). A double staircase on the west leads to courtyard of the Tachara chateau and another staircase on the northeast connects to courtyard of the Council Hall.

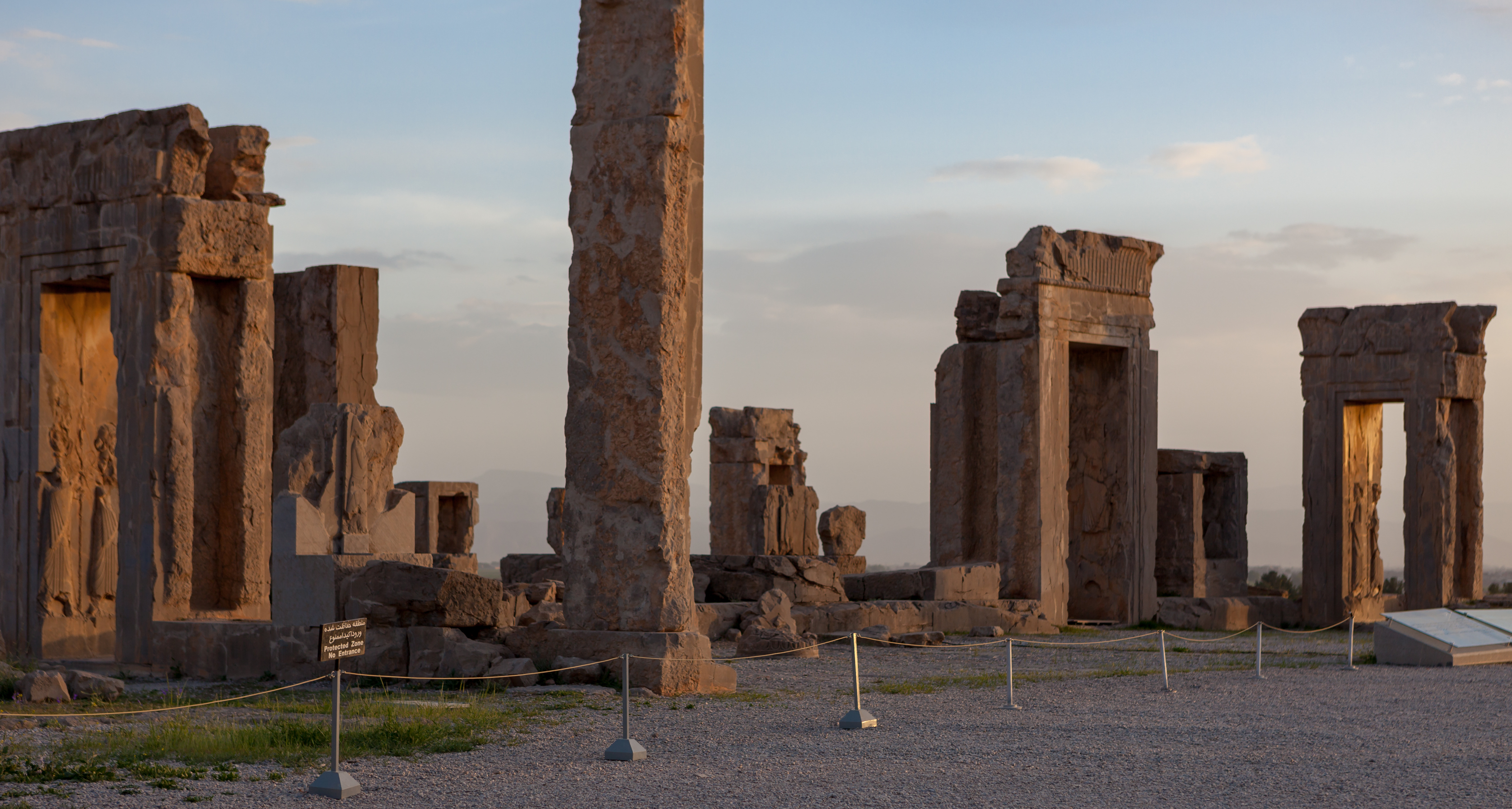
The Hadish palace, Persepolis

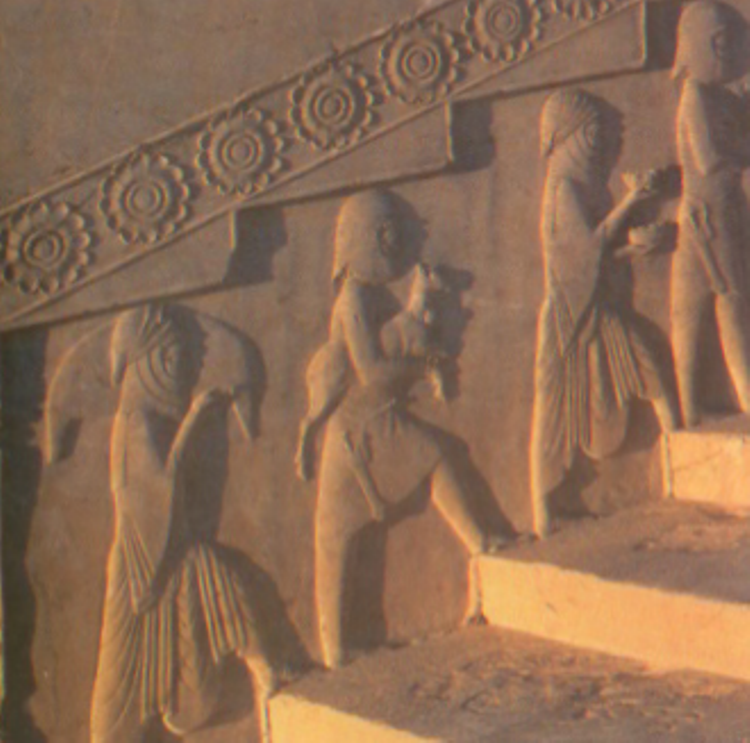
Lotus on the walls of Hadish palace, Persepolis

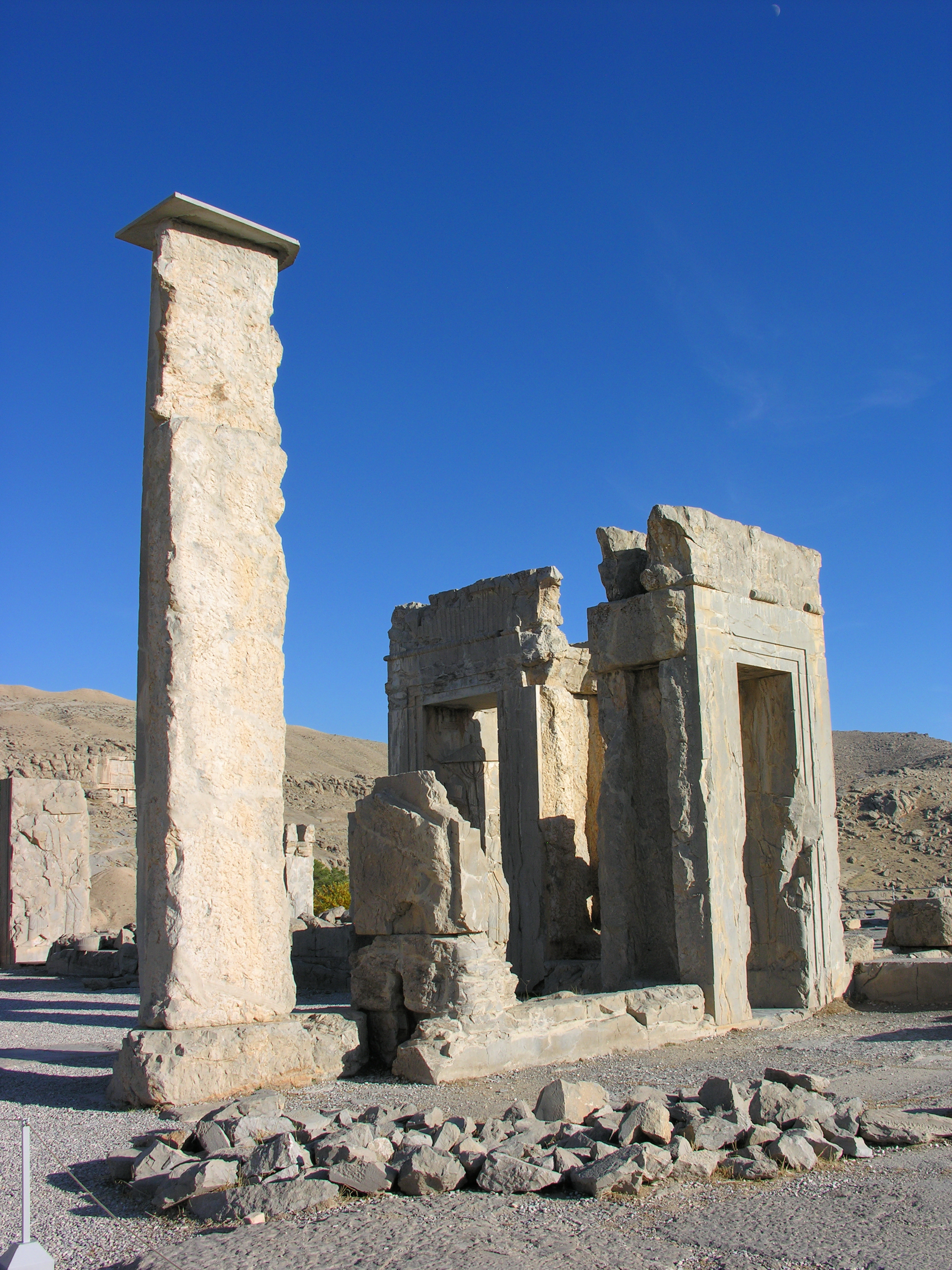
Hadish palace was built by the order of Xerxes

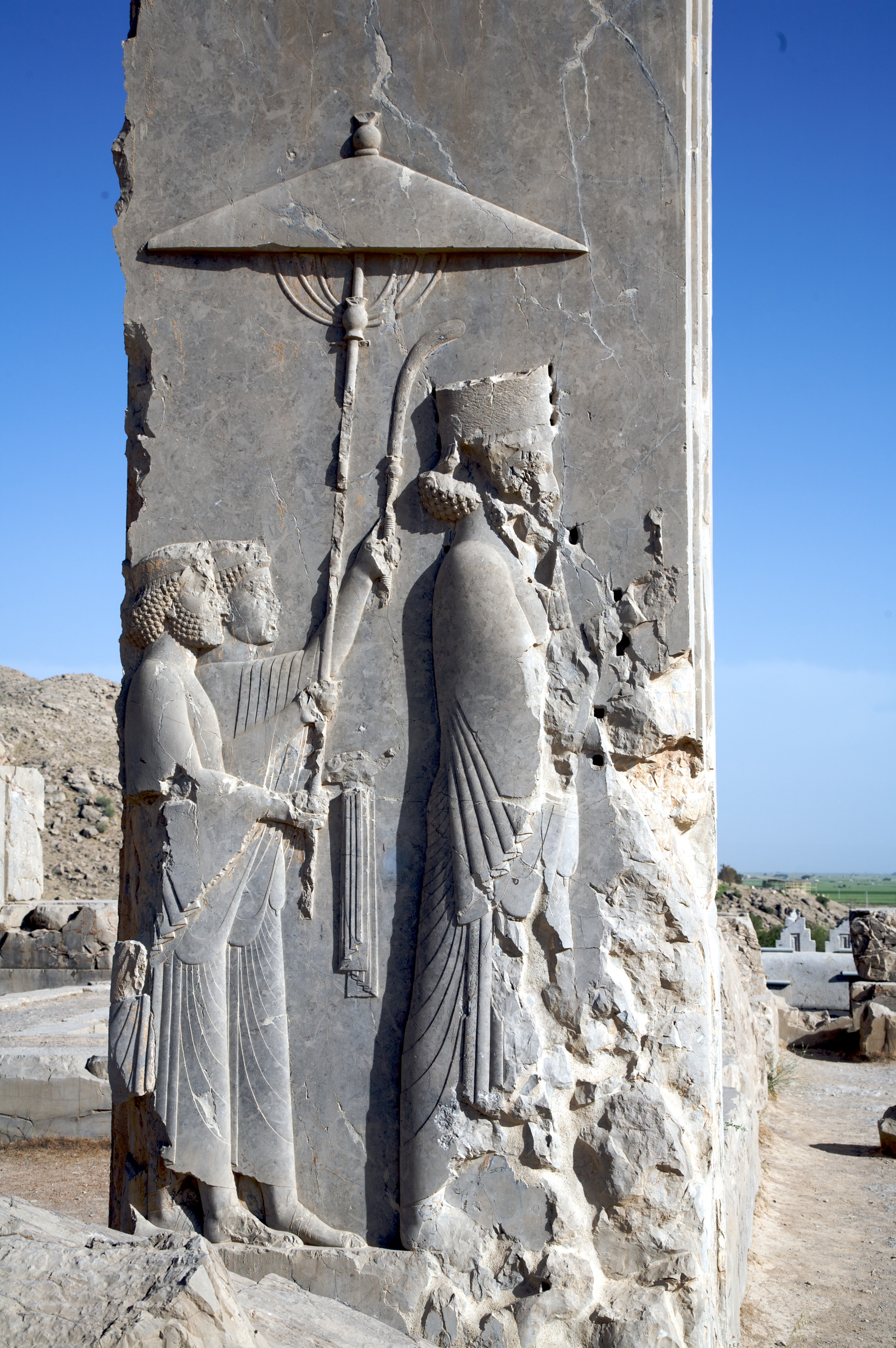
Xerxes at the Hadish palace

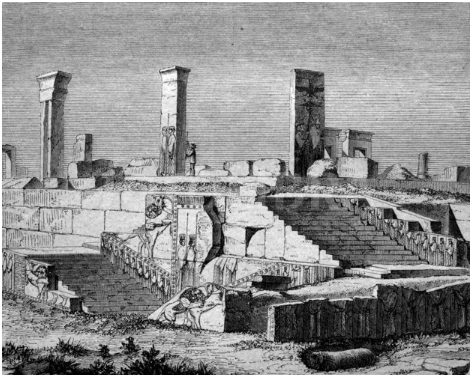
Hadish Palace at Persepolis, 1886

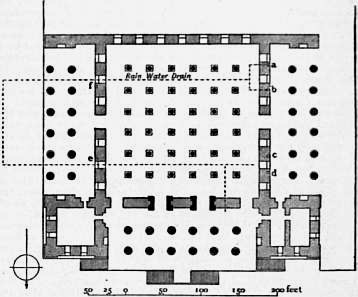
The hall of Hadish palace.

=== Other palaces and structures ===
The Council Hall, the Tryplion Hall, the Palaces of D, G, H, storerooms, stables and quarters, the unfinished gateway and a few miscellaneous structures at Persepolis are located near the south-east corner of the terrace, at the foot of the mountain.

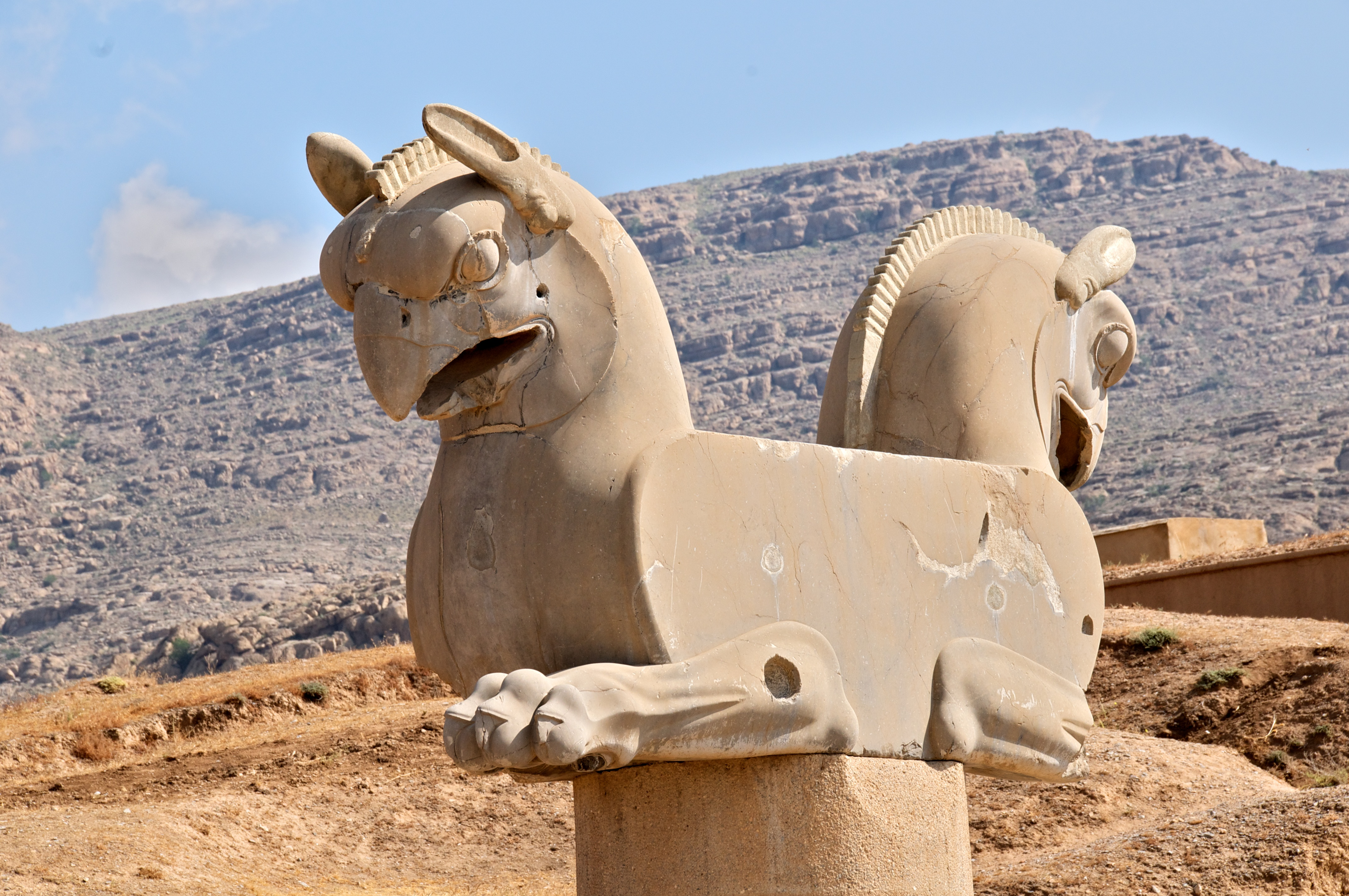
Huma bird at Persepolis

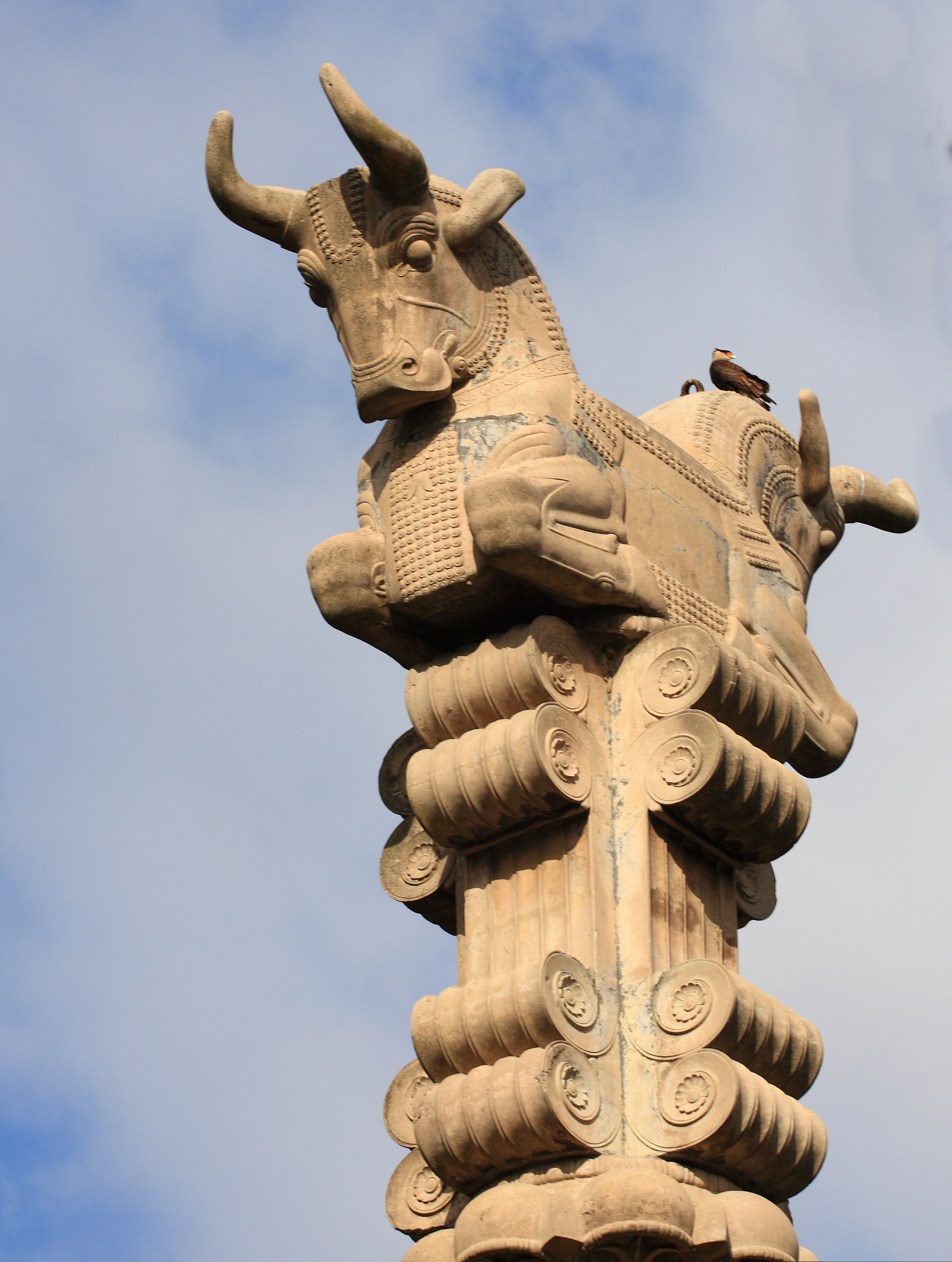
A well-preserved column at Persepolis

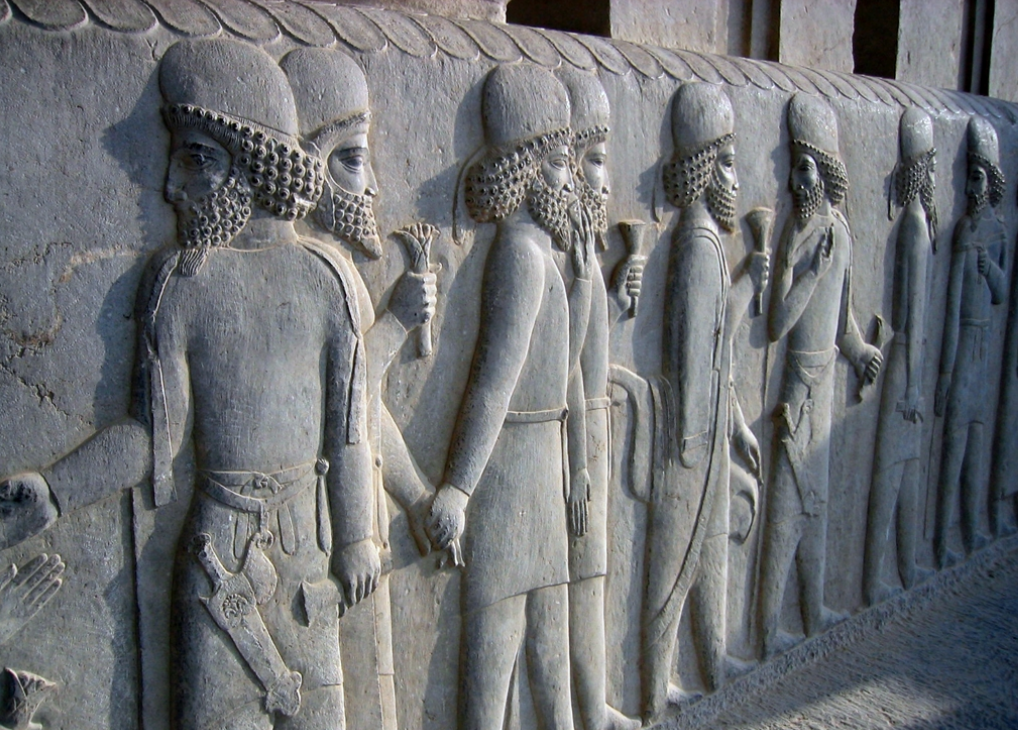
Reliefs from the Council Hall, Persepolis

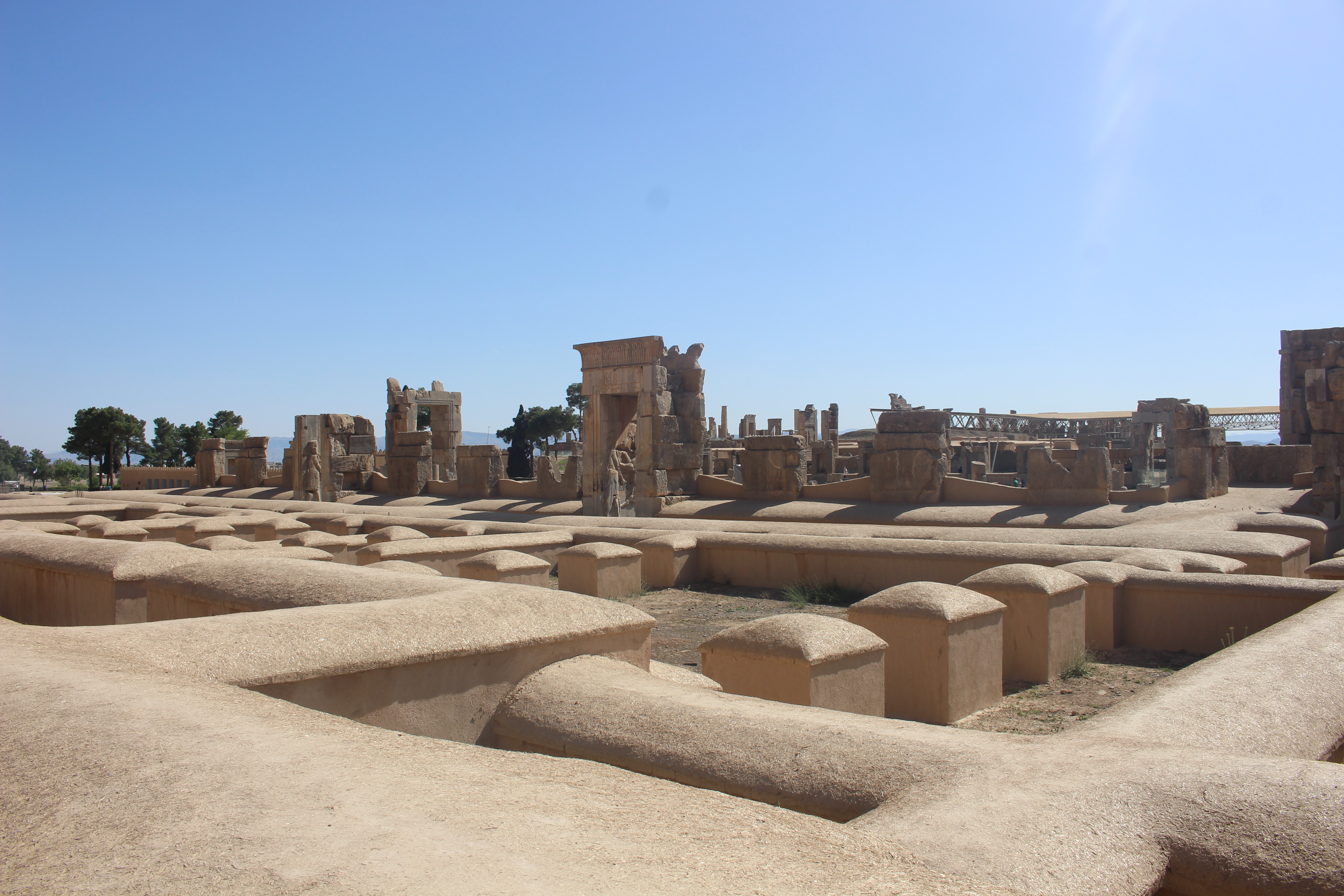
Part of the treasury, Persepolis

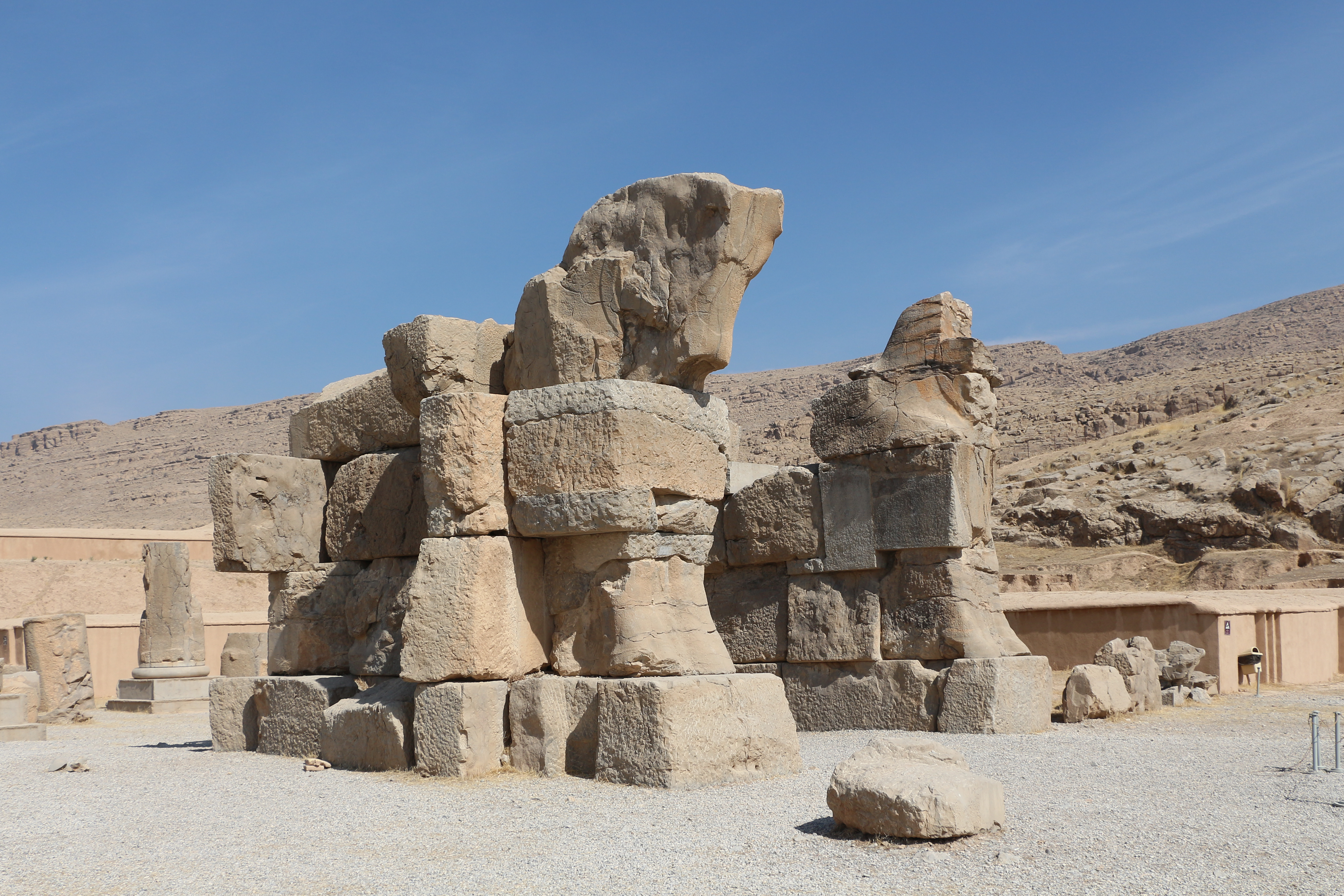
The unfinished gate of Persepolis, started by the order of Artaxerxes III, continued by his successors Arses and Darius III.

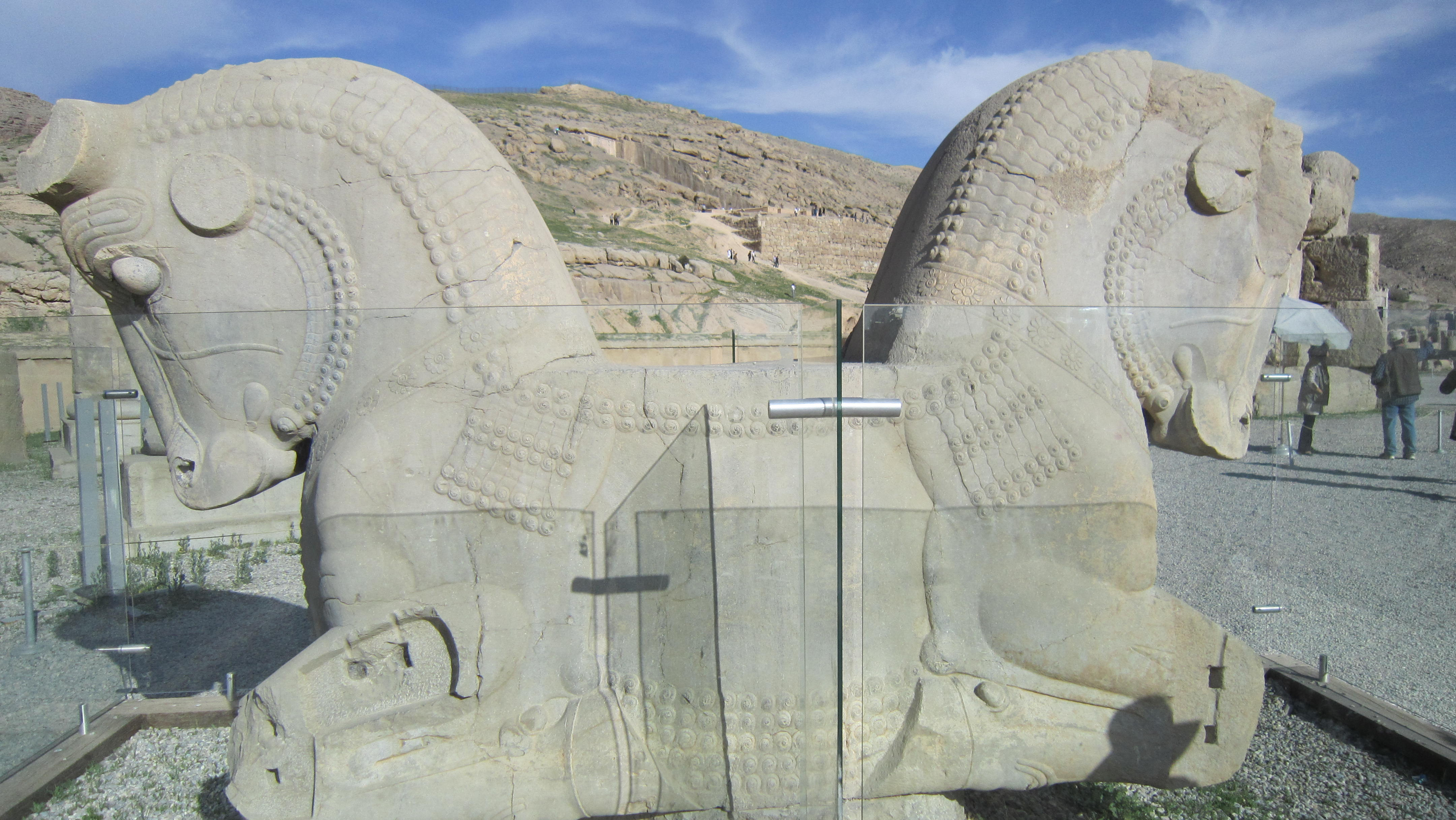
A column head.

=== Tombs ===
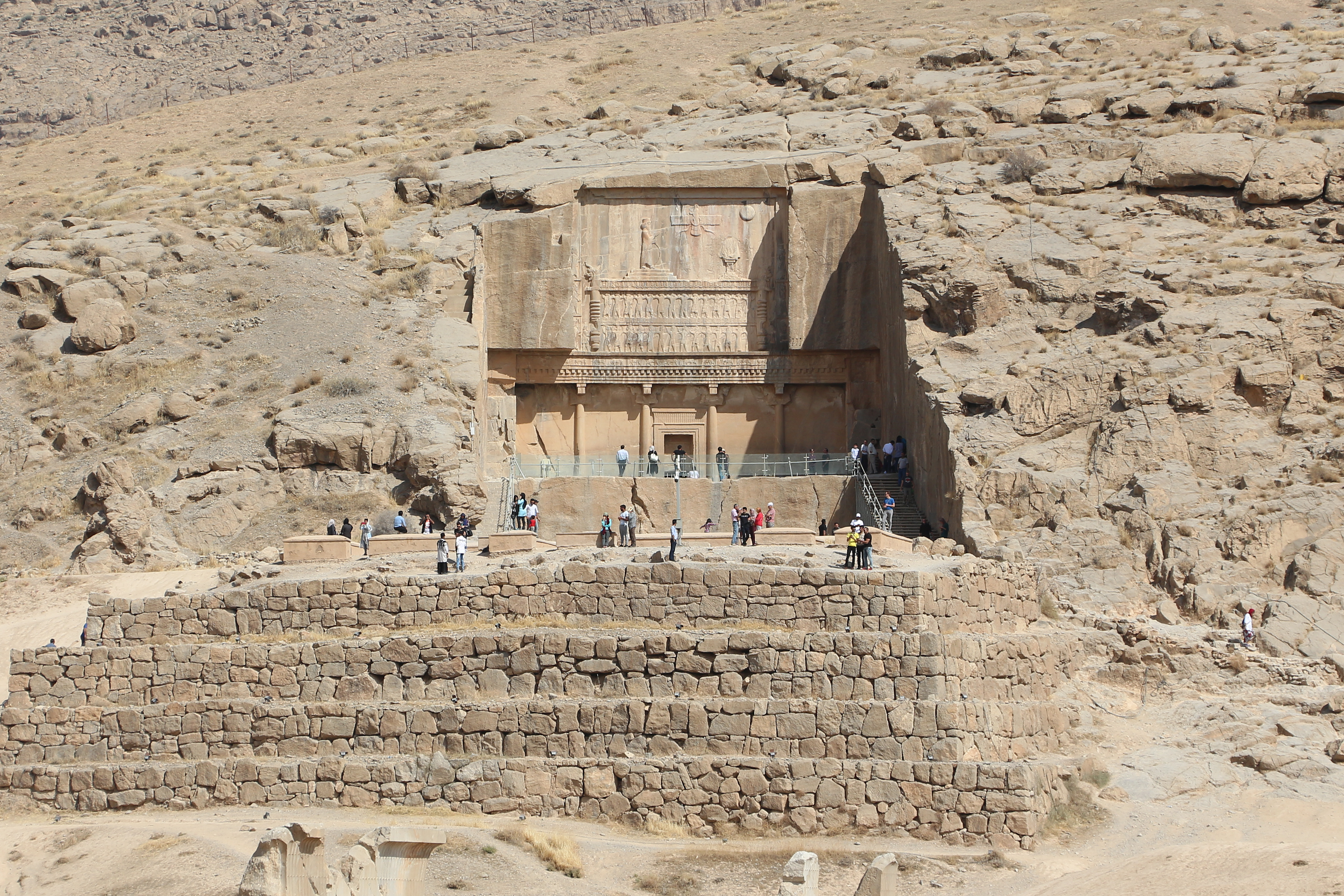
Tomb of Artaxerxes III, Persepolis

It is commonly accepted that Cyrus the Great was buried in the Tomb of Cyrus in Pasargadae, which is mentioned by Ctesias as his own city. If it is true that the body of Cambyses II was brought home "to the Persians," his burying place must be somewhere beside that of his father. Ctesias assumes that it was the custom for a king to prepare his own tomb during his lifetime. Hence, the kings buried at Naghsh-e Rostam are probably Darius I, Xerxes I, Artaxerxes I and Darius II. Xerxes II, who reigned for a very short time, could scarcely have obtained so splendid a monument, and still less could the usurper Sogdianus. The two completed graves behind the compound at Persepolis would then belong to Artaxerxes II and Artaxerxes III. The unfinished tomb, a kilometer away from the city, is debated to whom it belongs.

=== Ancient Texts ===
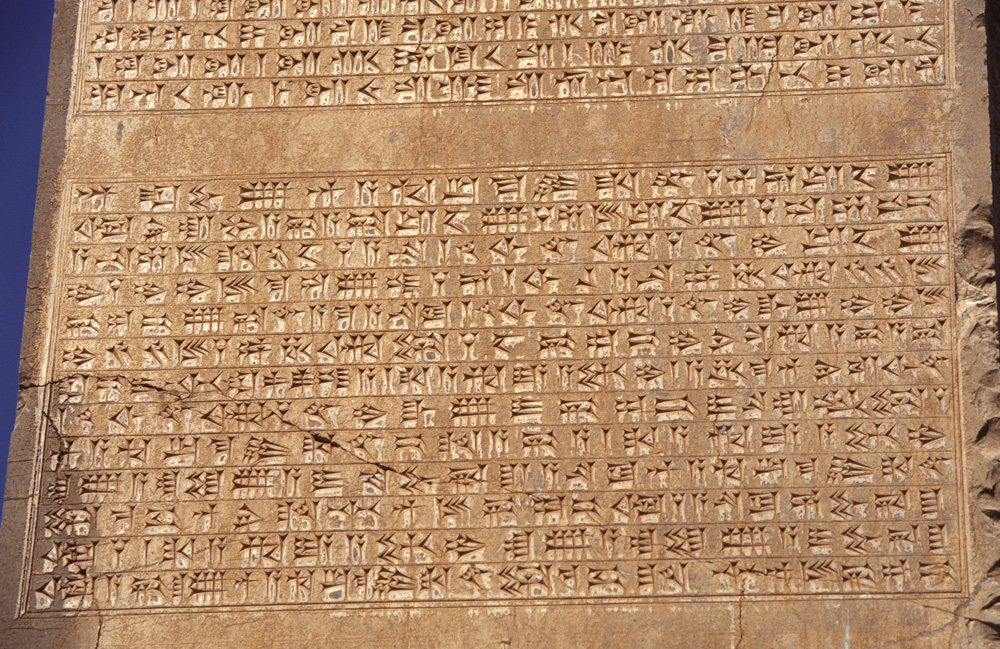
Babylonian version of an inscription of Xerxes I, the "XPc inscription" (Note: Known as XPc (Xerxes Persepolis c), from the portico of the Tachara.)

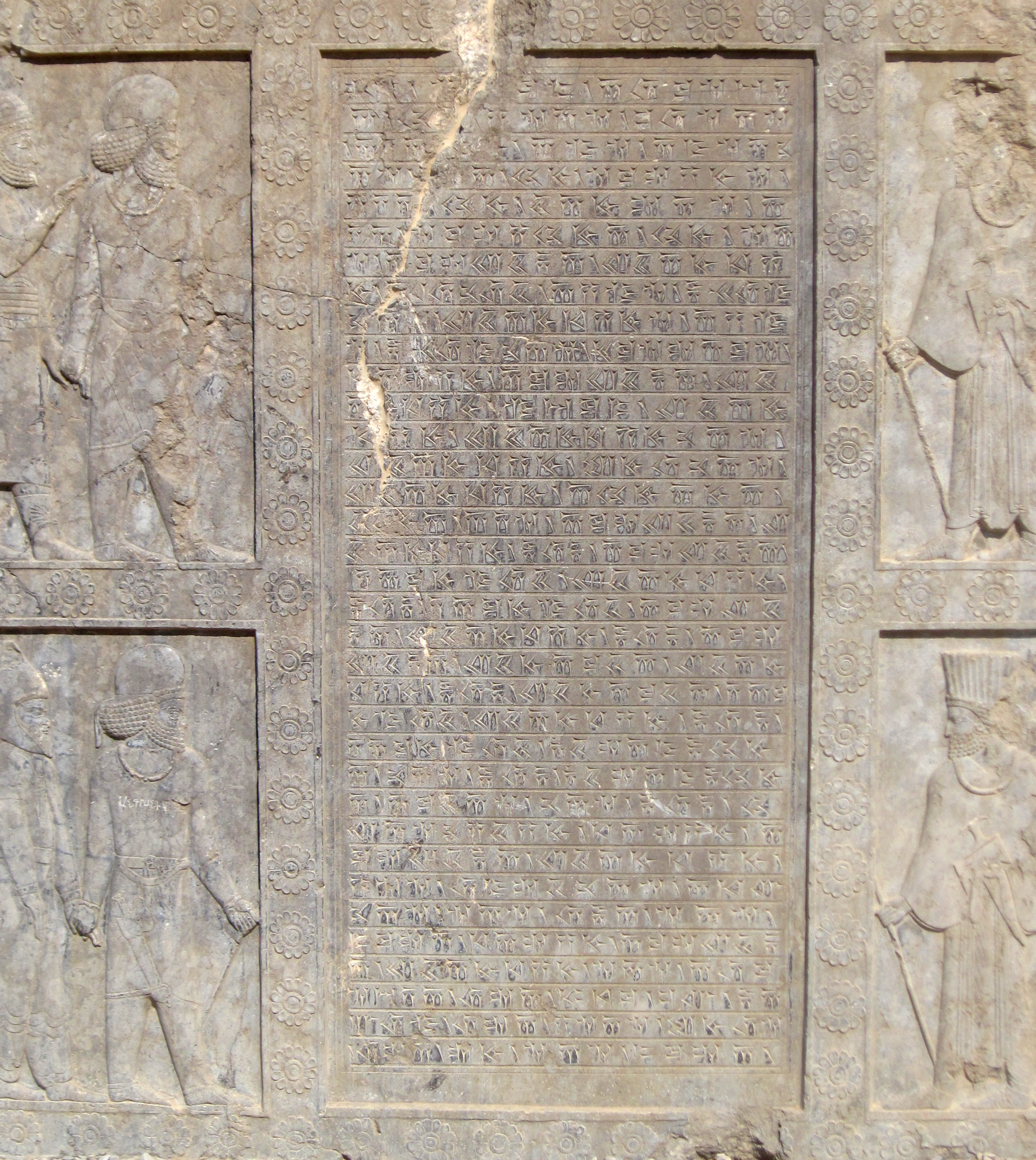
The inscription of Artaxerxes III at Tachar palace, Persepolis.

There are a total of 11 existing inscriptions at Persepolis, related to Darius the Great, Xerxes, Artaxerxes II and Artaxerxes III. The relevant passages from ancient scholars on the subject are set out below:

Persepolis was the capital of the Persian kingdom. Alexander described it to the Macedonians as the most hateful of the cities of Asia, and gave it over to his soldiers to plunder, all but the palaces. (2) It was the richest city under the sun, and the private houses had been furnished with every sort of wealth over the years. The Macedonians raced into it, slaughtering all the men whom they met and plundering the residences; many of the houses belonged to the common people and were abundantly supplied with furniture and wearing apparel of every kind...

72 (1) Alexander held games in honor of his victories. He performed costly sacrifices to the gods and entertained his friends bountifully. While they were feasting and the drinking was far advanced, as they began to be drunken, a madness took possession of the minds of the intoxicated guests. (2) At this point, one of the women present, Thais by name and Attic by origin, said that for Alexander it would be the finest of all his feats in Asia if he joined them in a triumphal procession, set fire to the palaces, and permitted women's hands in a minute to extinguish the famed accomplishments of the Persians. (3) This was said to men who were still young and giddy with wine, and so, as would be expected, someone shouted out to form up and to light torches, and urged all to take vengeance for the destruction of the Greek temples. (4) Others took up the cry and said that this was a deed worthy of Alexander alone. When the king had caught fire at their words, all leaped up from their couches and passed the word along to form a victory procession [epinikion komon] in honor of Dionysius.

(5) Promptly, many torches were gathered. Female musicians were present at the banquet, so the king led them all out for the komos to the sound of voices and flutes and pipes, Thais the courtesan leading the whole performance. (6) She was the first, after the king, to hurl her blazing torch into the palace. As the others all did the same, immediately the entire palace area was consumed, so great was the conflagration. It was most remarkable that the impious act of Xerxes, king of the Persians, against the acropolis at Athens should have been repaid in kind after many years by one woman, a citizen of the land which had suffered it, and in sport.

— Diodorus Siculus, 17.70.1–73.2, 17.70 (1)

On the following day, the king called together the leaders of his forces and informed them that "no city was more mischievous to the Greeks than the seat of the ancient kings of Persia [...] by its destruction they ought to offer sacrifice to the spirits of their forefathers."

7 (1) But Alexander's great mental endowments, that noble disposition, in which he surpassed all kings, that intrepidity in encountering dangers, his promptness in forming and carrying out plans, his good faith towards those who submitted to him, merciful treatment of his prisoners, temperance even in lawful and usual pleasures, were sullied by an excessive love of wine. (2) At the very time when his enemy and his rival for a throne was preparing to renew the war, when those whom he had conquered were but lately subdued and were hostile to the new rule, he took part in prolonged banquets at which women were present, not indeed those whom it would be a crime to violate, but, to be sure, harlots who were accustomed to live with armed men with more licence than was fitting.

(3) One of these, Thais by name, herself also drunken, declared that the king would win most favor among all the Greeks, if he should order the palace of the Persians to be set on fire; that this was expected by those whose cities the barbarians had destroyed. (4) When a drunken strumpet had given her opinion on a matter of such moment, one or two, themselves also loaded with wine, agreed. The king, too, more greedy for wine than able to carry it, cried: "Why do we not, then, avenge Greece and apply torches to the city?" (5) All had become heated with wine, and so they arose when drunk to fire the city which they had spared when armed. The king was the first to throw a firebrand upon the palace, then the guests and the servants and courtesans. The palace had been built largely of cedar, which quickly took fire and spread the conflagration widely. (6) When the army, which was encamped not far from the city, saw the fire, thinking it accidental, they rushed to bear aid. (7) But when they came to the vestibule of the palace, they saw the king himself piling on firebrands. Therefore, they left the water which they had brought, and they too began to throw dry wood upon the burning building.

(8) Such was the end of the capital of the entire Orient... .

(10) The Macedonians were ashamed that so renowned a city had been destroyed by their king in a drunken revel; therefore the act was taken as earnest, and they forced themselves to believe that it was right that it should be wiped out in exactly that manner.

— Quintus Curtius Rufus 5.6.1–7.12 5.6 (1)

And did not Alexander the Great have with him Thais, the Athenian hetaira? Cleitarchus speaks of her as having been the cause for the burning of the palace at Persepolis. After Alexander's death, this same Thais was married to Ptolemy, the first king of Egypt.

— Cleitarchus, FGrHist. 137, F. 11 (= Athenaeus 13. 576d-e)

== Modern events ==
=== 2,500-year celebration ===
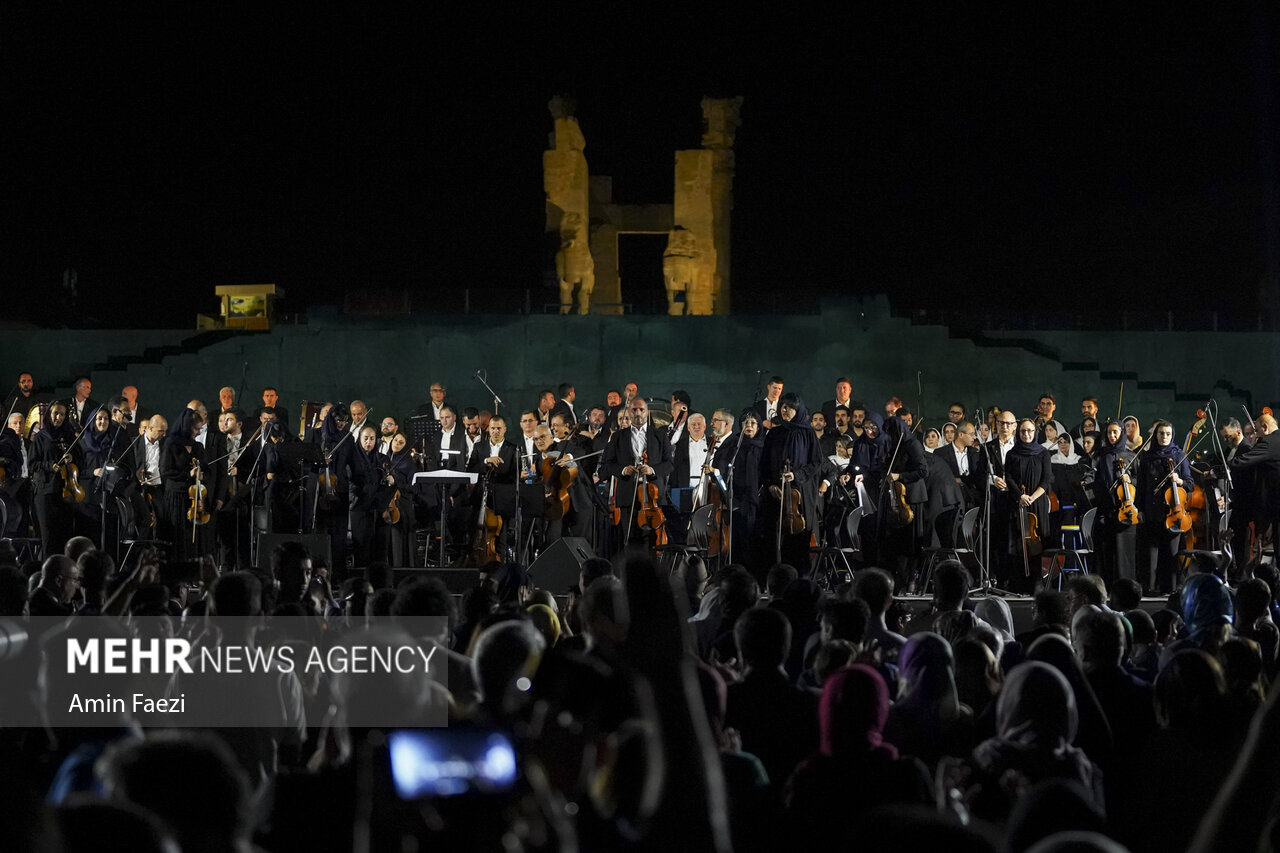
Persepolis hosted the 100th anniversary of the Armenian Philharmonic Orchestra on September 6, 2025.

In 1971, Persepolis was the main staging ground for the 2,500-year celebration of the Persian Empire under the reign of Mohammad Reza Pahlavi, the second and last Shah of the Pahlavi dynasty. It included delegations from foreign nations in an attempt to advance the Iranian culture and history.

=== First concert ===
In a groundbreaking cultural event, Iranian vocalist Alireza Ghorbani performed the first-ever concert at Persepolis from 29 June to 1 July 2024, and received an overwhelmingly enthusiastic response from attendees. Another historic event took place on September 6, 2025, with Persepolis hosting the 100th anniversary of the Armenian Philharmonic Orchestra. Over 1,500 people attended. With ambassadors from 23 countries and envoys from the UN, it was the first-ever international public concert at Persepolis, a historic cultural milestone for Iran-Armenia, and the site's second international event since the 2,500-year celebration of the Persian Empire in 1971.

=== Nowruz Celebrations ===
Every year during Nowruz, a large number of people come to Persepolis to celebrate the new year. In 2024, 10,000 people were at Persepolis when Nowruz started.

=== Cultural events ===
Various events are held in Persepolis every year, including the Shahnameh reading festival and other cultural events.

=== Conservation issues ===
The site is also threatened by the presence of lichens that have grown on the surface of the monuments, some of which have eroded intricate carvings and motifs. Some of the lichens are estimated to be around 1,700 years old, and their spread has been attributed to industrialisation, acid rain and the extreme desert climate.

=== The controversy of the Sivand Dam ===
Construction of the Sivand Dam, named after the nearby town of Sivand, began on 19 September 2006. Despite 10 years of planning, Iran's Cultural Heritage Organization was not aware of the broad areas of flooding during much of this time, and there is growing concern about the effects the dam will have on the surrounding areas of Persepolis. Activists expressed concern that the dam's placement between the ruins of Pasargadae and Persepolis will flood both. Engineers involved with the construction deny this claim, stating that it is impossible, because both sites sit well above the planned waterline. Of the two sites, Pasargadae is considered the more threatened.

== Museums (outside Iran) that display objects from Persepolis ==
One bas-relief from Persepolis is in the Fitzwilliam Museum in Cambridge, England. The largest collection of reliefs is at the British Museum, sourced from multiple British travellers who worked in Iran in the 19th century. The Persepolis bull at the Oriental Institute in Chicago is one of the university's most prized treasures, part of the division of finds from the excavations of the 1930s. New York City's Metropolitan Museum and Detroit Institute of Art houses objects from Persepolis, as does the Museum of Archaeology and Anthropology of the University of Pennsylvania. The Museum of Fine Arts of Lyon and the Louvre of Paris hold objects from Persepolis as well. A bas-relief of a soldier that had been looted from the excavations in 1935–36 and later purchased by the Montreal Museum of Fine Arts was repatriated to Iran in 2018, after being offered for sale in London and New York.

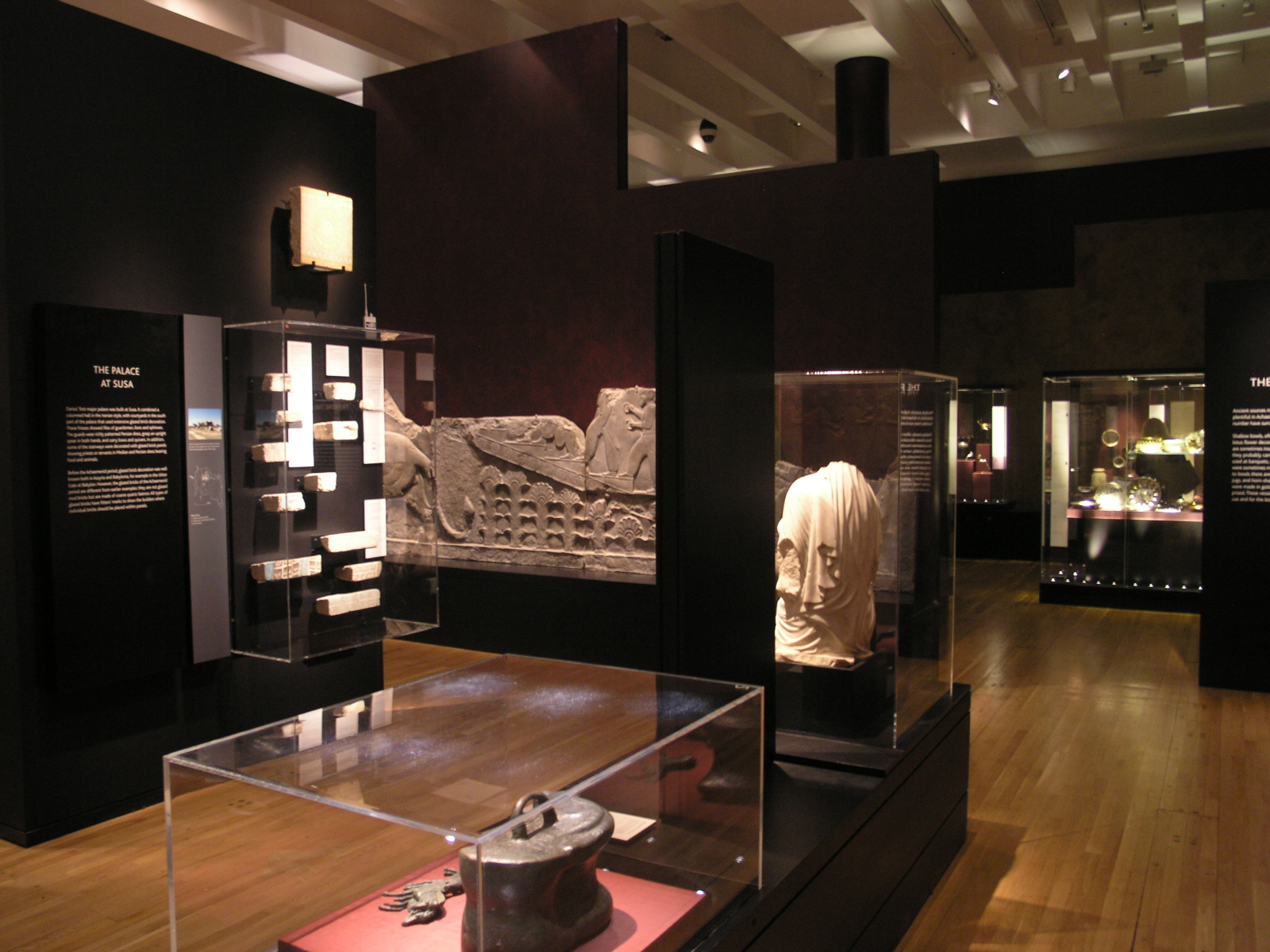
Forgotten Empire Exhibition, the British Museum

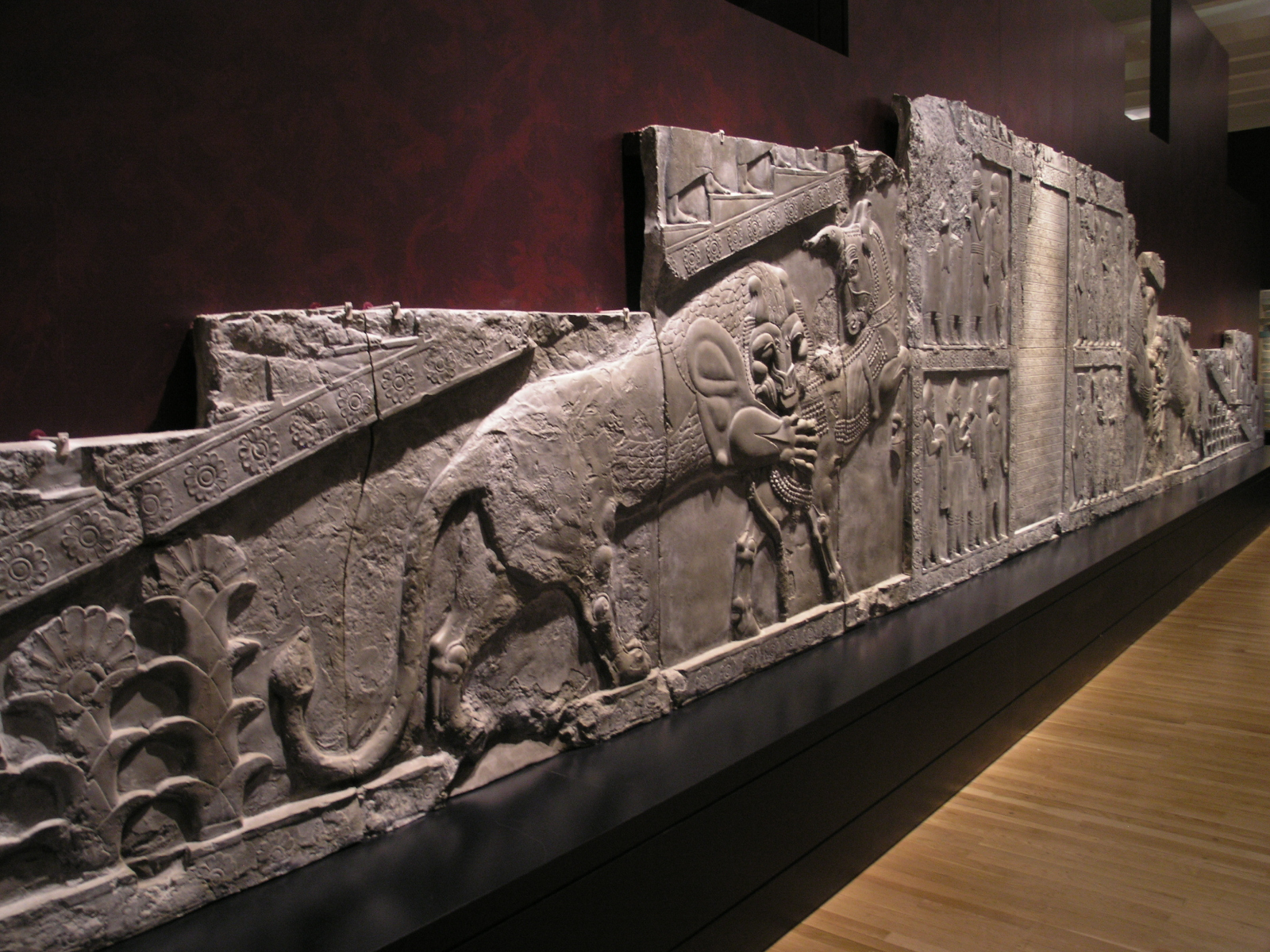
Forgotten Empire Exhibition, the British Museum

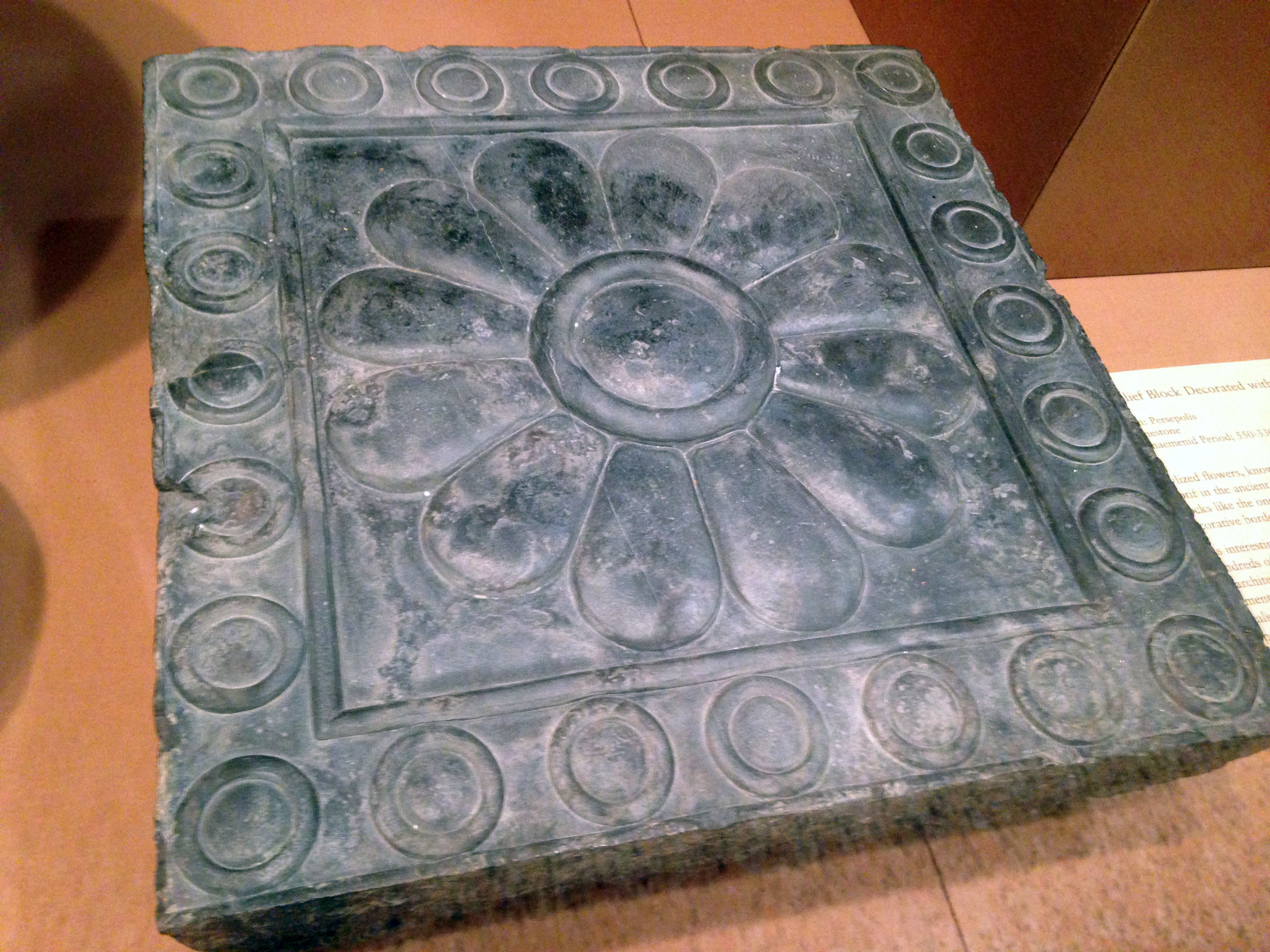
Persepolitan rosette rock relief, kept at the Oriental Institute

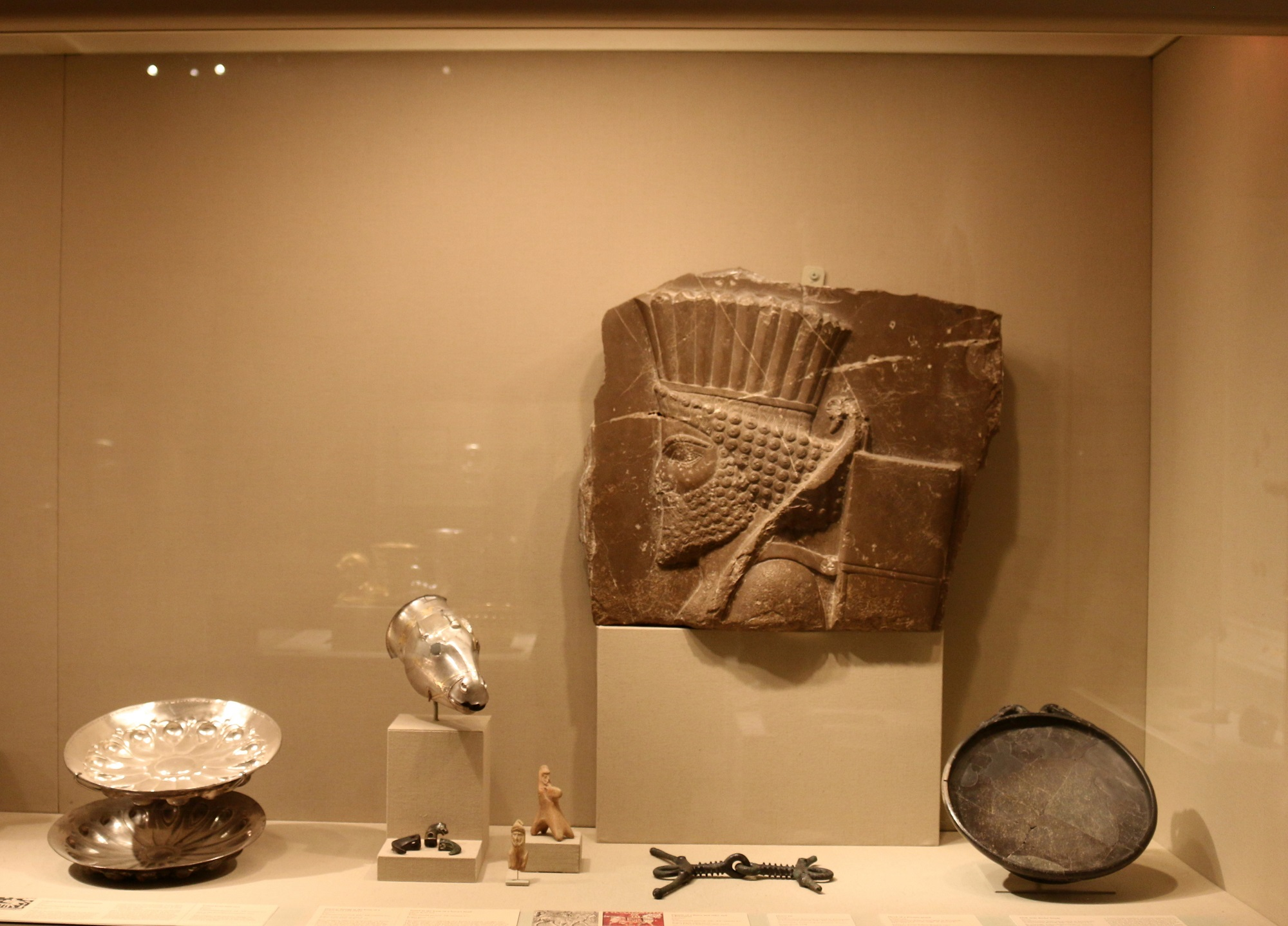
Achaemenid objects at the Metropolitan Museum of Art, including a bas relief from Persepolis

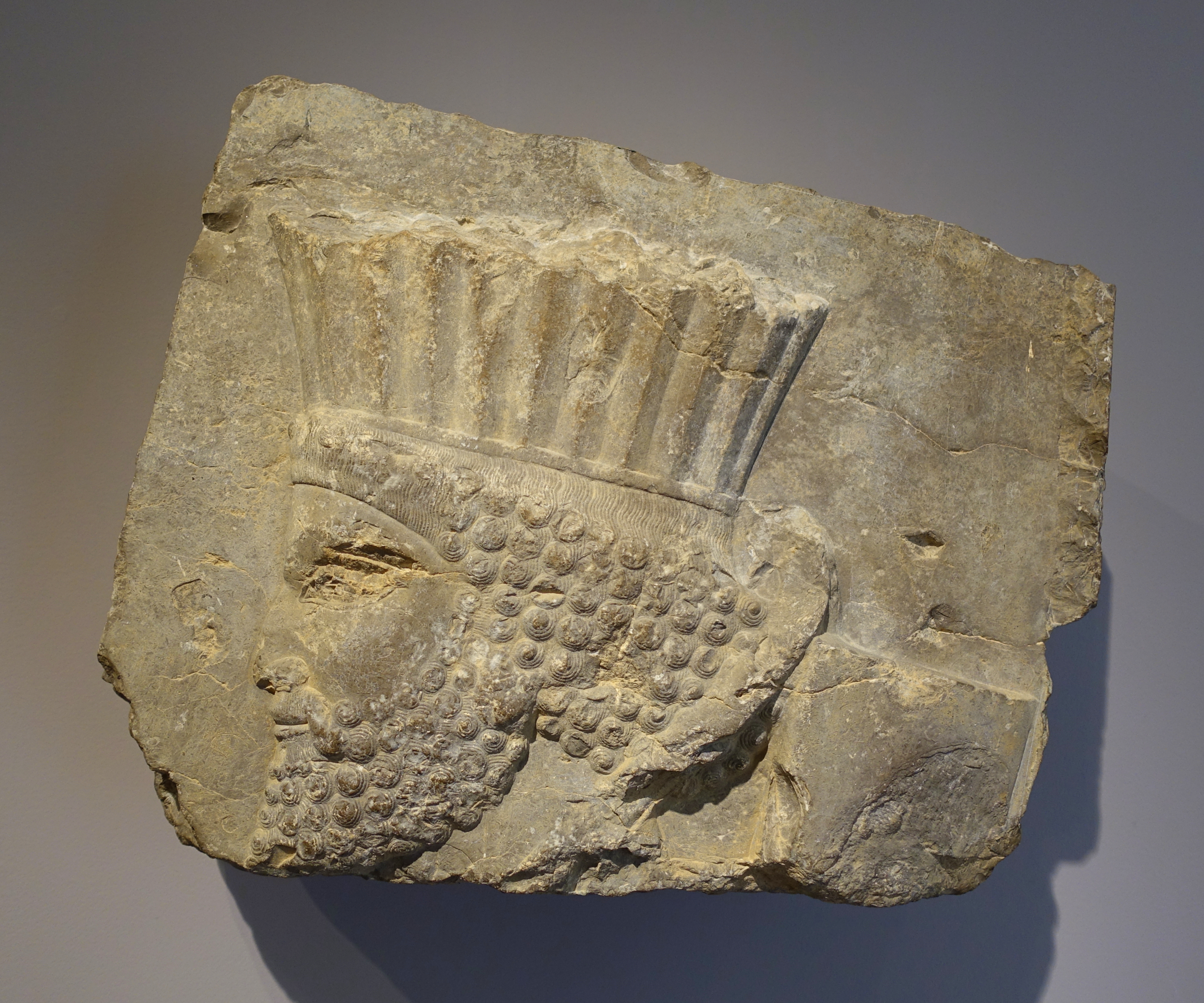
Head of an archer of the royal guard from Hadish palace, Sackler Museum - Harvard University

== Foreign visitors graffiti at Persepolis ==
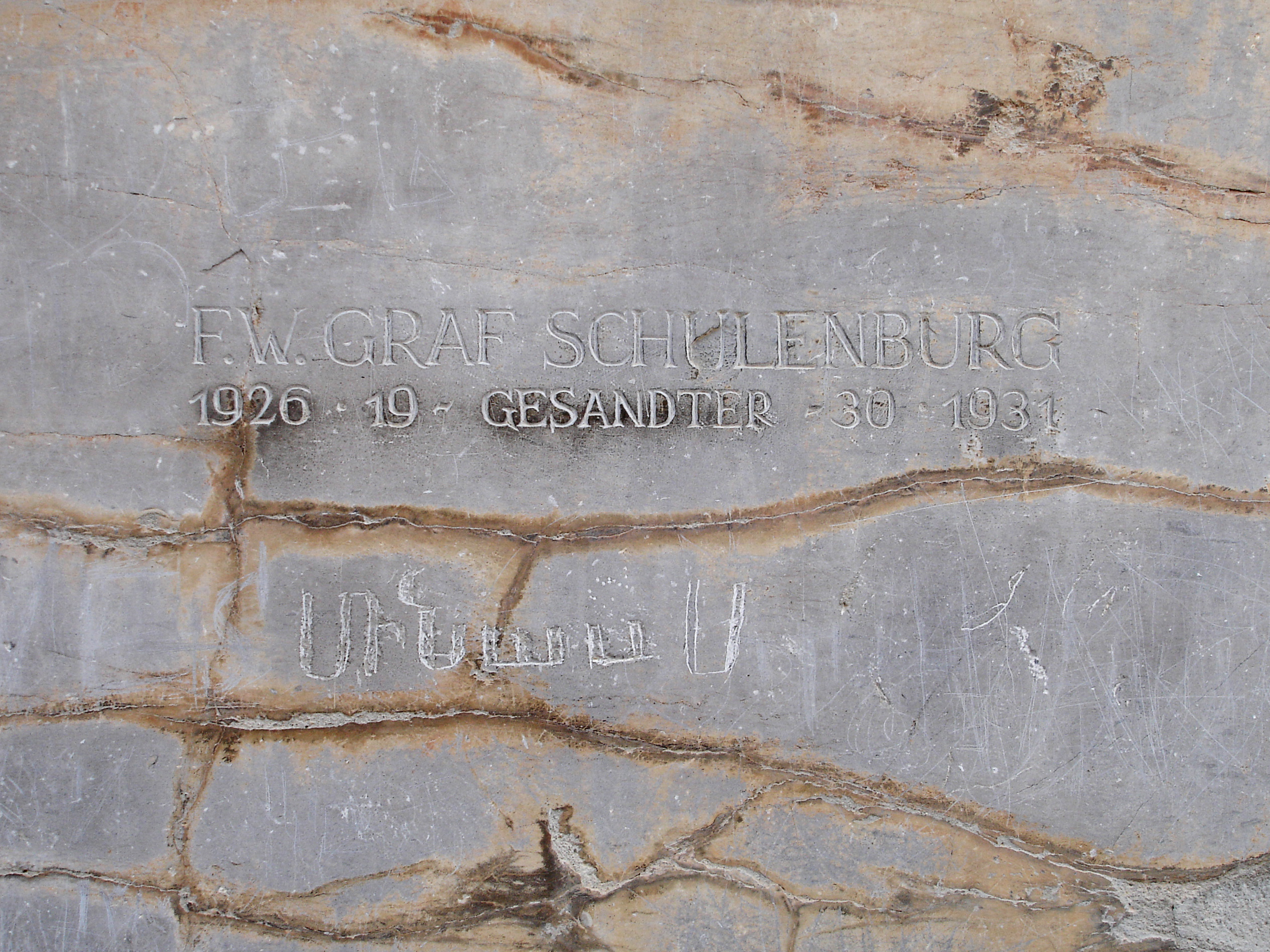
Friedrich Werner von der Schulenburg inscription on an ancient monument at the entrance of Persepolis (Iran)

Some European travelers throughout history have left graffiti on the walls of Persepolis during their visits.

== Accounting Records ==
A damaged tablet from the Persepolis Fortification Archive, dating to around 500 BC, records the distribution of at least 600 quarts of an unidentified commodity among five villages, providing rare evidence that Old Persian was also used for everyday administration.

== Gallery ==
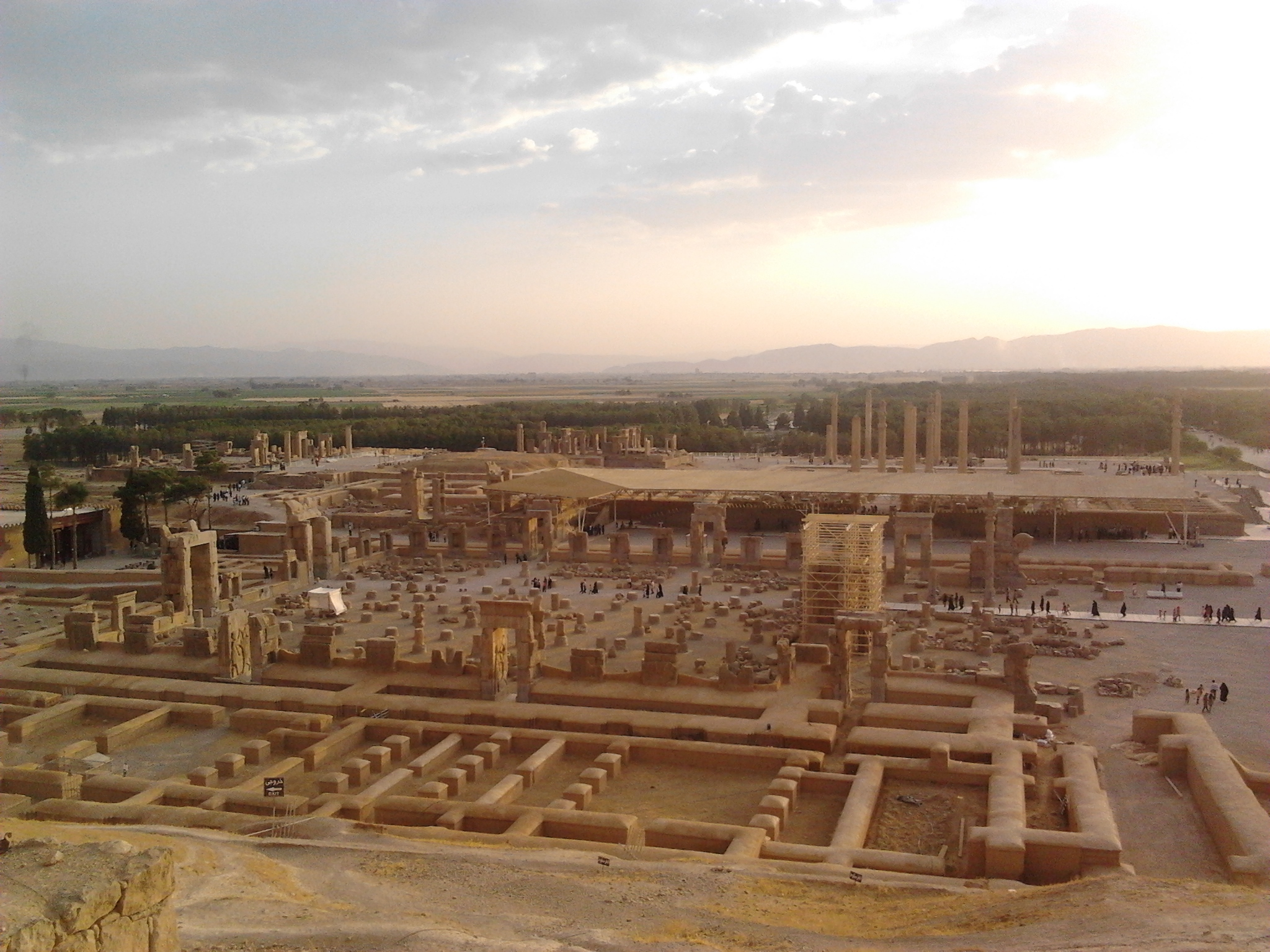
A general view of the Persepolis.

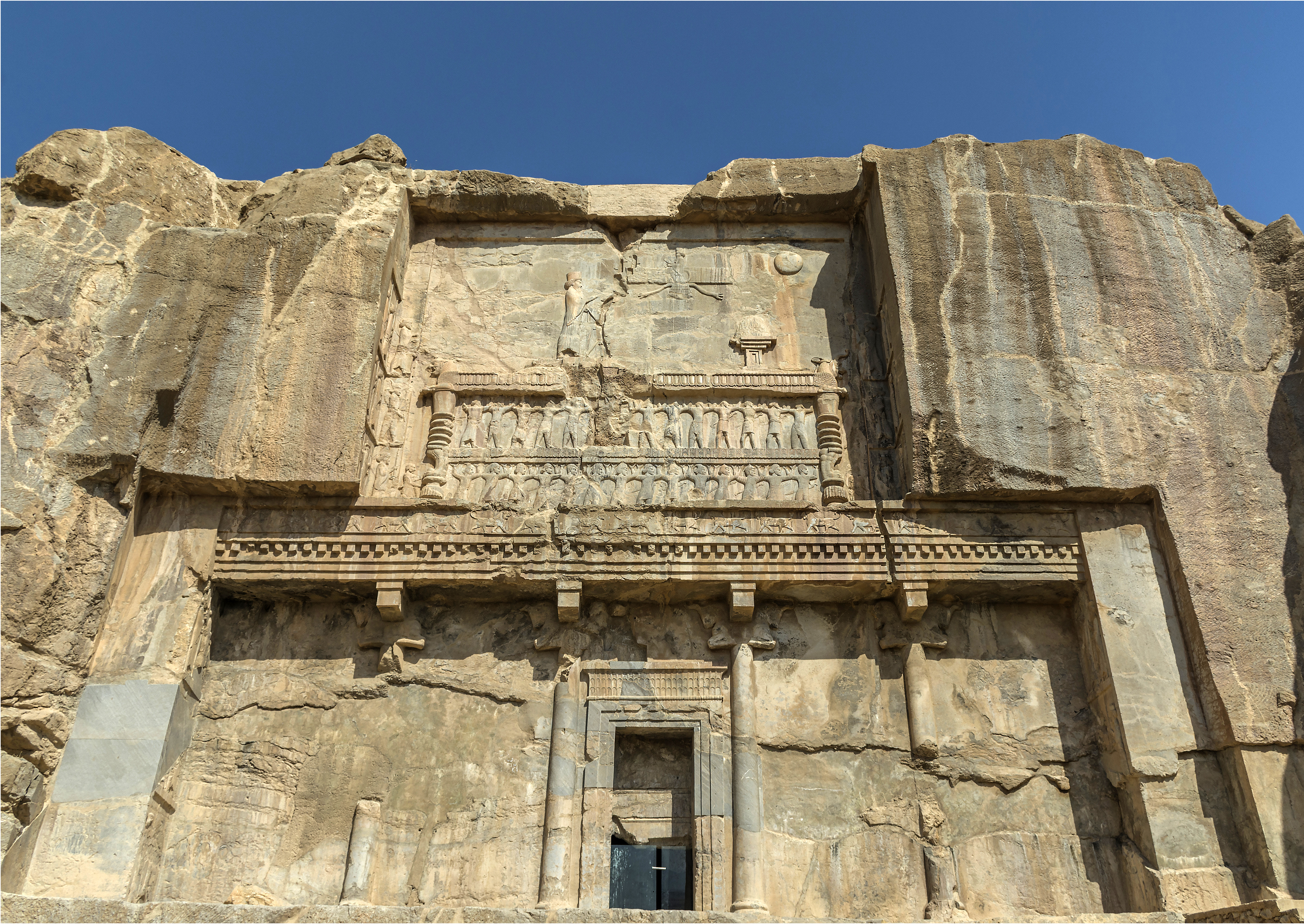
The tomb of Artaxerxes II at Persepolis

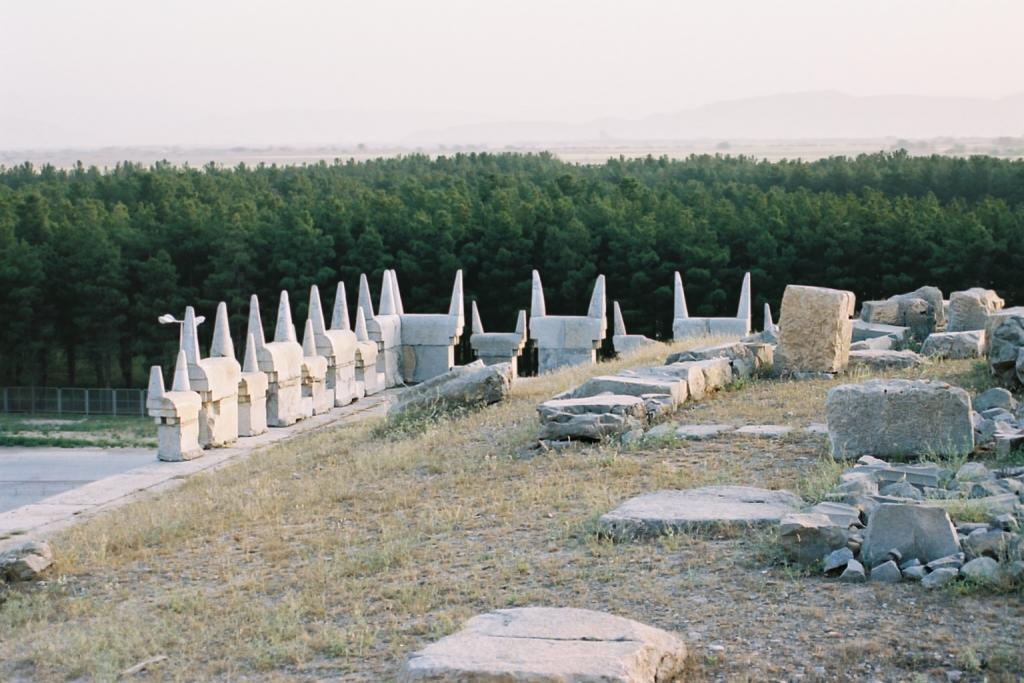
Horn-shaped stones at Persepolis.

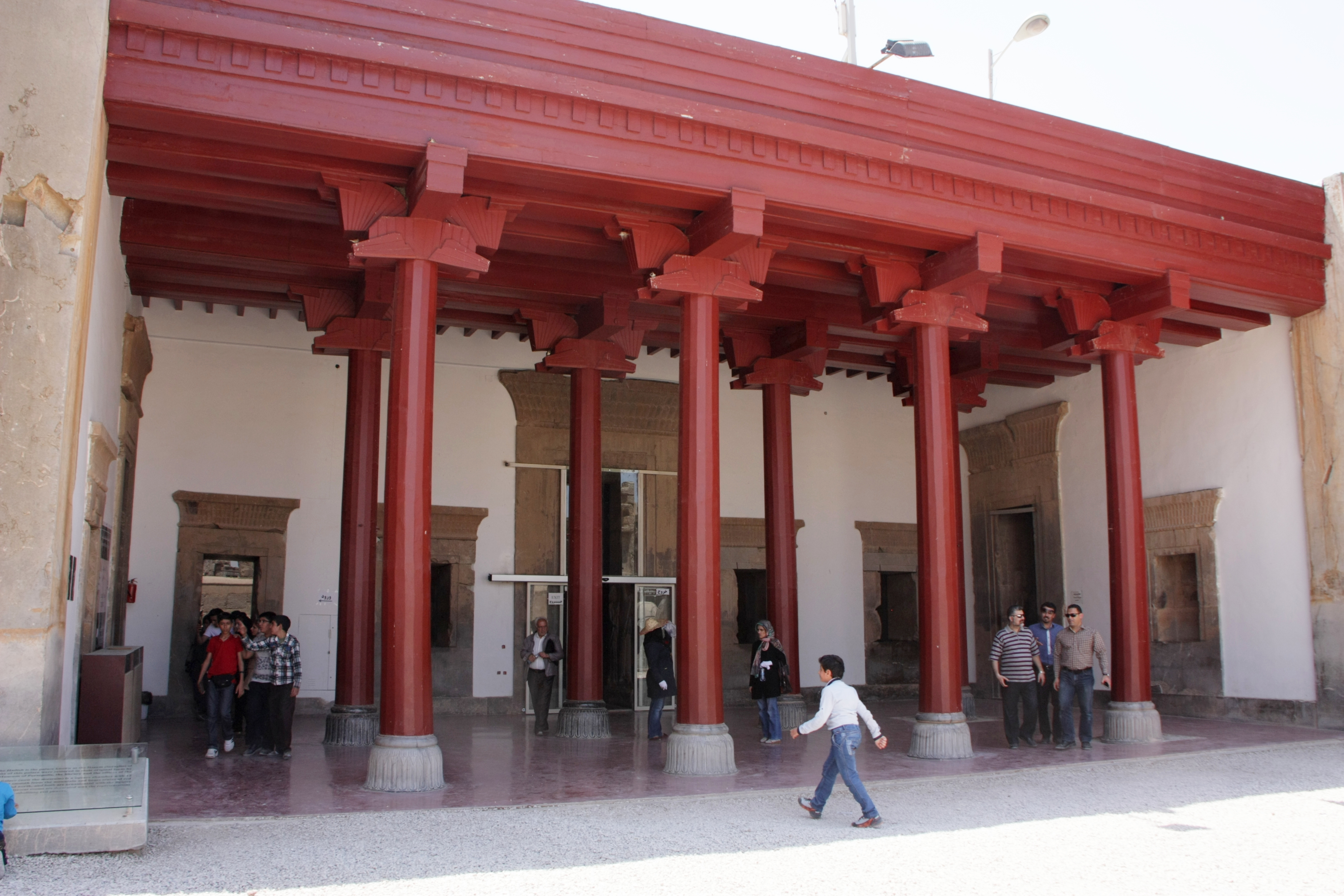
The Queen's Quarters, built by the order of Xerxes. The palace was excavated and rebuilt by Ernst Herzfeld in 1931, and today it is used as a museum and the central office of Persepolis.

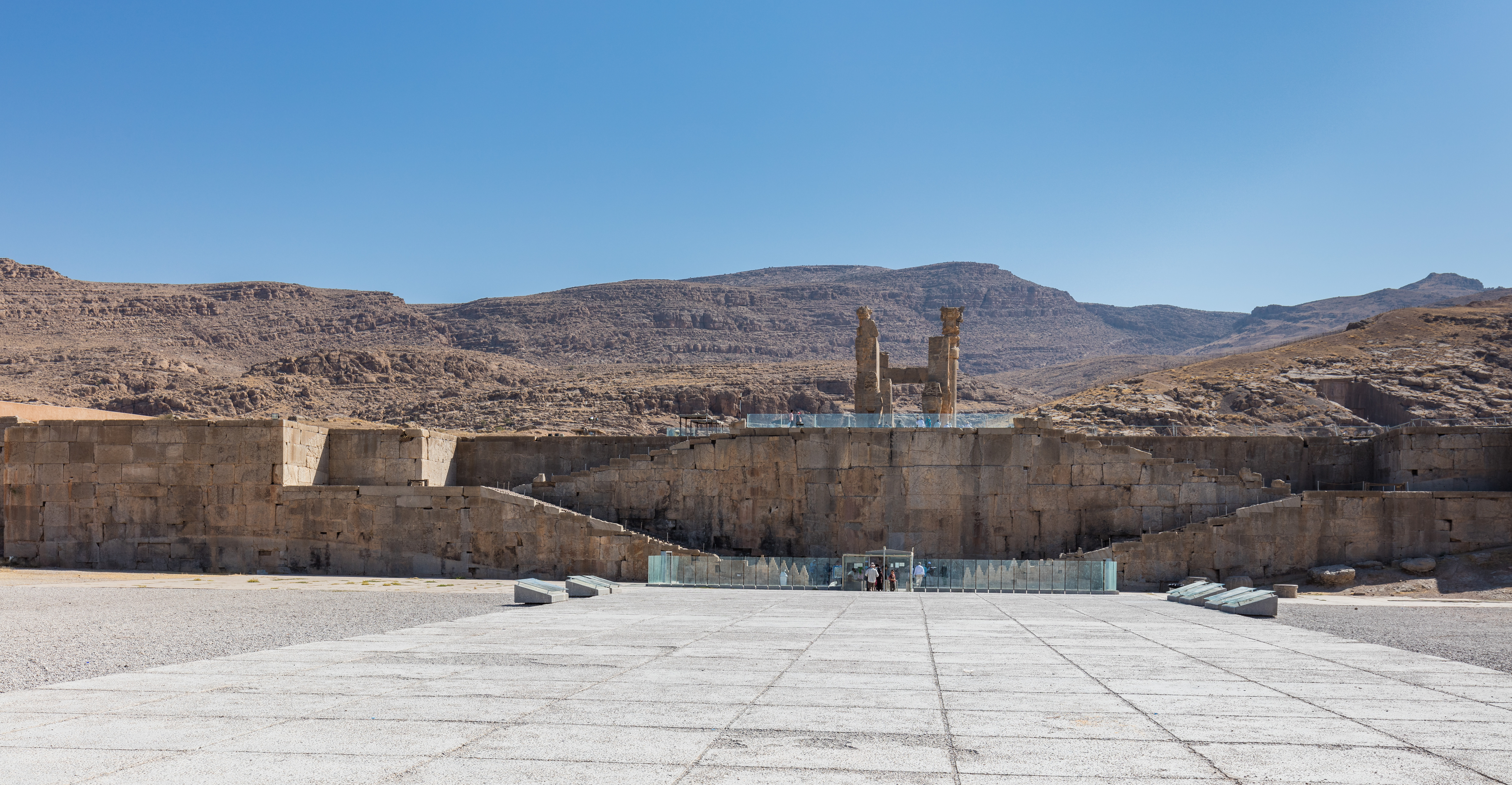
The entrance of Persepolis.

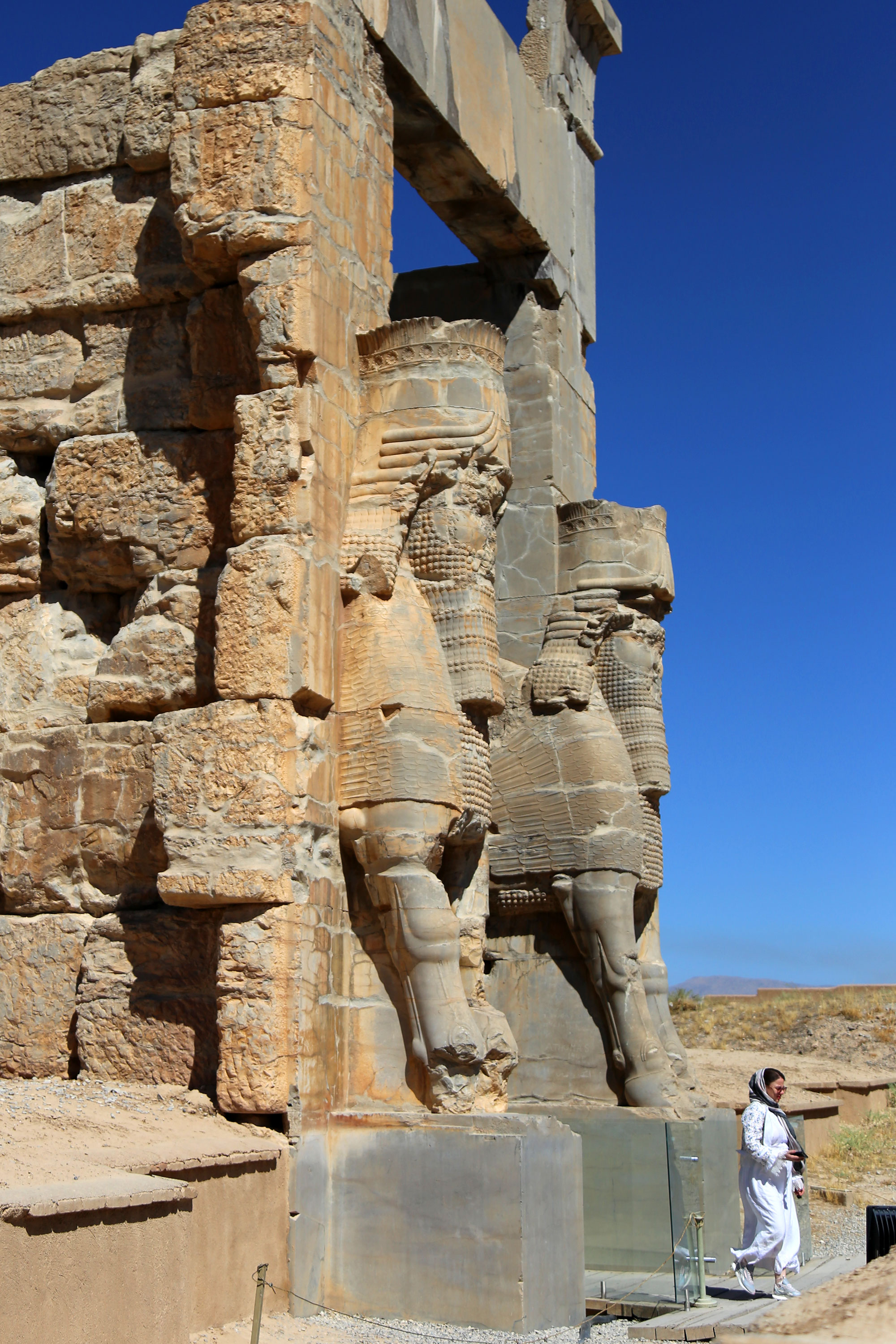
Persepolis, Fars province, Iran

== See also ==
- Achaemenid architecture
- Behistun Inscription
- Cities of the Ancient Near East
- Foreign Visitors Graffiti at Persepolis
- Istakhr
- List of World Heritage Sites in Iran
- Naqsh-e Rustam
- Palace of Darius in Susa, similar structure built at the same time
- Pasargadae
- Persepolis (comics)
- Persepolis F.C.
- Qadamgah (ancient site)
- Tachara
