= Foreign visitors graffiti at Persepolis =

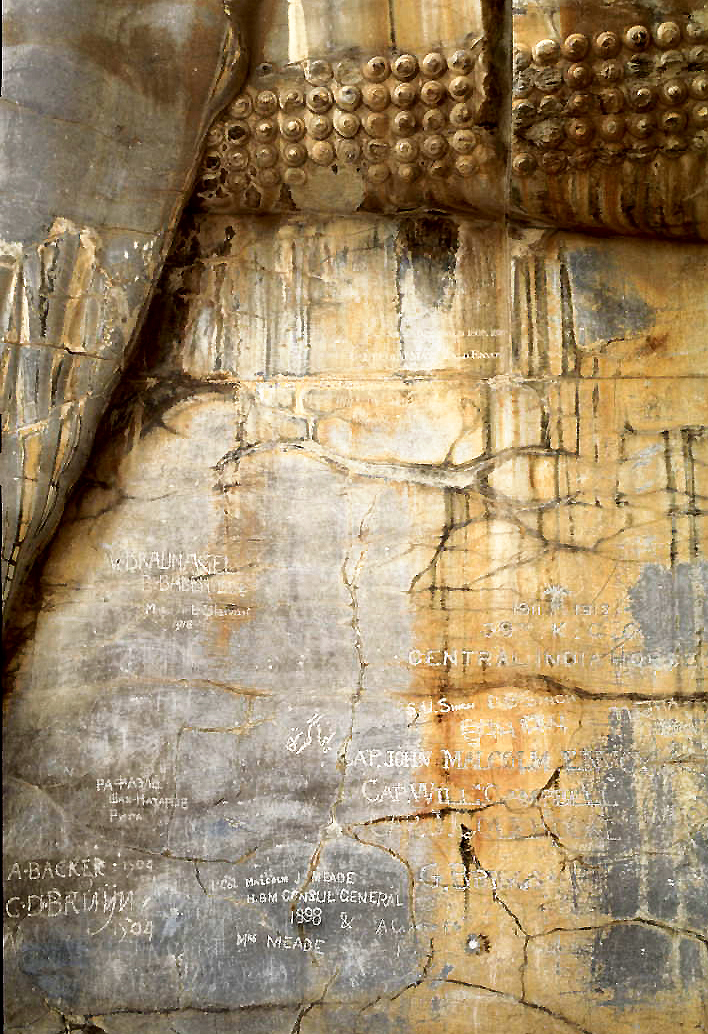
Foreign Visitors Graffiti at Persepolis

Foreign Visitors Graffiti at Persepolis include more than 200 graffiti carved by foreign visitors while visiting Persepolis, the capital of Achaemenid Empire (c. 550–330 BC). Theses graffiti are concentrated in two spots, namely Gate of All Nations and the palace of Apadana.

Most of the foreign graffiti belong to British visitors, occasionally accompanied by their wives. Some other Dutch, French, German, Russian, American, and Indian names and one Hungarian name can also be found in the site. Excluding the Persian, Hebrew, and Armenian graffiti, a total of some 222 names have been recorded. The first names were carved in the 17th century.
