= Lamassu =

Tutelary spirit in Assyrian mythology

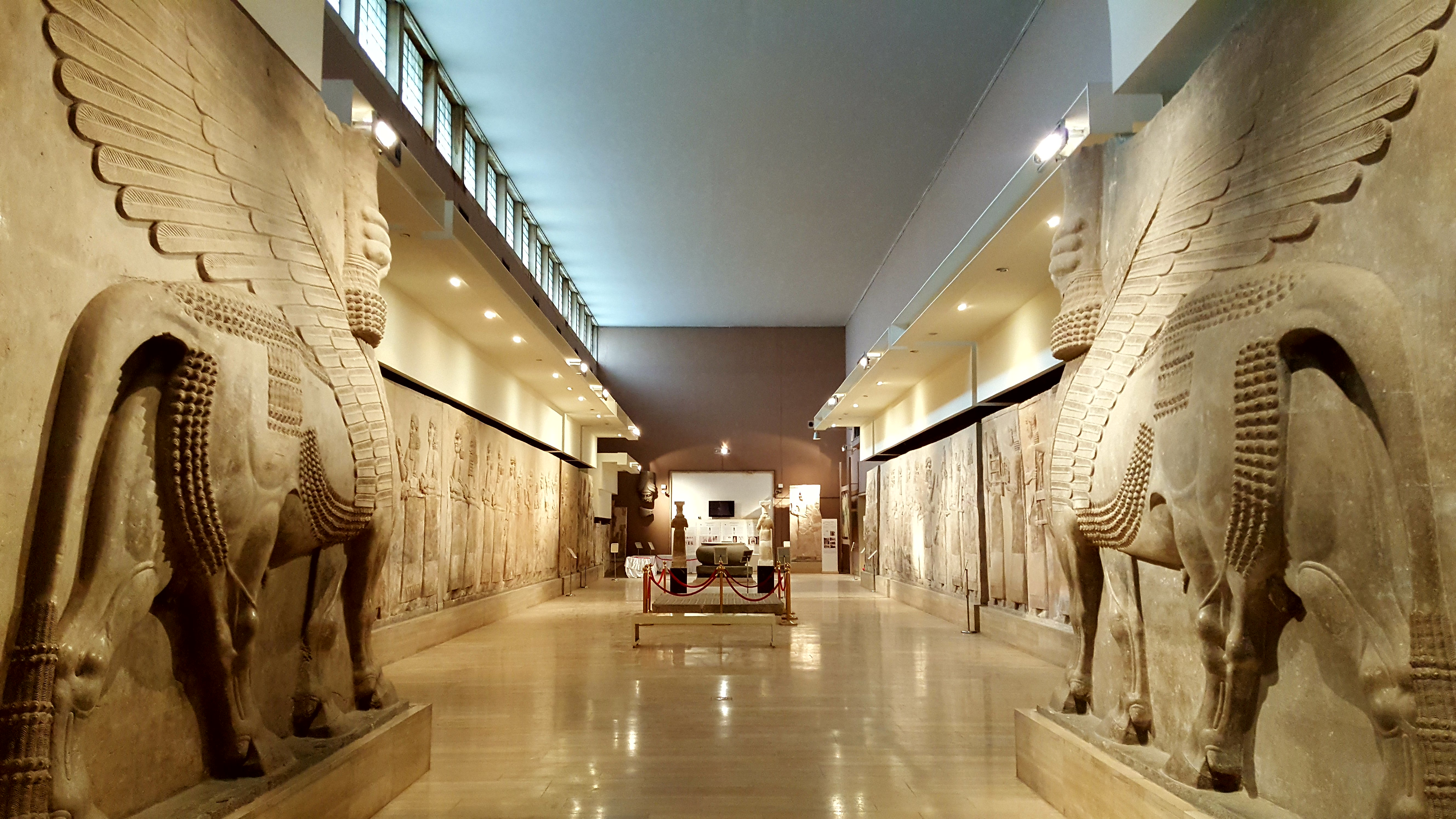
Lamassu at the Iraq Museum, Baghdad

Lama, Lamma, or Lamassu (Cuneiform: 𒀭𒆗, an.kal; Sumerian: ^{d}lammař; later in Akkadian: lamassu; sometimes called a lamassuse) is a Mesopotamian protective deity.

Initially depicted as a goddess in Sumerian times, when it was called Lamma, it was later depicted from Assyrian times as a hybrid of a human, bird, and either a bull or lion—specifically having a human head, the body of a bull or a lion, and bird wings, under the name Lamassu. In some writings, it is portrayed to represent a goddess. A less frequently used name is shedu (Cuneiform: 𒀭𒆘, an.kal×bad; Sumerian: ^{d}alad; Akkadian, šēdu), which refers to the male counterpart of a lamassu. Lamassu represent the zodiacs, parent-stars or constellations.

== Goddess Lama ==
The goddess Lama appears initially as a mediating goddess who precedes the orans and presents them to the deities. The protective deity is clearly labelled as Lam(m)a in a Kassite stele unearthed at Uruk, in the temple of Ishtar, goddess to which she had been dedicated by king Nazi-Maruttash (1307–1282 BC). It is a goddess wearing a ruffled dress and wearing a horned tiara symbolizing the deity, with two hands raised, in a sign of prayer. Agnès Spycket proposed that similar female figures appearing in particular in glyptics and statuary from the Akkadian period, and in particular in the presentation scenes (common especially in the Paleo-Babylonian era) were to be considered as Lam(m)a. This opinion is commonly followed and in artistic terminology these female figures are generally referred to as Lam(m)a. From Assyrian times, Lamma becomes a hybrid deity, half-animal, half-human.

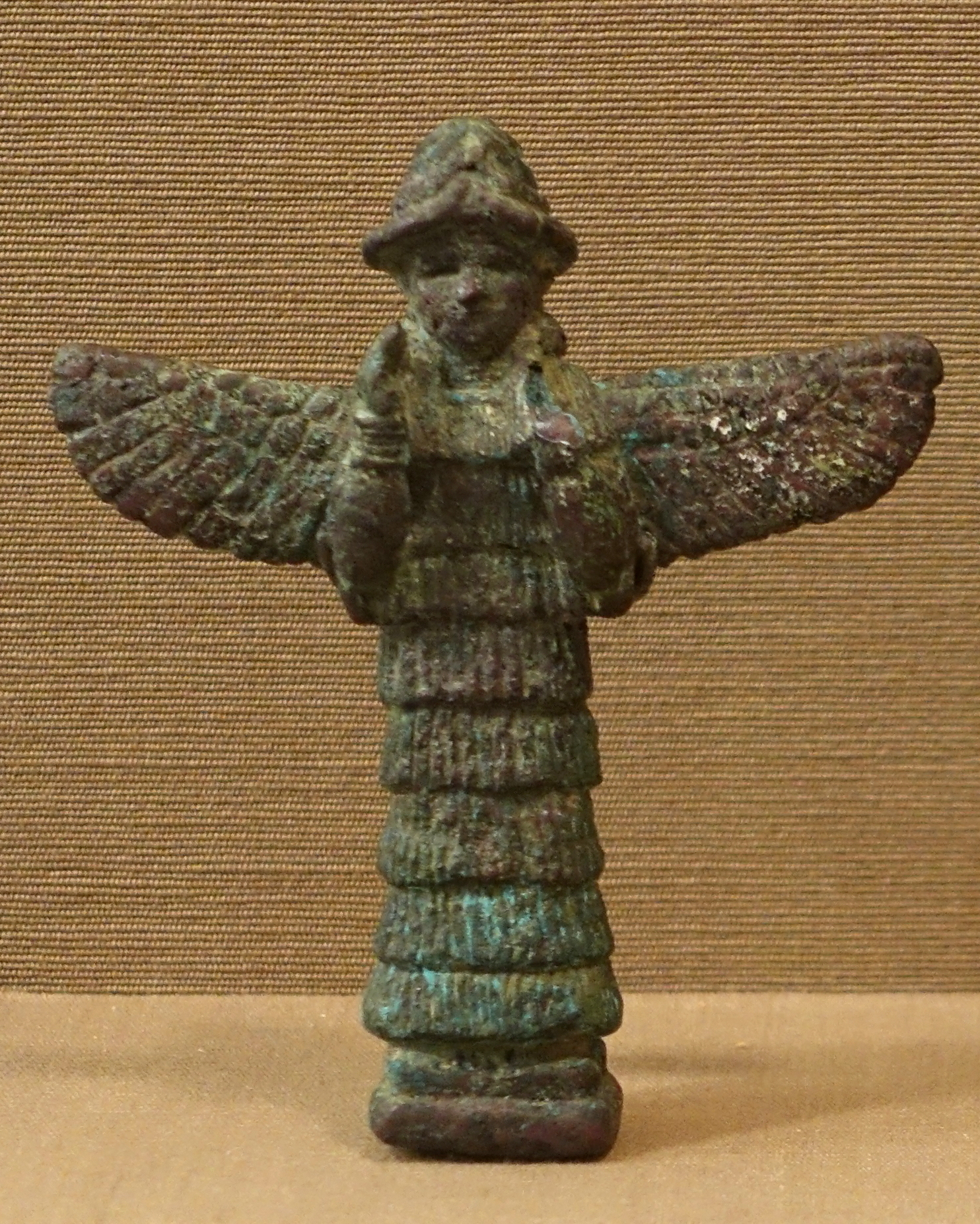
Lamma, protective winged deity, Sumerian Isin-Larsa period (2000–1800 BC)

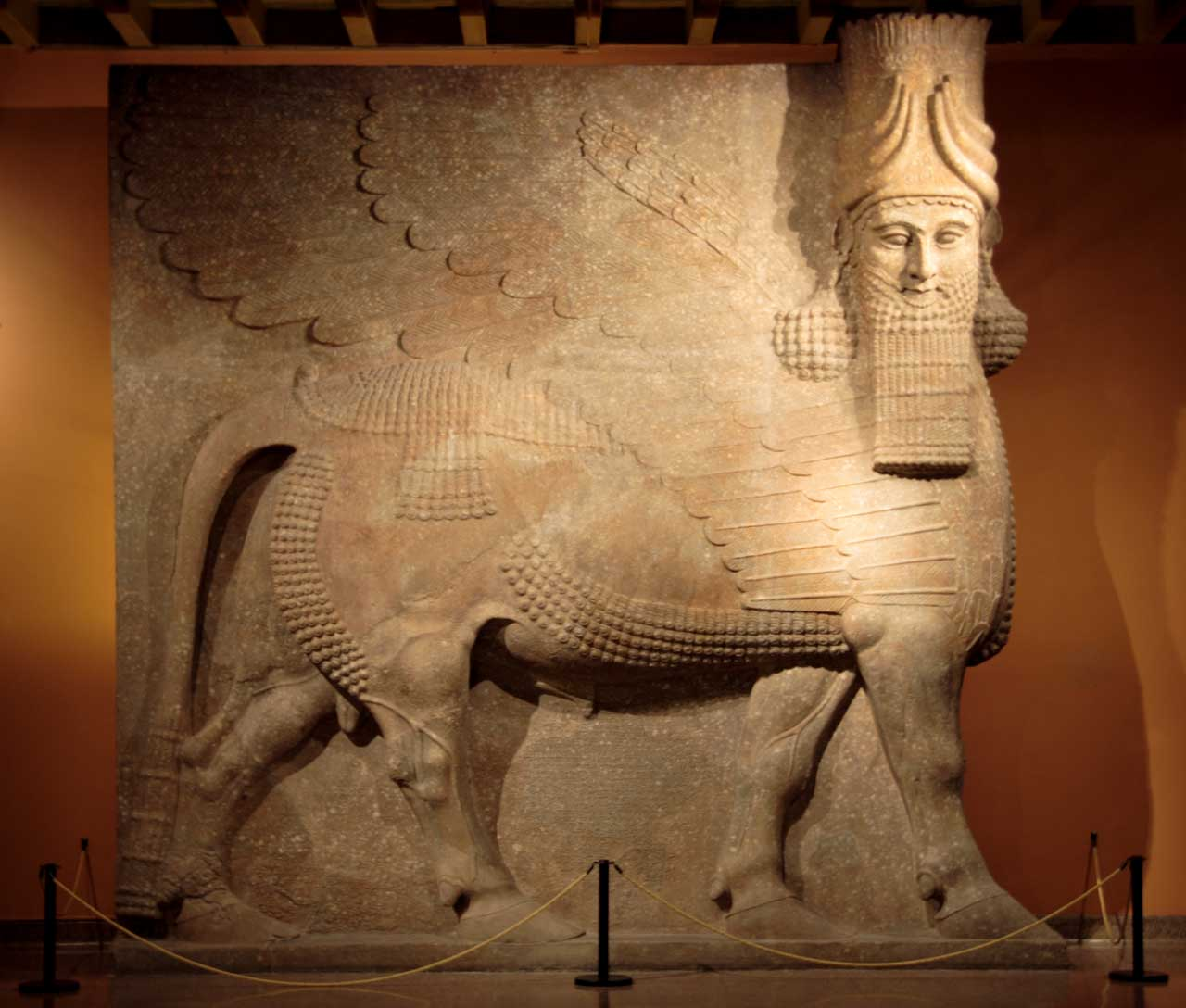
Lamassu, Neo-Assyrian Empire, c. 721–705 BC. Institute for the Study of Ancient Cultures, University of Chicago

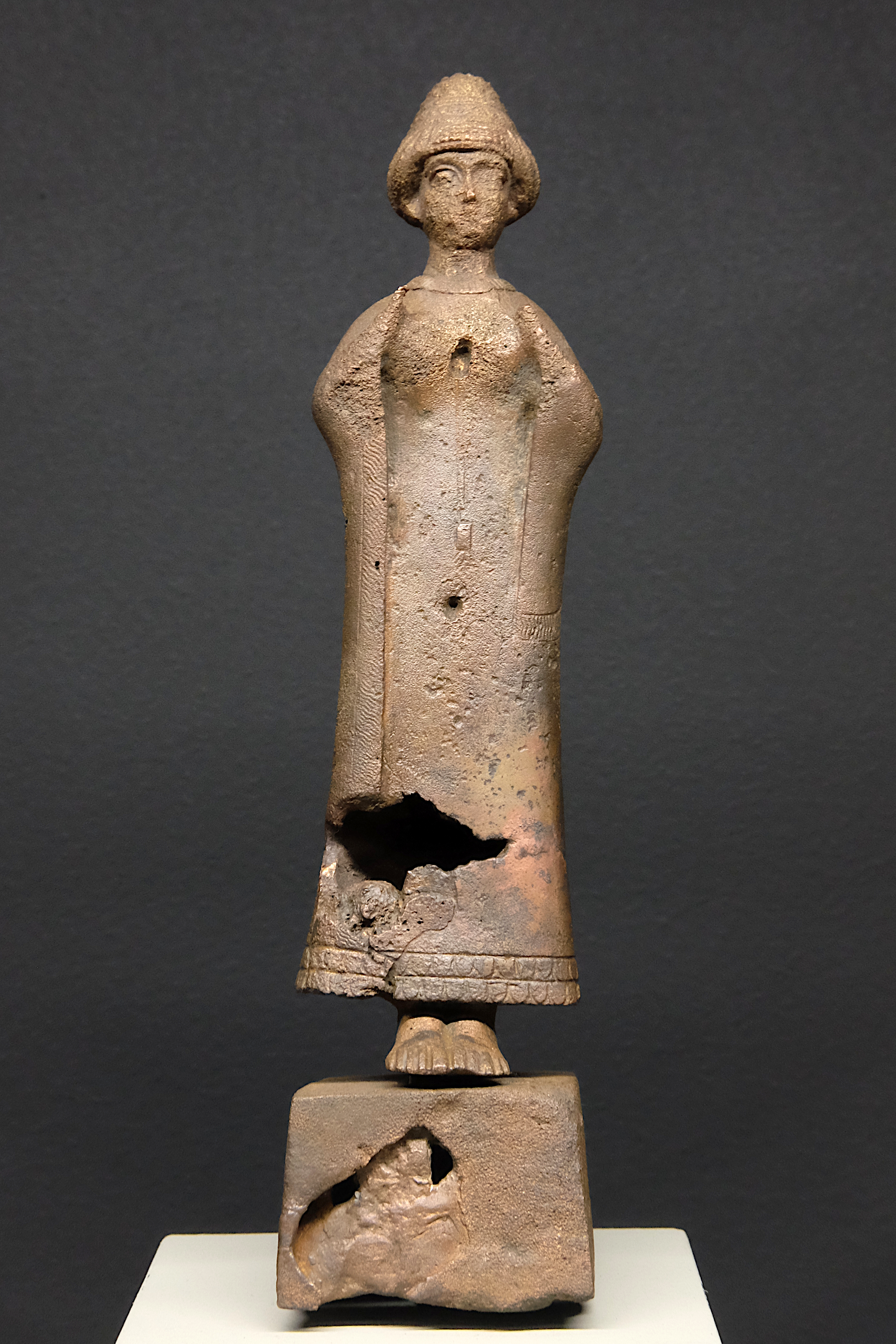
Statuette of the goddess Lama, probably made in a workshop on the outskirts of Mesopotamia. Isin-Larsa period (2000–1800 BC). Royal Museums of Art and History

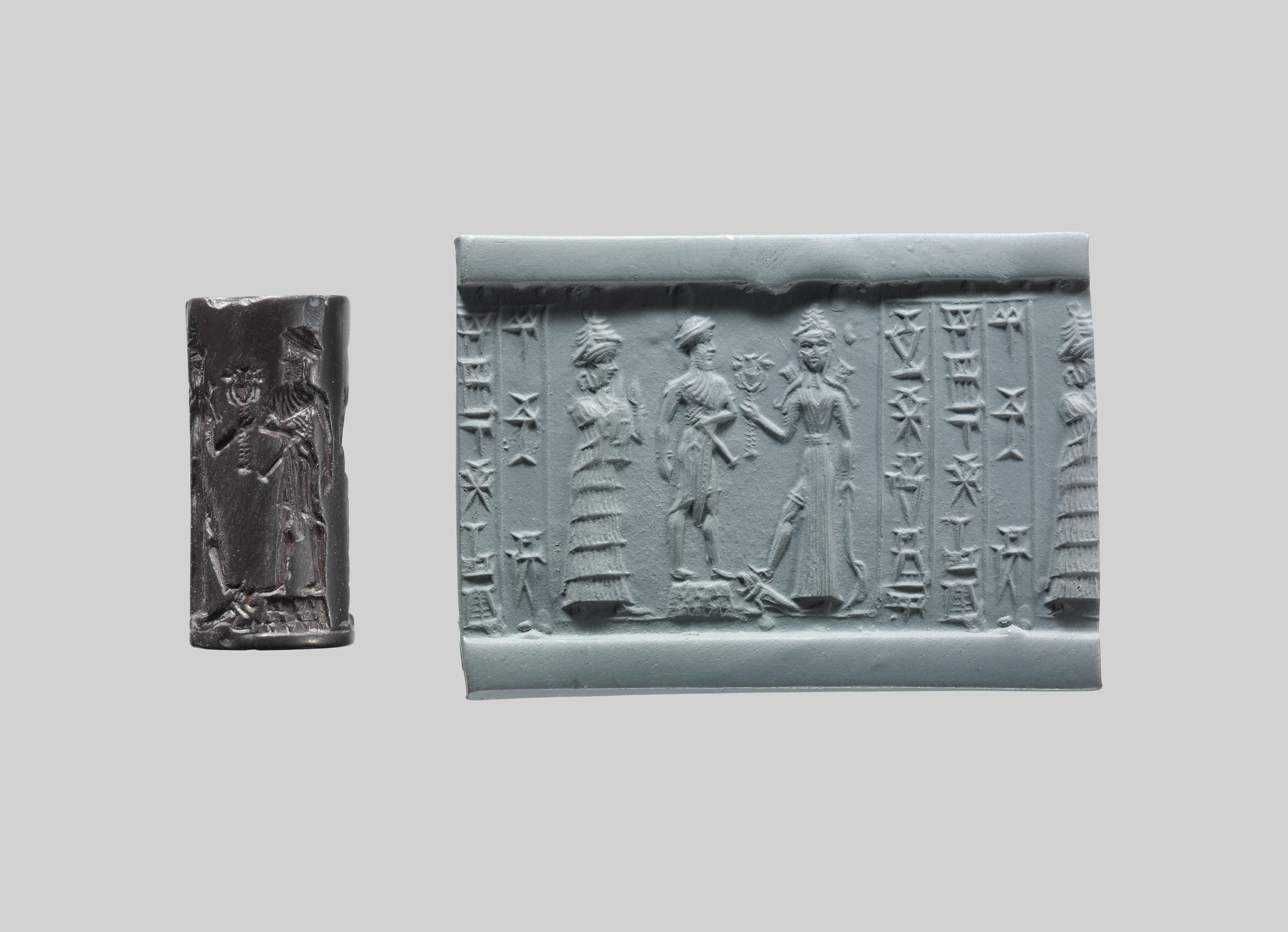
Cylinder seal showing the representation of a devotee (center) by goddess Lamma (left), to Ishtar (right). Babylonian, c. 18th–17th century BC, Metropolitan Museum of Art

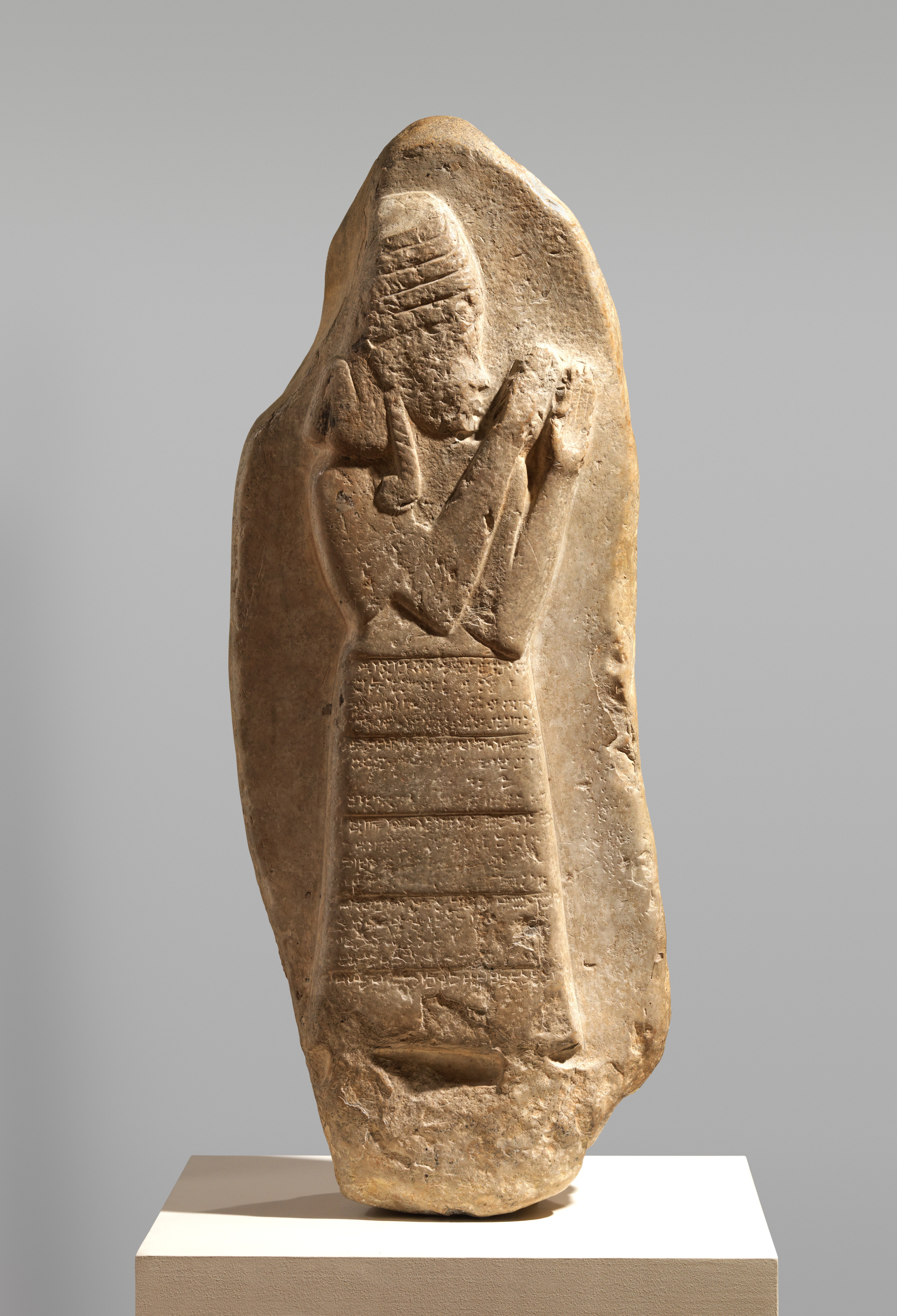
Stele with inscription showing the protective deity Lam(m)a, dedicated by king Nazi-Maruttash to goddess Ishtar, from Uruk (1307–1282 BC). Metropolitan Museum of Art

== Iconography ==
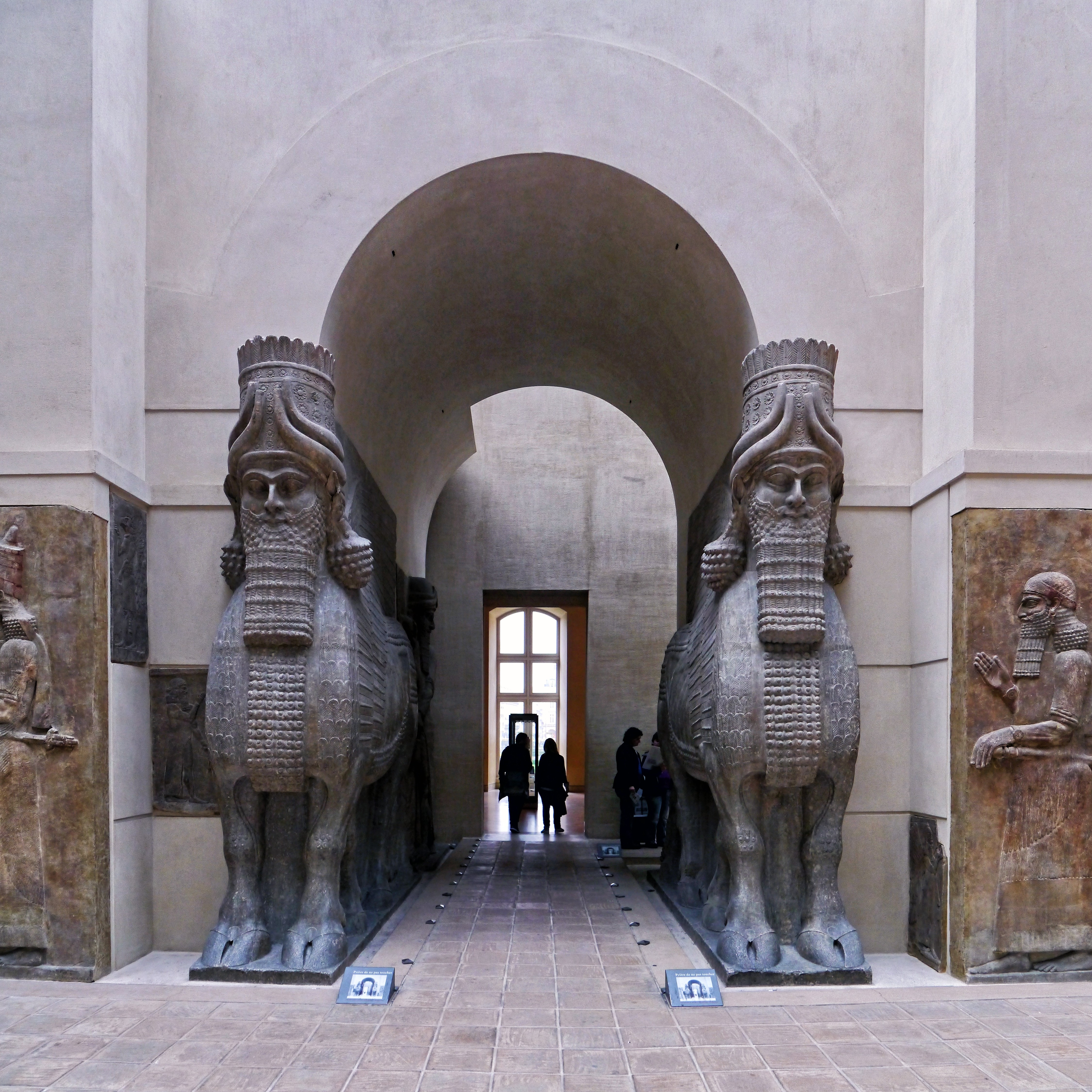
Human-headed winged bulls from Sargon II's palace in Dur-Sharrukin, modern Khorsabad (Louvre)

From Assyrian times, lamassu were depicted as hybrids, with bodies of either winged bulls or lions and heads of human males. The motif of a winged animal with a human head is common to the Near East, first recorded in Ebla around 3000 BC. The first distinct lamassu motif appeared in Assyria during the reign of Tiglath-Pileser II as a symbol of power.

Assyrian sculpture typically placed prominent pairs of lamassu at entrances in palaces, facing the street and also internal courtyards. They were represented as "double-aspect" figures on corners, in high relief. From the front, they appear to stand, and from the side, they walk. In earlier versions, they have five legs, as is apparent when viewed obliquely. Lamassu do not generally appear as large figures in the low-relief schemes running round palace rooms, where winged genie figures are common, but they sometimes appear within narrative reliefs, apparently protecting the Assyrians.

The colossal entrance figures were often followed by a hero grasping a wriggling lion, also colossal in scale and in high relief. In the palace of Sargon II at Dur-Sharrukin, a group of at least seven lamassu and two such heroes with lions surrounded the entrance to the "throne room", "a concentration of figures which produced an overwhelming impression of power". They also appear on cylinder seals. Notable examples include those at the Gate of All Nations at Persepolis in Iran, the British Museum in London, the Louvre in Paris, the National Museum of Iraq in Baghdad, the Metropolitan Museum of Art in New York, and the University of Chicago Oriental Institute. Several examples left in situ in northern Iraq were destroyed in the 2010s by the Islamic State when they occupied the area, as were those in the Mosul Museum.

== Terminology ==
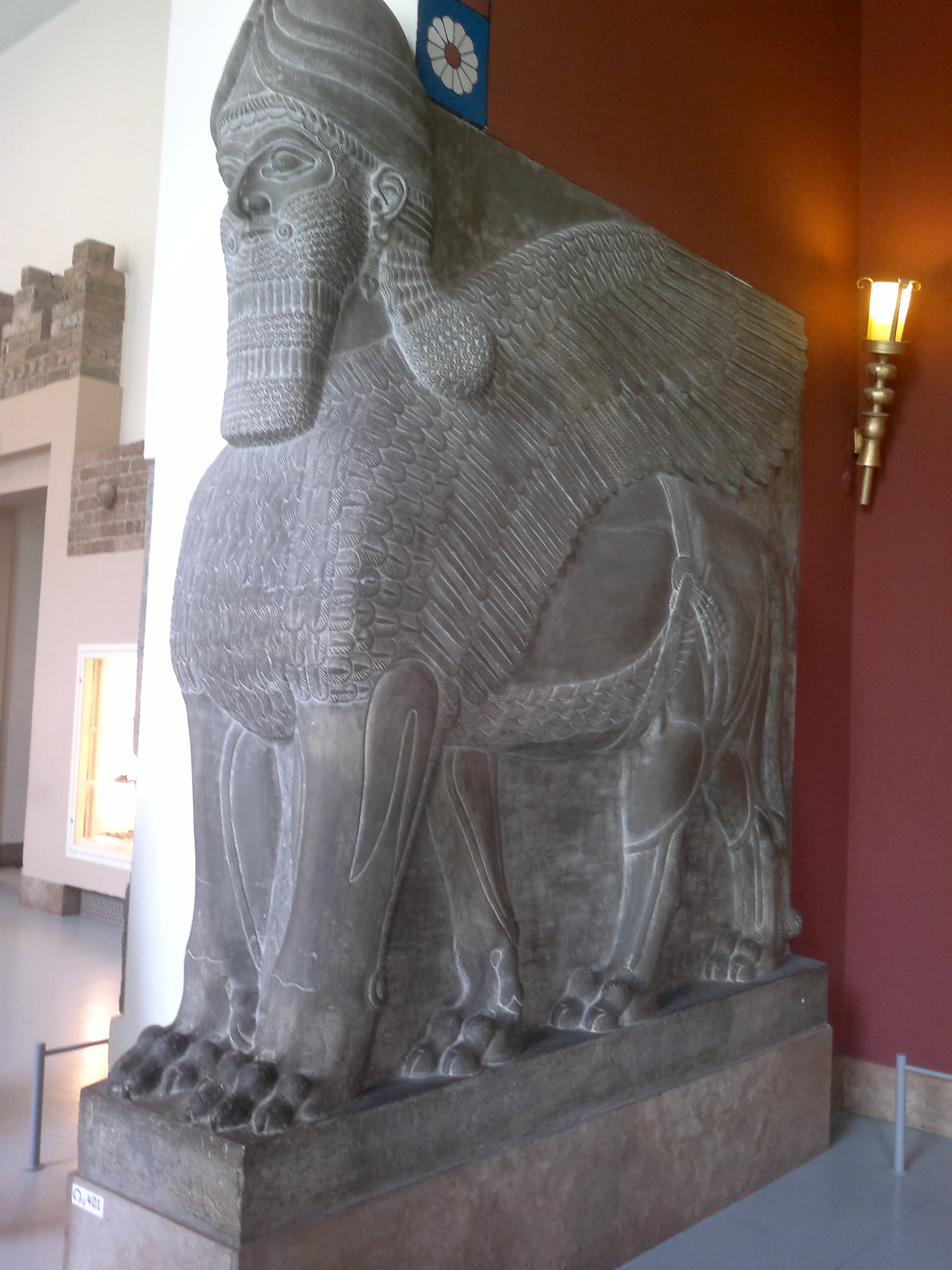
Cast from the original in Iraq, this is one of a pair of five-legged lamassu with lion's feet in Berlin

Lamassu represent the zodiacs, parent-stars, or constellations. They are depicted as protective deities because they encompass all life within them. In the Sumerian Epic of Gilgamesh, they are depicted as physical deities as well, which is where the lamassu iconography originates, physical representations or embodiments of divine higher principles associated with specific celestial origins. Although lamassu had a different iconography and portrayal in the culture of Sumer, the terms "lamassu", "alad", and "shedu" evolved throughout the Assyro-Akkadian culture from the Sumerian culture to denote the Assyrian-winged-man-bull symbol and statues during the Neo-Assyrian Empire. Eventually, female lamassu were identified as "apsasû".

The motif of the Assyrian-winged-man-bull called Aladlammu and Lamassu interchangeably is not the lamassu or alad of Sumerian origin, which were depicted with different iconography. These monumental statues were called aladlammû or lamassu which meant "protective spirit". In Hittite, the Sumerian form ^{d}lamma is used both as a name for the so-called "tutelary deity", identified in certain later texts with the goddess Inara, and a title given to similar protective deities.

== Mythology ==
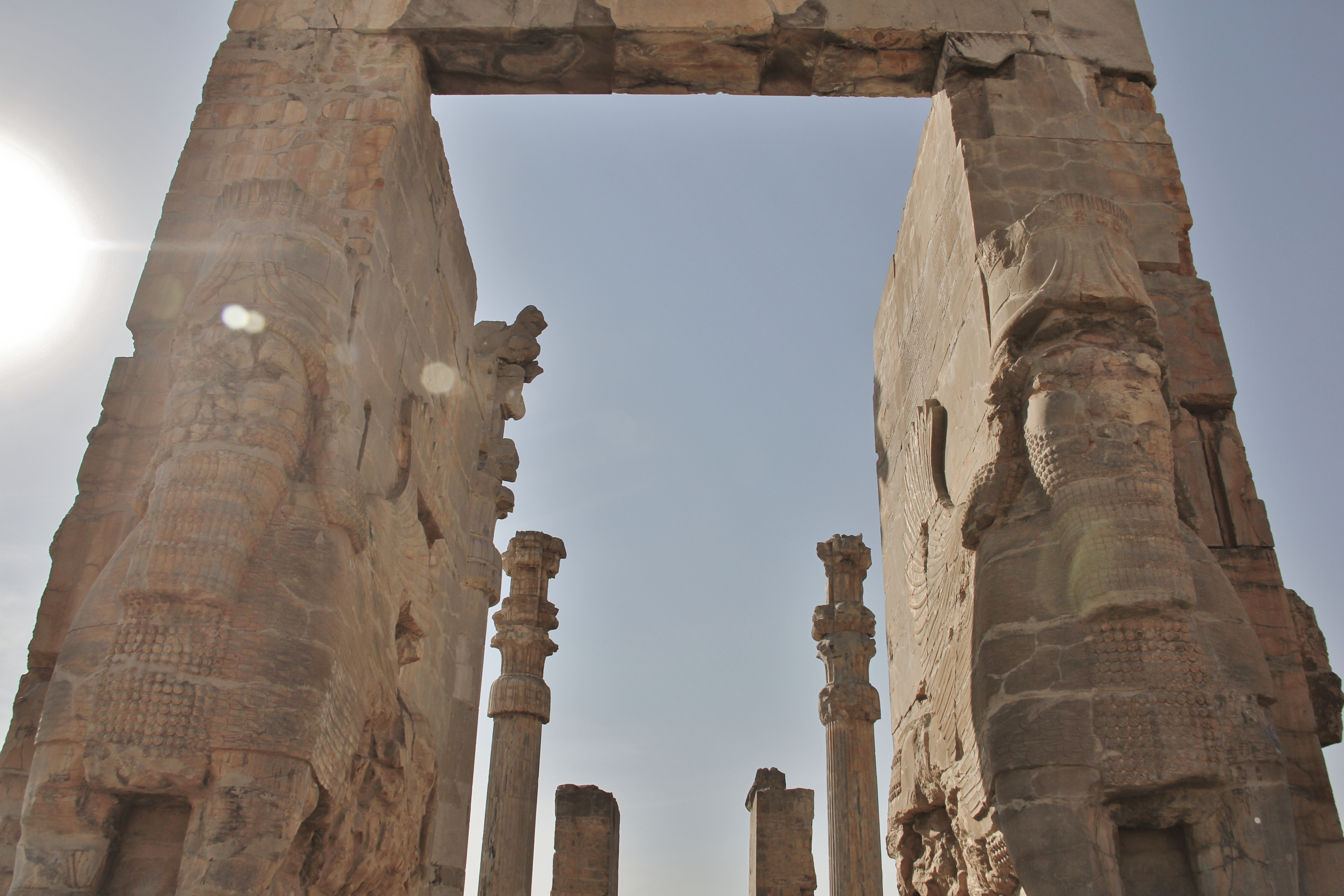
The lumasi in Gate of All Nations, Persepolis

The lamassu is a celestial being from ancient Mesopotamian religion bearing a human head, symbolising intelligence; a bull's body, symbolizing strength; and an eagle's wings, symbolizing freedom. Sometimes it had the horns and the ears of a bull. It appears frequently in Mesopotamian art. The lamassu and shedu were household protective spirits of the common Assyrian people, becoming associated later as royal protectors, and were placed as sentinels at entrances. The Akkadians associated the god Papsukkal with a lamassu and the god Išum with shedu.

To protect houses, the lamassu were engraved in clay tablets, which were then buried under the door's threshold. They were often placed as a pair at the entrance of palaces. At the entrance of cities, they were sculpted in colossal size, and placed as a pair, one at each side of the door of the city, that generally had doors in the surrounding wall, each one looking toward one of the cardinal points.

== In modern culture ==
The lamassu is also often used by the modern Assyrian people as a representation of their shared identity and ancient ancestry.

Artist Michael Rakowitz was commissioned to recreate the lamassu of Nineveh, dated to 700 BC, that was destroyed by IS in 2015. Rakowitz's sculpture was displayed in London's Trafalgar Square from 2018 to 2020.

The lamassu has been used in the iconography of several military and police forces, including the British 10th Army, the United States Forces – Iraq, and the SAVAK of Iran.

== Gallery ==
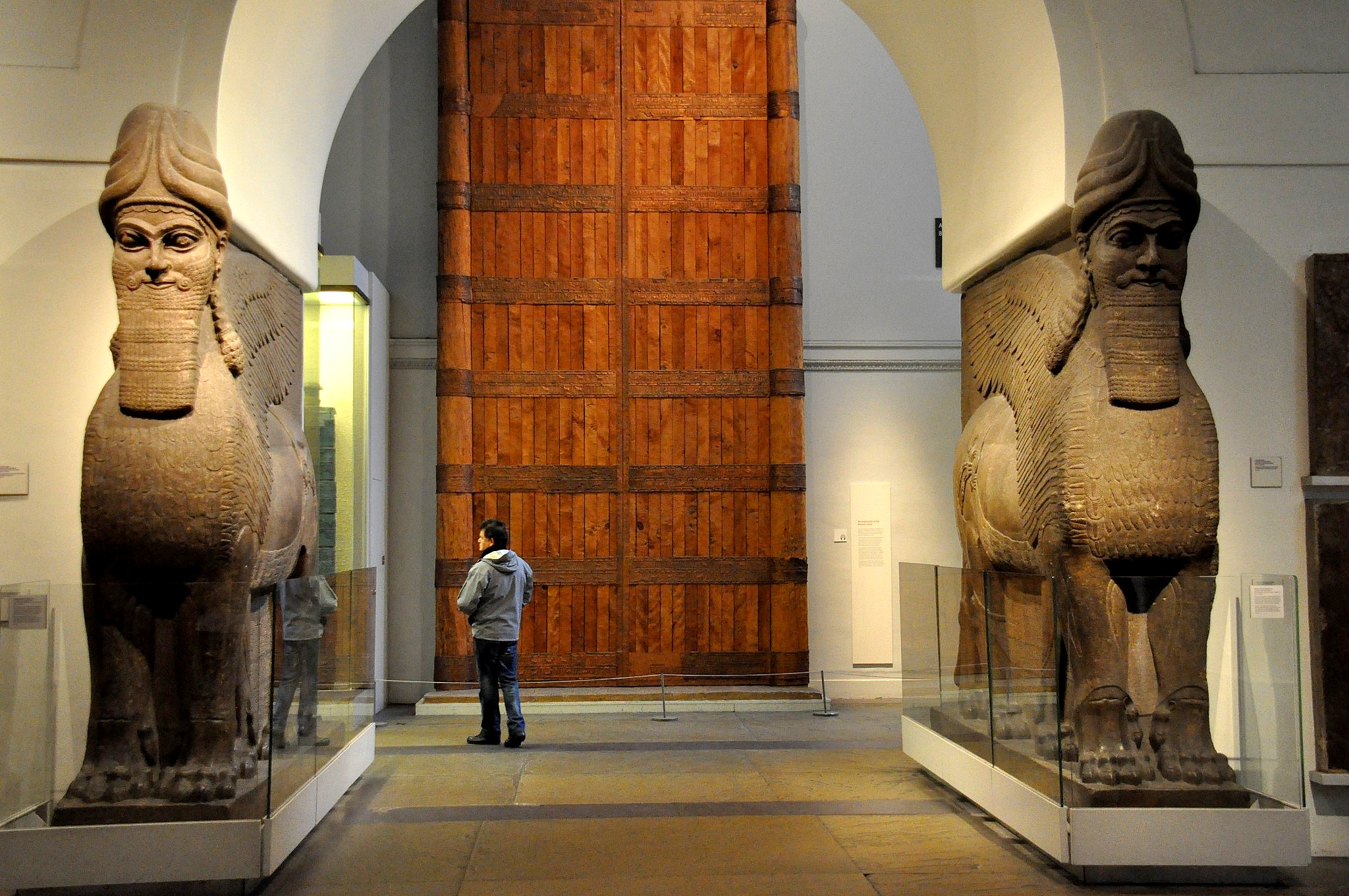
The British Museum – human-headed winged lions and reliefs from Nimrud with the Balawat Gates

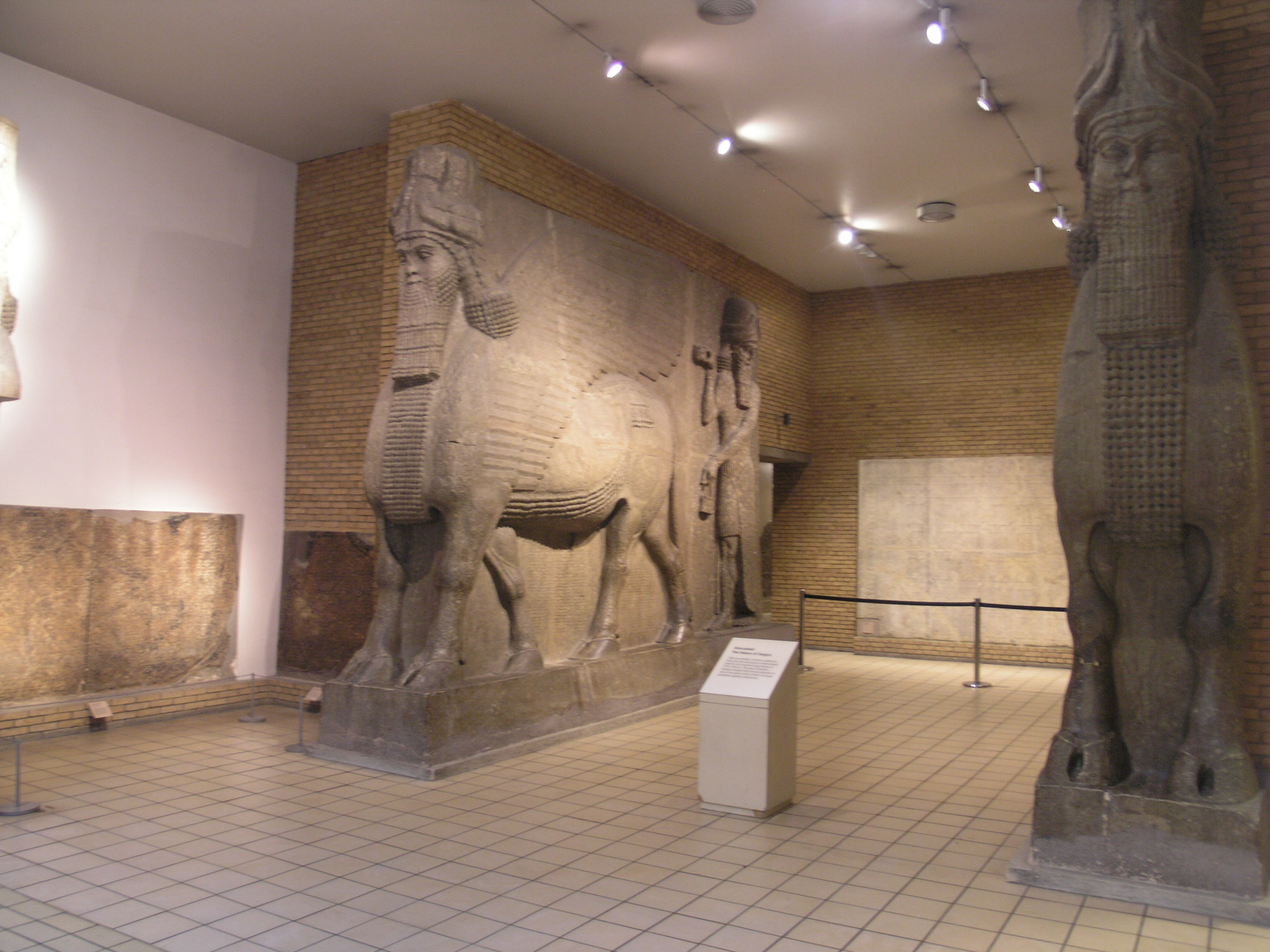
The British Museum – human-headed winged bulls from Dur-Sharrukin

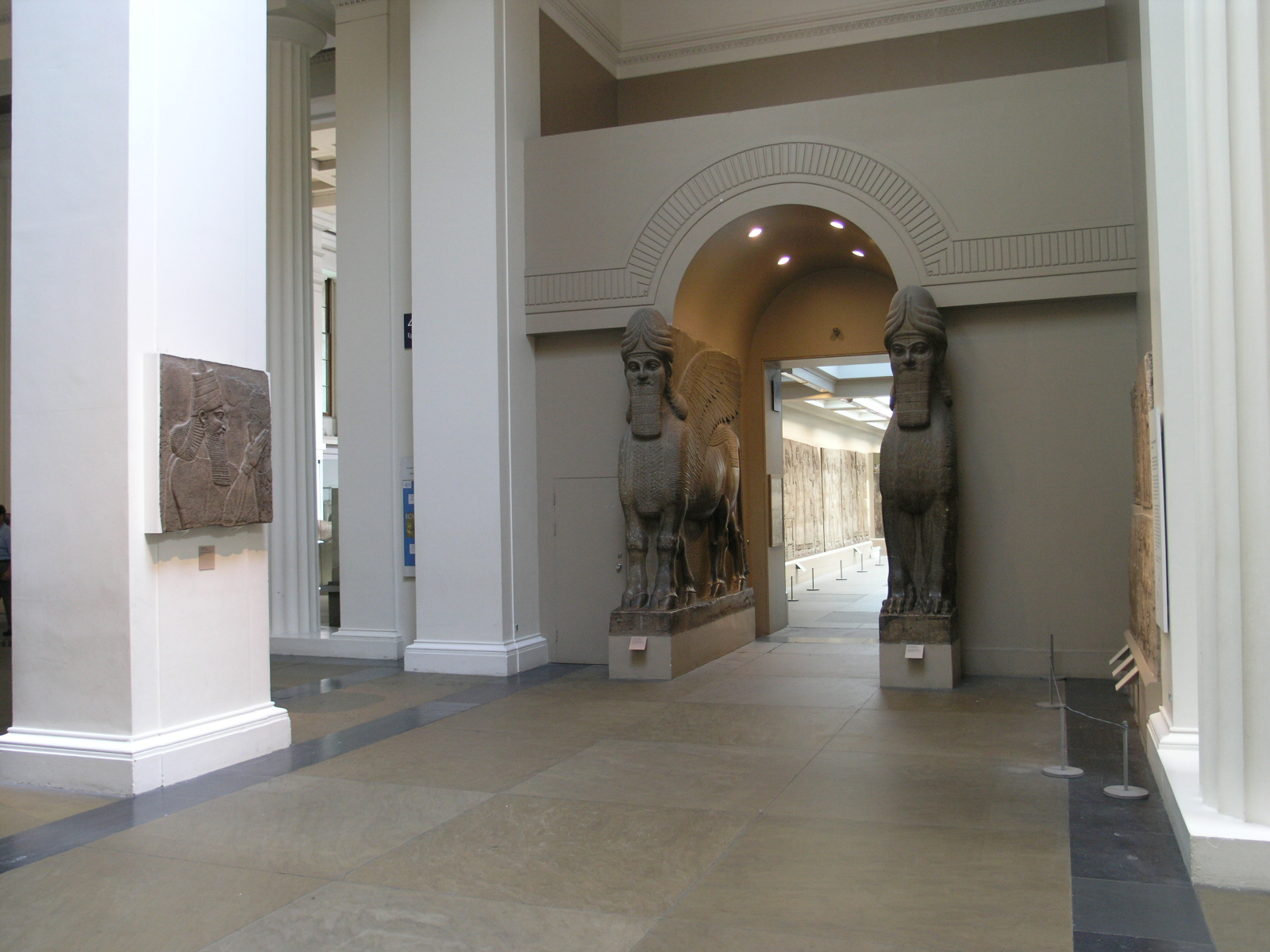
The British Museum – human-headed winged lion and bull from Nimrud, companion pieces in Metropolitan Museum of Art

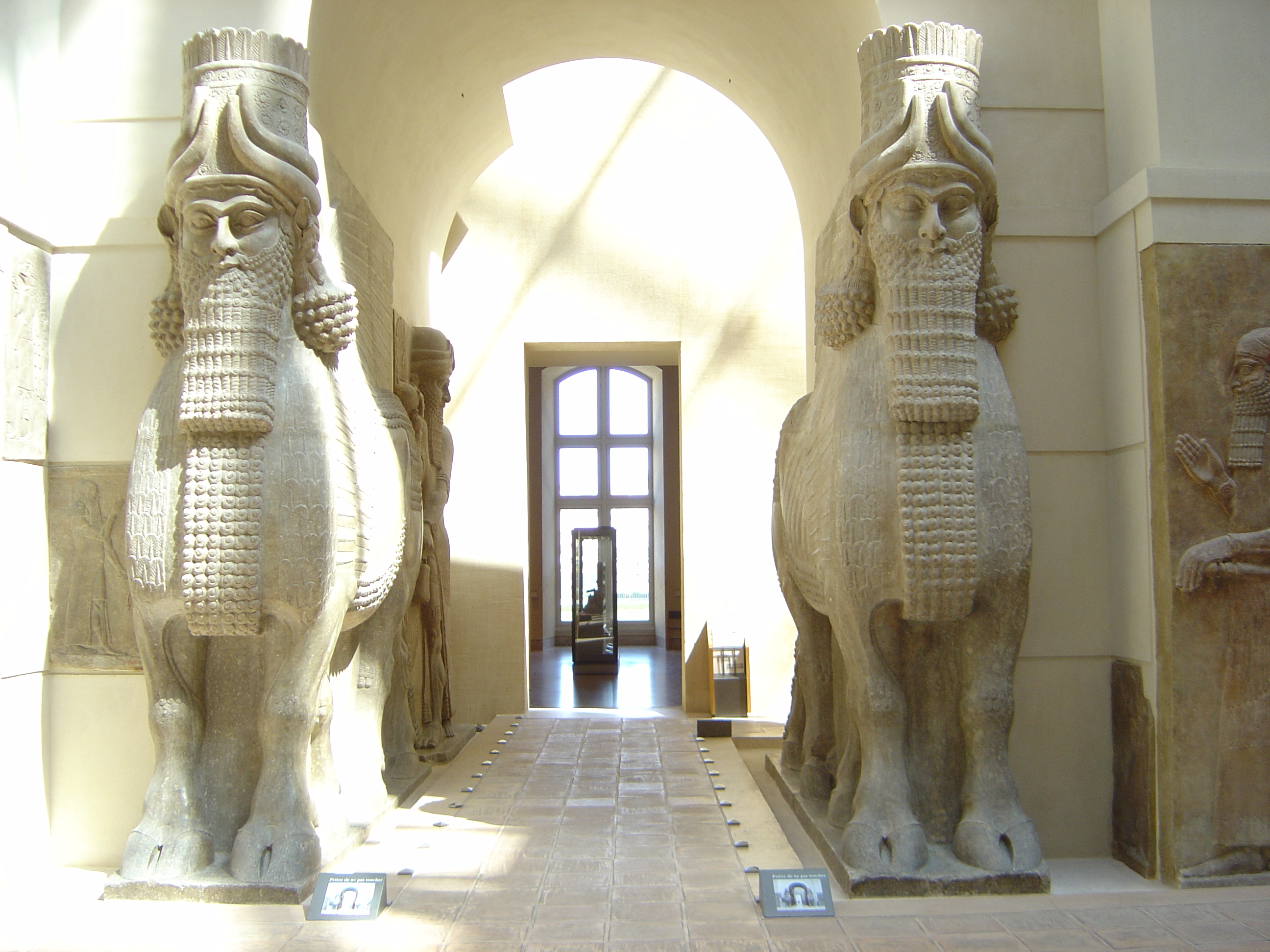
Louvre – human-headed winged bulls from Dur-Sharrukin

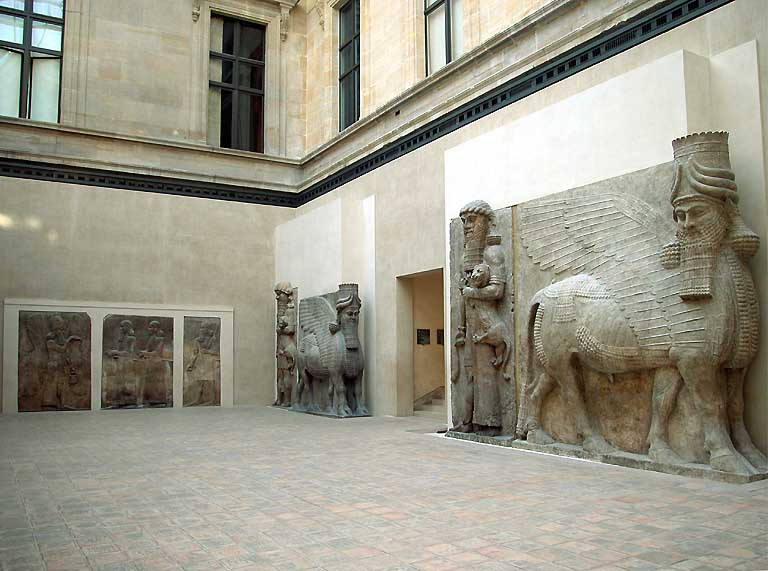
Louvre – human-headed winged bulls, sculpture and reliefs from Dur-Sharrukin

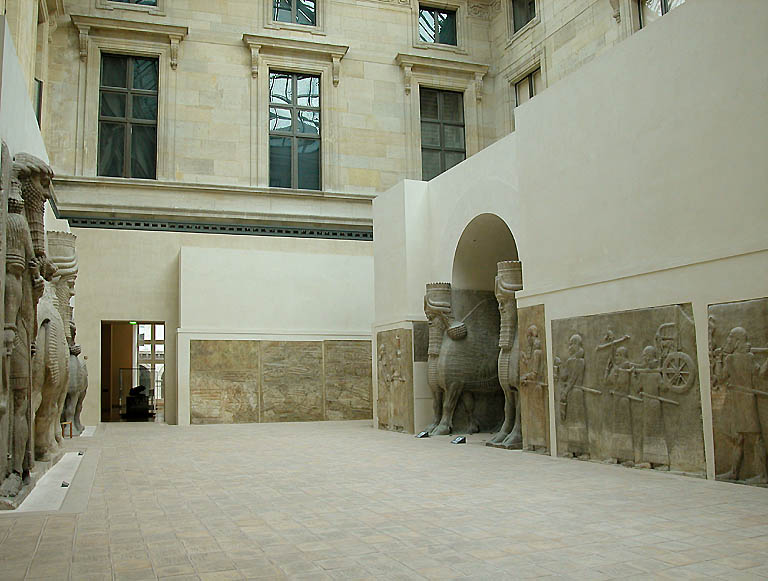
Louvre – human-headed winged bulls and reliefs from Dur-Sharrukin, in their wider setting of reliefs

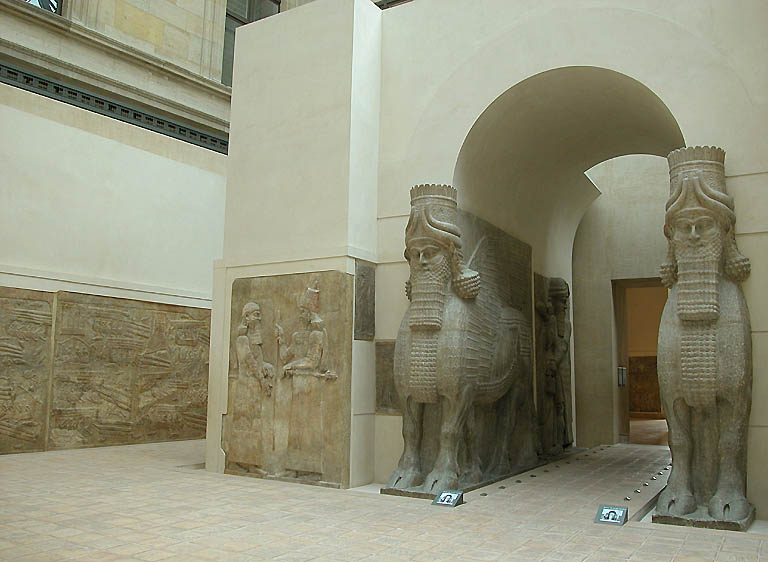
Louvre – human-headed winged bulls and reliefs from Dur-Sharrukin

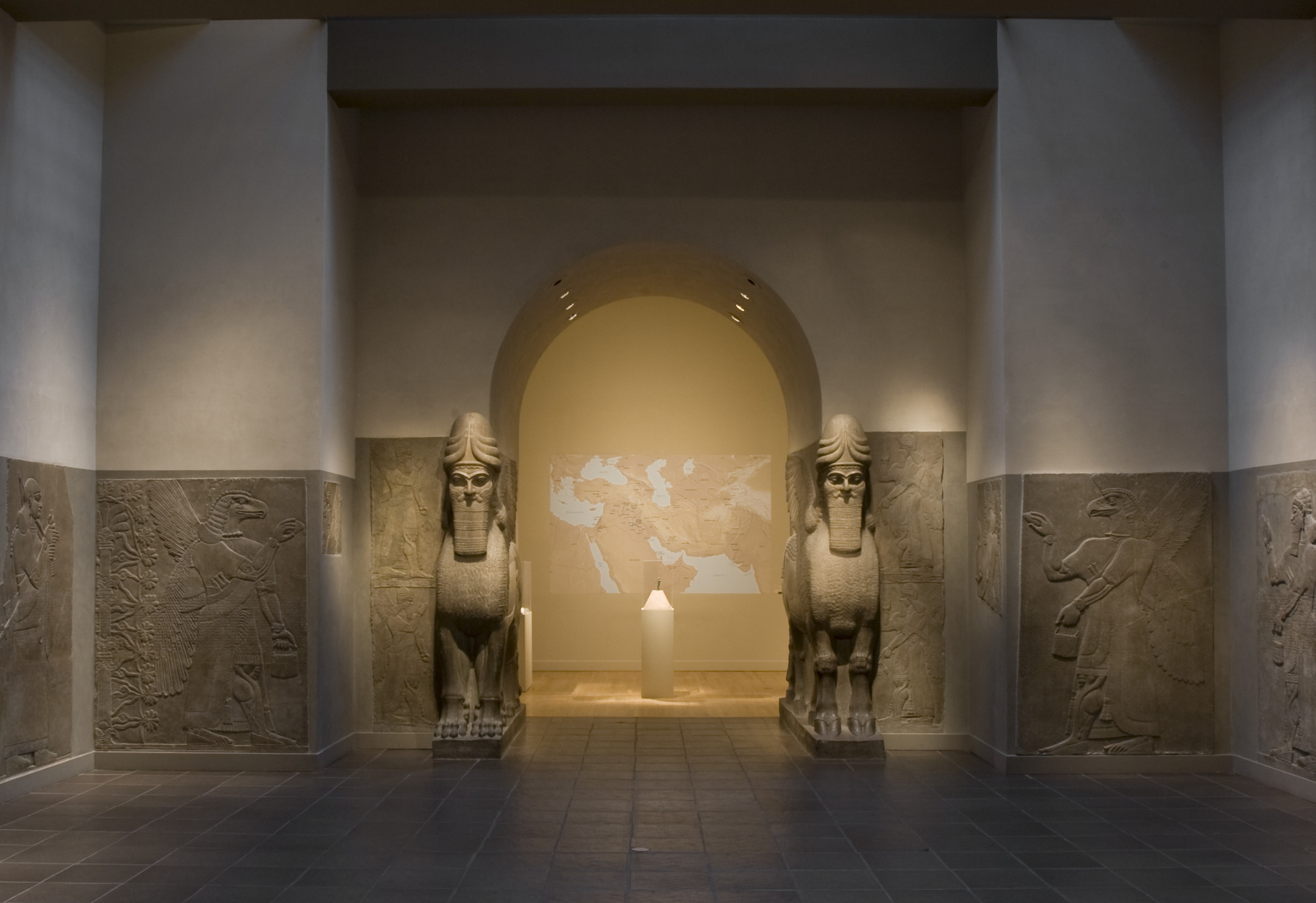
The Metropolitan Museum of Art – human-headed winged lion and bull from Nimrud, companion pieces to those in the British Museum, London

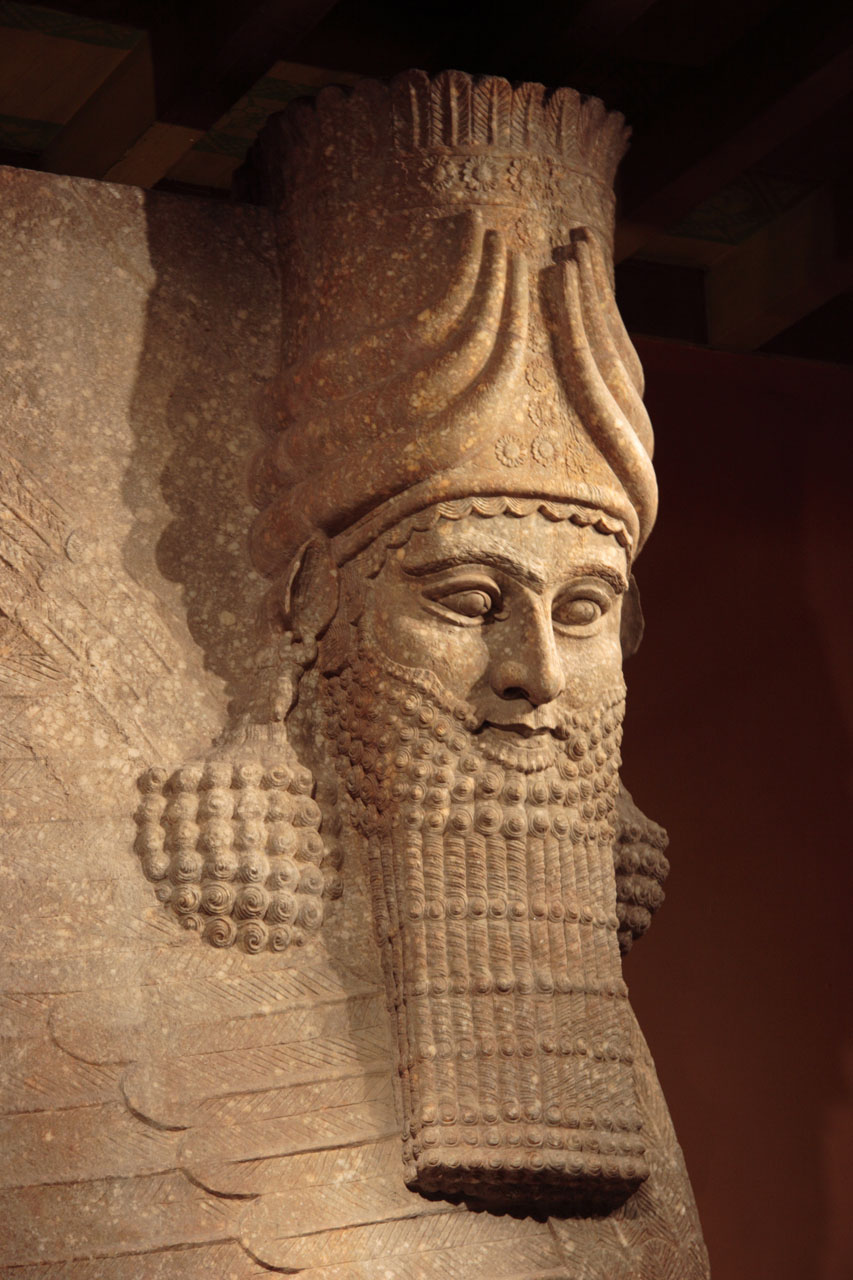
Detail, Institute for the Study of Ancient Cultures. Possibly gypsum, Dur-Sharrukin, entrance to the throne room, c. 721–705 BC

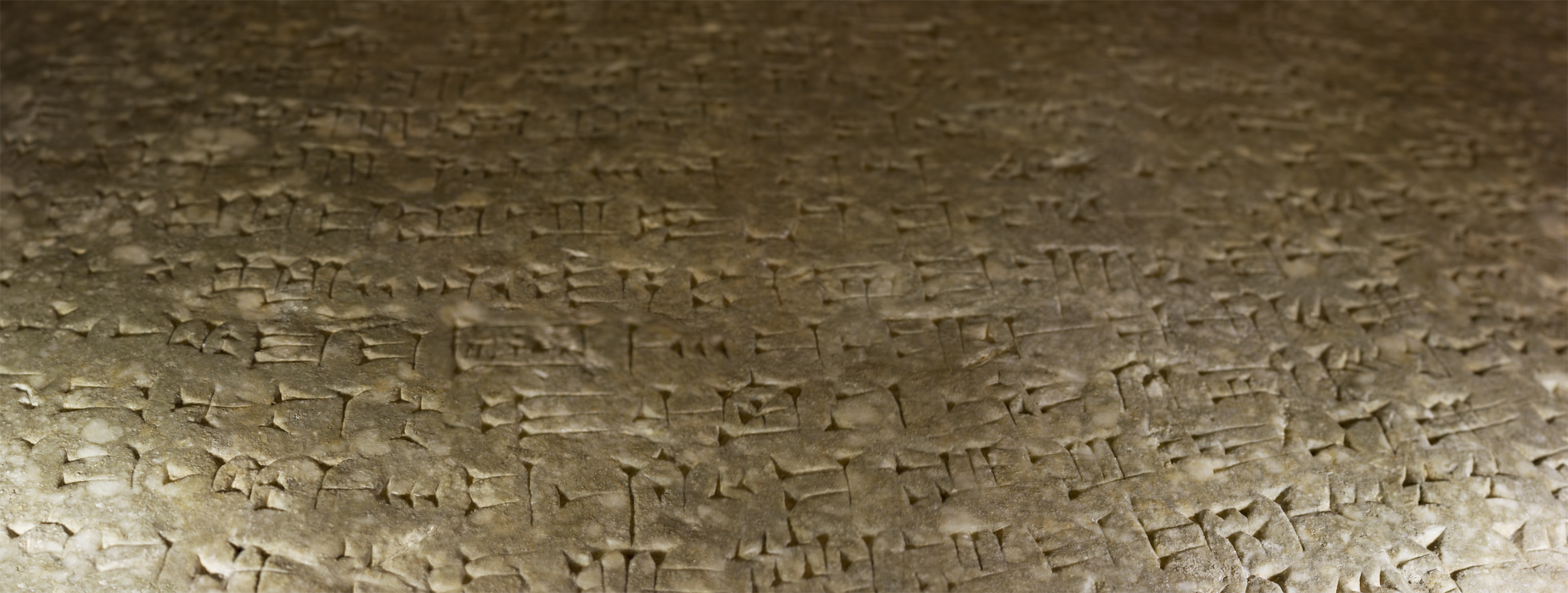
Cuneiform script on the back of a lamassu in the University of Chicago Institute for the Study of Ancient Cultures

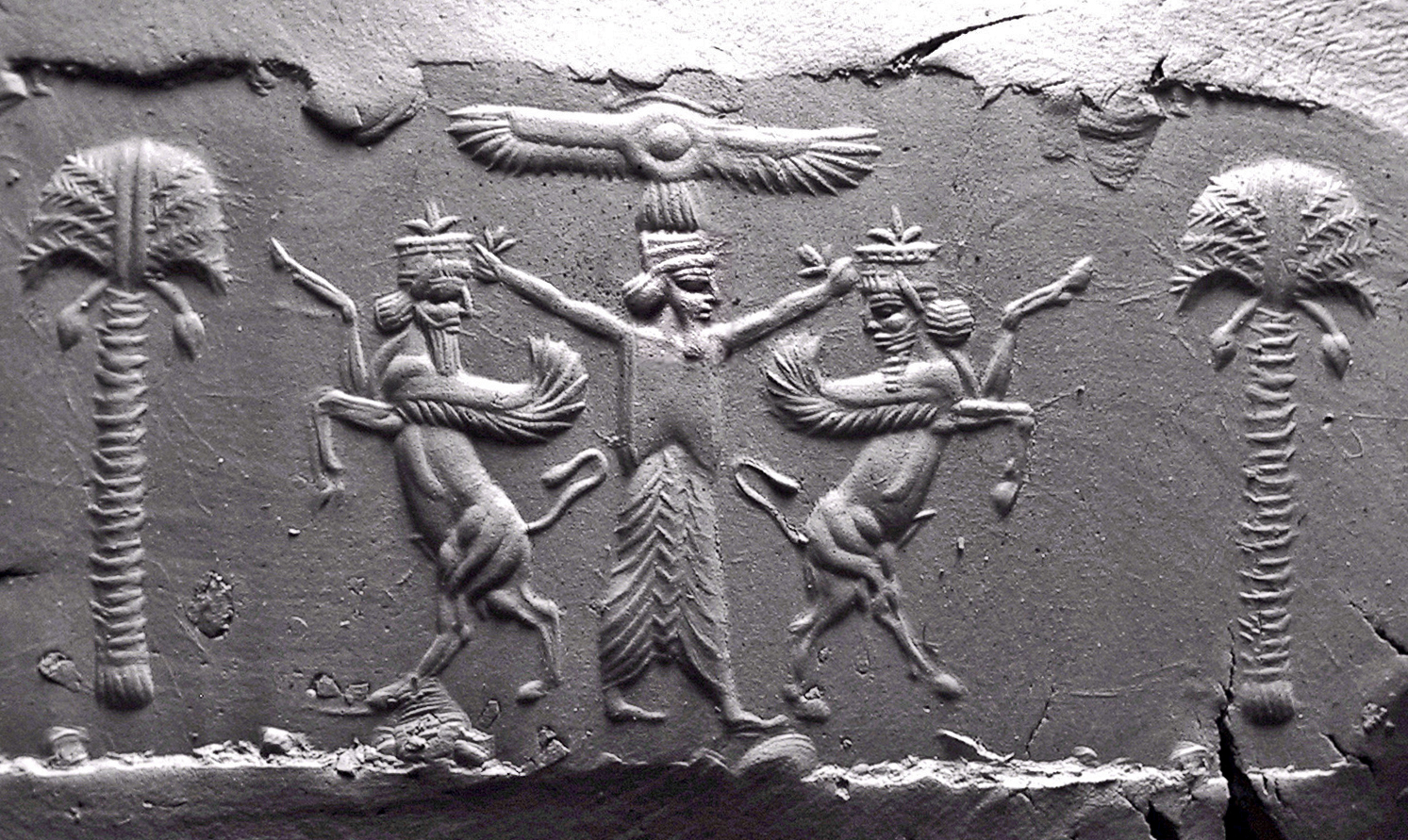
Modern impression of Achaemenid cylinder seal, fifth century BC. A winged solar disc legitimises the Achaemenid emperor, who subdues two rampant Mesopotamian lamassu figures

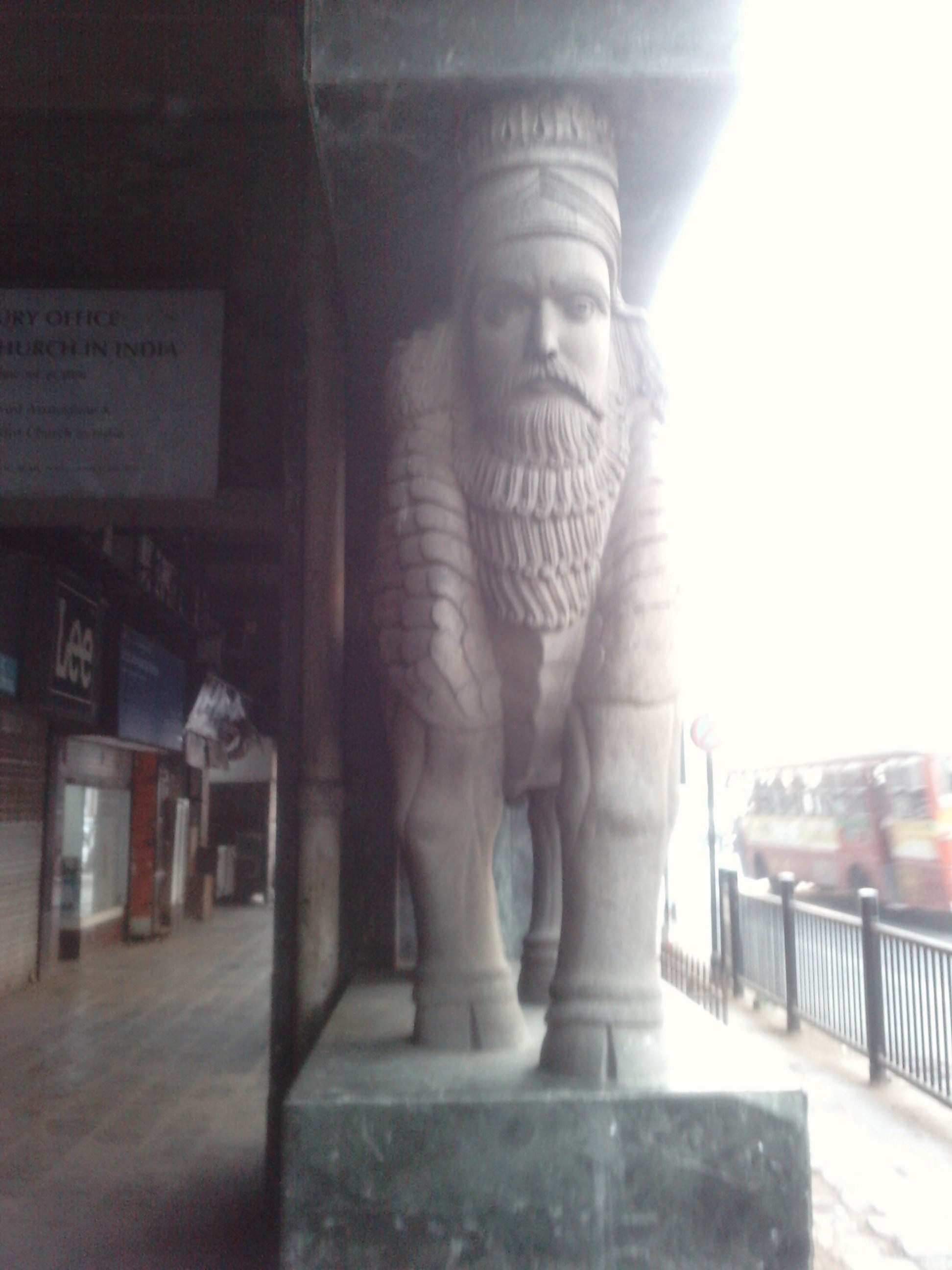
The entrance of a fire temple in Fort Mumbai displaying a lamassu

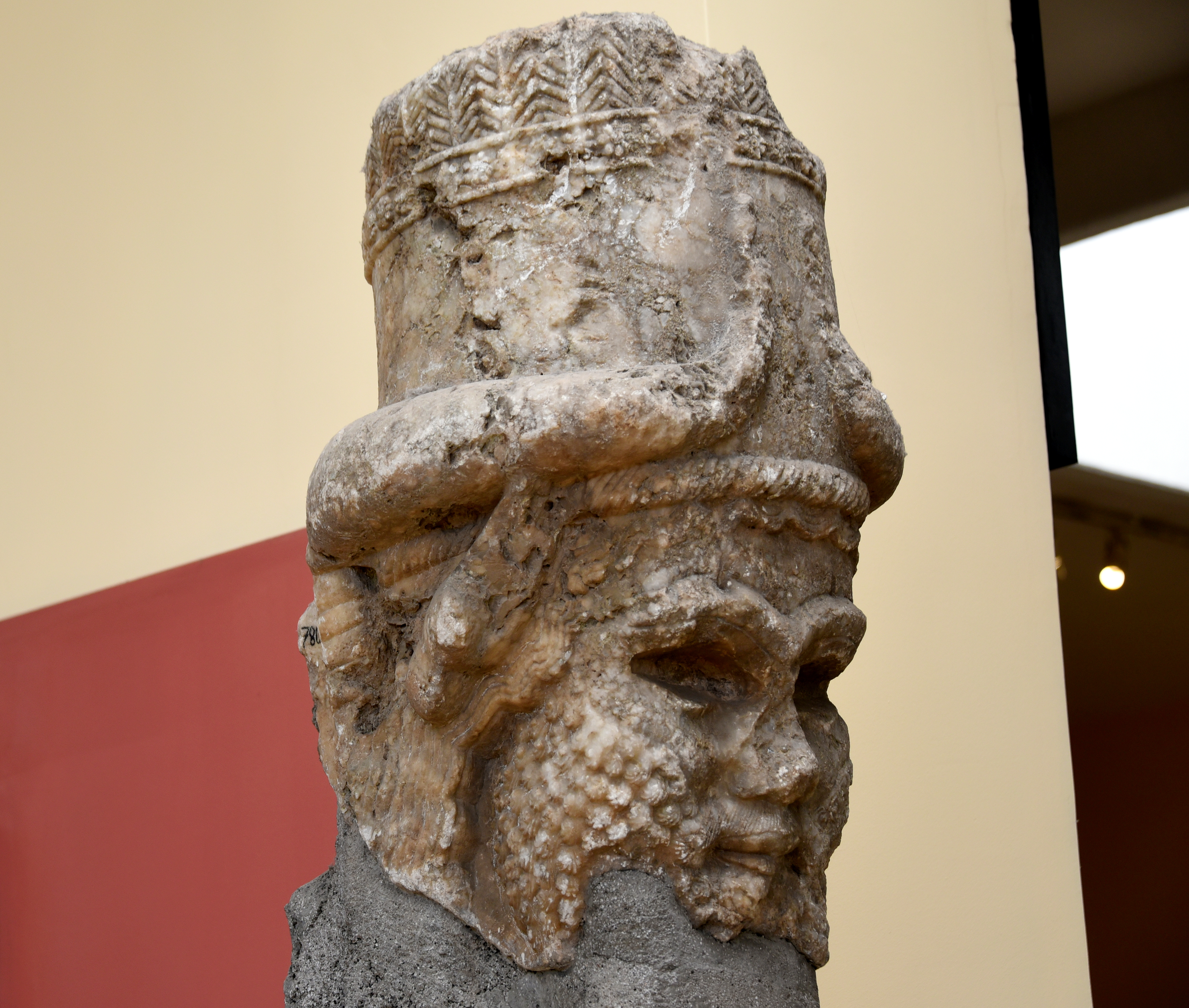
Head of lamassu. Marble, eighth century BC, from Assur. Museum of the Ancient Orient, Istanbul

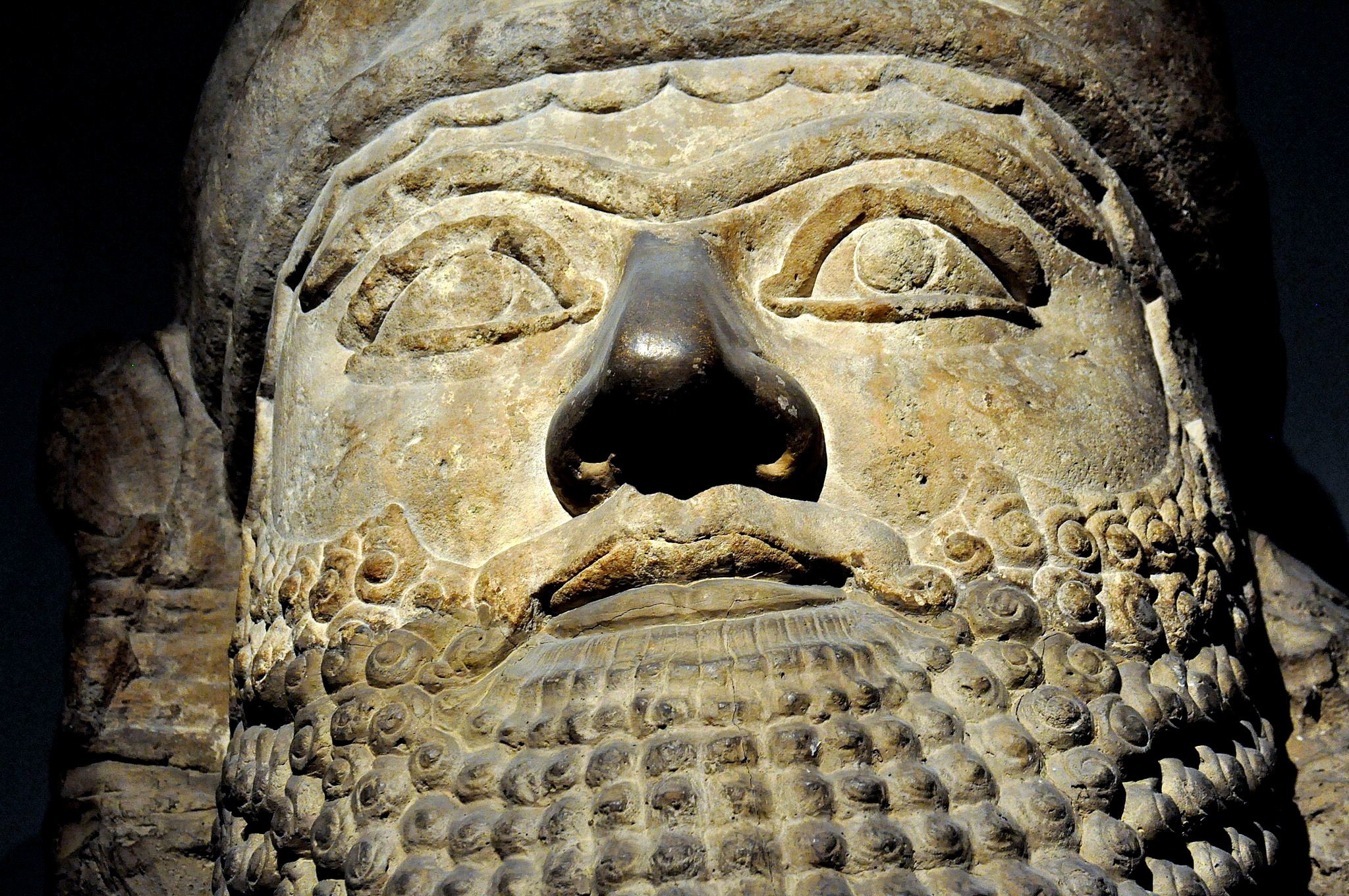
Head of a lamassu from the palace of Esarhaddon, from Nimrud, seventh century BC, the British Museum

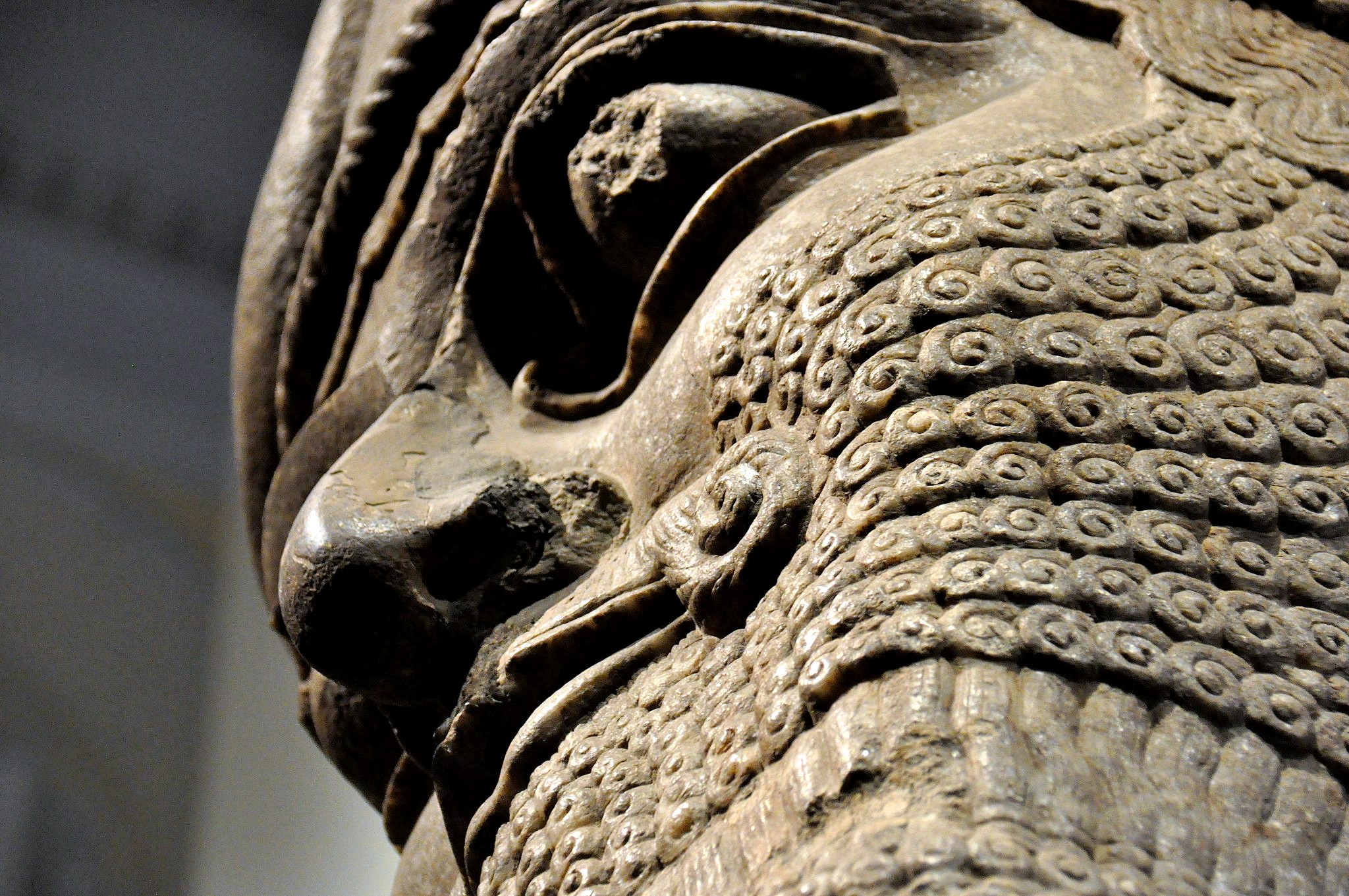
Lamassu from the Throne Room (Room B) of the North-West Palace at Nimrud, ninth century BC, the British Museum

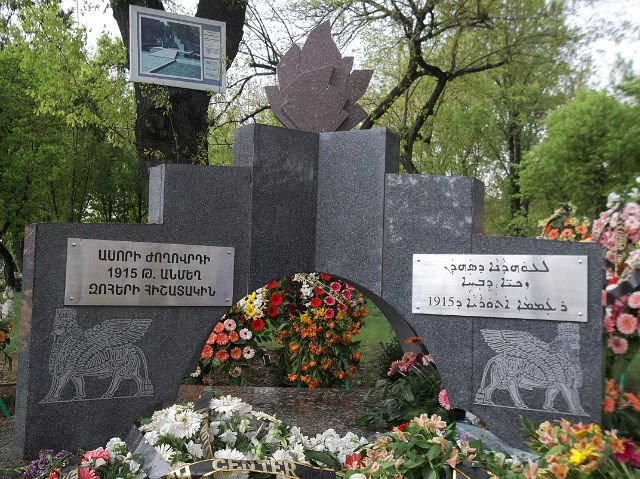
Lamassu on an Assyrian Genocide memorial in Yerevan

== See also ==
- Mythological hybrid
- List of hybrid creatures in mythology
- Anzû (older reading: Zû), Mesopotamian monster
- Apis, Ancient Egyptian religion deity anthropomorphic bull
- Buraq, Islamic mythological human torso-equine body hybrid
- Centaur, Greek mythological human torso-equine body hybrid
- Cherubim, Abrahamic religious celestial human-winged hybrid
- Chimera, Greek mythological hybrid monster
- Enlil, ancient Mesopotamian deity: patriarch deity of supreme universal strength
- Griffin or griffon, lion-bird hybrid
- Harpy, Greek mythological hybrid human torso-bird body hybrid
- Jinn, pre-Islamic Arabian celestial beings, human-winged hybrid
- Kamadhenu, Hindu bovine goddess
- Lakhmu, Akkadian deity also known as Lammasu
- Lamashtu, ancient Mesopotamian female demons
- Manticore, Persian sphinx-like creature
- Mermaid, European, Asian, and African folklore, female human torso-fish tail hybrid
- Minotaur, Greek mythology: bull-man hybrid
- Mušḫuššu, Mesopotamian dragon
- Pamola, the Abenaki-origin indigenous American "winged-moose" spirit protecting Mount Katahdin
- Pegasus, winged stallion in Greek mythology
- Sharabha, Hindu mythology: lion-bird hybrid
- Simurgh, Iranian mythical flying creature
- Sphinx, mythical creature with a lion's body and human head
- Thunderbird, mythological bird-like spirit in North American indigenous peoples' mythology
- Yali, Hindu mythological lion-elephant-horse hybrid
- Ziz, giant griffin-like bird in Jewish mythology
