= Jeanne-Marie Aynard =

French Assyriologist and philologist

- Born: September 19, 1907; Paris, France
- Died: January 24, 2002; Laxou, France

Academic background
- Education: University of Paris; École du Louvre; École pratique des hautes études

Academic work
- Discipline: Assyriology

Jeanne-Marie Aynard, sometimes nicknamed Sam, born in Paris on September 19, 1907, and died in Laxou on January 24, 2002, was a French Assyriologist and philologist.

== Biography ==
She was born into a bourgeois Parisian family on September 19, 1907. Her full name was Henriette Jeanne-Marie Aynard. Jeanne-Marie resided in the 15th arrondissement of Paris, 1 Boulevard Montmorency. She won a radio music contest in 1927 organized by L'Écho de Paris.

She pursued two bachelor's degrees simultaneously, one in law and the other in history, at the University of Paris. In 1935, she took the oath and joined the Paris bar. However, this did not suit her, and she decided to turn to Assyriology. She then attended the courses of Georges Contenau, André Parrot at the École du Louvre, and those of Jean Nougayrol and René Labat at the École pratique des hautes études (EPHE).

From 1947 onwards, she became a technical collaborator with Jean Nougayrol at the CNRS and collaborated with Agnès Spycket, particularly in the management of the Assyrian collections at the Louvre. She temporarily left Assyriology to become a journalist for L’Économie, but she quickly returned to Assyriology. Within French orientalist scientific circles, she was nicknamed Sam, although the origin of such a nickname is not clear.

In 1957, she defended her thesis at the EPHE, focusing on the prism F of Assurbanipal, an object from the Louvre collections. She collaborated with Adolf Leo Oppenheim on the interpretation of dreams in the ancient Near East. Aynard also worked on the topic of the afterlife in Mesopotamian thought.

She died on January 24, 2002, in Laxou, Meurthe-et-Moselle.

== Legacy ==
Serge Lebovici used her works as a source for his reflections on psychoanalysis.
