= Agnès Spycket =

French archaeologist (1921–2022)

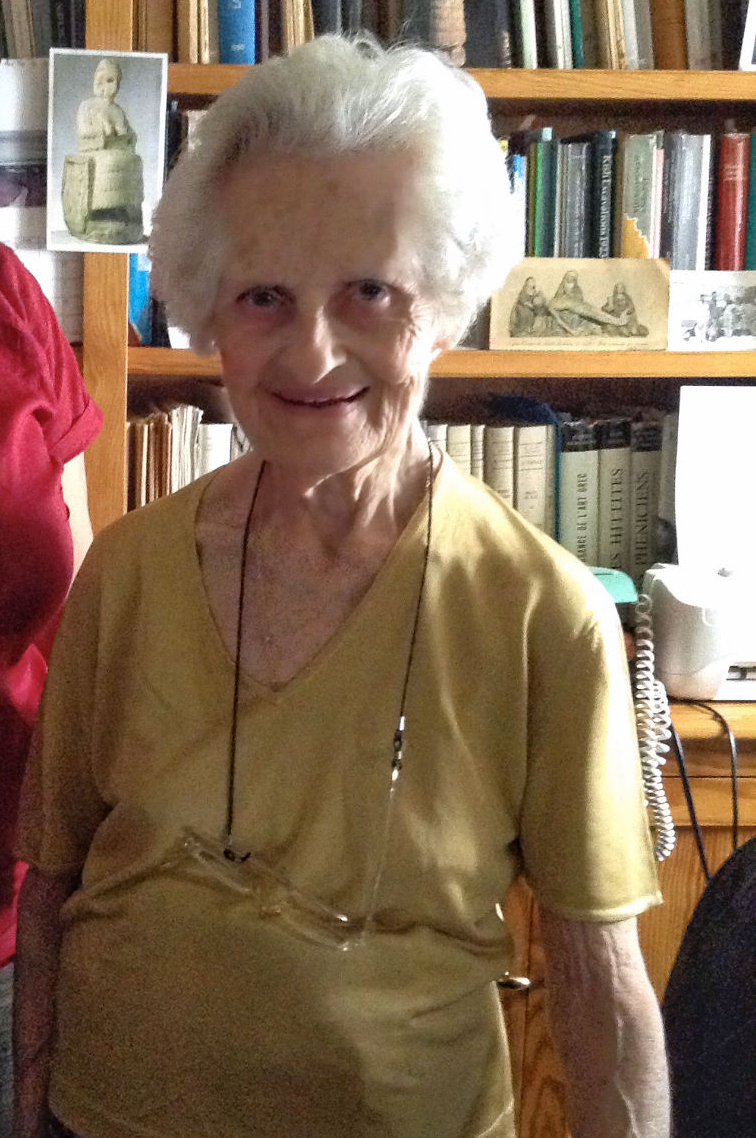
- Born: 1 September 1921; Paris, France
- Died: 17 January 2022 (aged 100); Paris, France
- Awards: CNRS Silver Medal; Ordre des Arts et des Lettres

Academic background
- Education: Catholic University of Paris; École pratique des hautes études École du Louvre
- Thesis: La statue de culte en Mésopotamie; La coiffure féminine en Mésopotamie

Academic work
- Discipline: Assyriology; Archaeology
- Institutions: Louvre; French National Centre for Scientific Research

Agnès Spycket (1 September 1921 – 17 January 2022) was a French Assyriologist, iconologist, and archaeologist.

== Biography ==
Spycket was born on 1 September 1921 in Paris. After being "captivated" by Assyrian bulls at the Louvre at the age of 19, she pursued studies at the Catholic University of Paris, followed by EPHE (École Pratique des Hautes Études), and the École du Louvre.

There, she learned Hebrew, Akkadian, and Sumerian. She presented her thesis titled "La coiffure féminine en Mésopotamie" (Women's Hairstyles in Mesopotamia) under the guidance of Georges Contenau and André Parrot in 1946. Later, she undertook a dissertation at EPHE titled "La statue de culte en Mésopotamie" (Cult Statues in Mesopotamia). However, she only presented it twenty years later with the assistance of Roland de Vaux, overcoming numerous obstacles in her academic career due to gender-related challenges.

Simultaneously, she started as a mission officer within the Department of Oriental Antiquities at the Louvre in 1945. At the same time, she joined the CNRS (National Center for Scientific Research) as a technical associate under Édouard Dhorme and René Labat. She was also in link with another female assyriologist of that time, Jeanne-Marie Aynard, with whom she worked.

Spycket actively participated in numerous excavations. In 1962–1963, she conducted excavations in Jerusalem with Roland de Vaux. Subsequently, she excavated at Susa with Roman Ghirshman from 1964 to 1966, and at Tell Keisan with Roland de Vaux in the 1970s. She also played a role in organizing and conducting excavations in places like Isin, Sirkeli, and Terqa. Roman Ghirshman, who worked with her on excavations, described her as particularly "sagacious".

Despite the challenges she faced in her career as a woman, Spycket received support from some friends and colleagues, including André Parrot. Among others, he advocated for her to receive the Order of Arts and Letters, declaring it to be :

The long-awaited and highly deserved consecration of tireless activity that you have carried out for years in the service of science.

In 1982, she was honoured with the CNRS Silver Medal for her contributions to Assyriology and iconology.

Spycket died on 17 January 2022, and was buried after a ceremony at the church of Sainte-Trinité, Paris.

== Legacy ==
In 1996, a collective work paid tribute to Agnès Spycket, expressing gratitude for her contribution to the understanding of the ancient Near East.

== Decorations ==
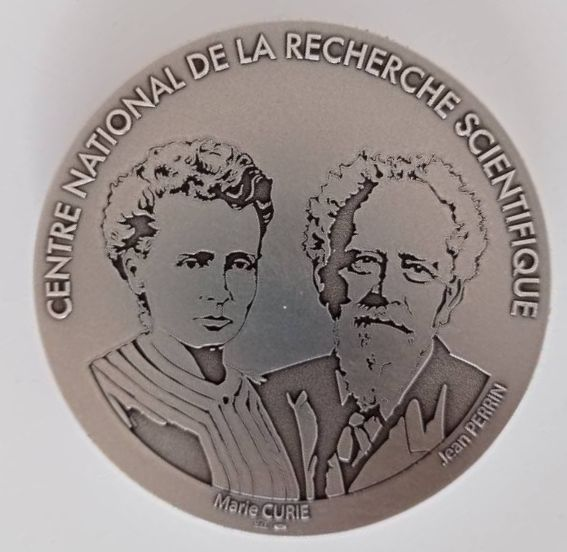
- CNRS Silver Medal (France)
- Knight of the Ordre des Arts et des Lettres (France)
