= Gate of All Nations =

Achaemenid-era structure in Persepolis, Iran

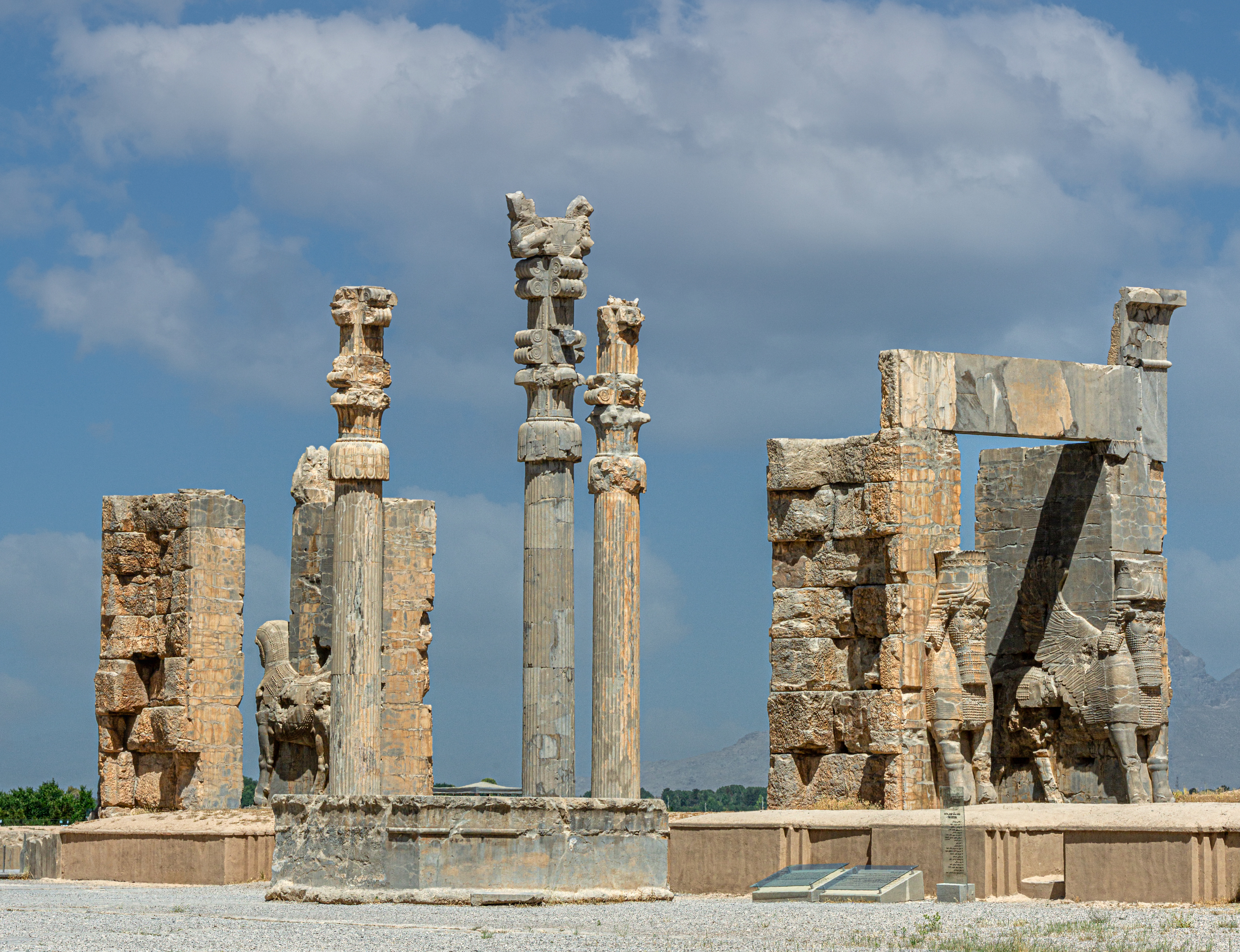
- View of the Gate of All Nations palace

Religion
- Province: Fars province
- Region: 70 km northeast of the modern city of Shiraz in the Fars Province of modern Iran

Location
- Location: Persepolis, Marvdasht, Iran
- Municipality: Marvdasht
- State: Marvdasht
- Interactive map of Gate of All Nations
- Sector: Persepolis
- Territory: Iran
- Coordinates: 29.934444°N 52.891389°E

Architecture
- Type: Achaemenid architecture
- Materials: Stone

Website
- https://whc.unesco.org/en/list/114

The Gate of All Nations (Old Persian: 𐎯𐎢𐎺𐎼𐎰𐎡𐎶𐏐𐎻𐎡𐎿𐎭𐏃𐎹𐎢𐎶, romanized: duvarϑim visadahyum), also known as the Gate of Xerxes, is located in the ruins of the ancient city of Persepolis, Iran.

The construction of the Stairs of All Nations and the Gate of All Nations was ordered by the Achaemenid king Xerxes I (486–465 BCE), the successor of the founder of Persepolis, Darius I the Great.

== Building ==
It is from an inscription in the gate, known as the XPa inscription, that the building is known as the Gate of All Nations, constructed under the reign of Xerxes I.

== Gallery ==
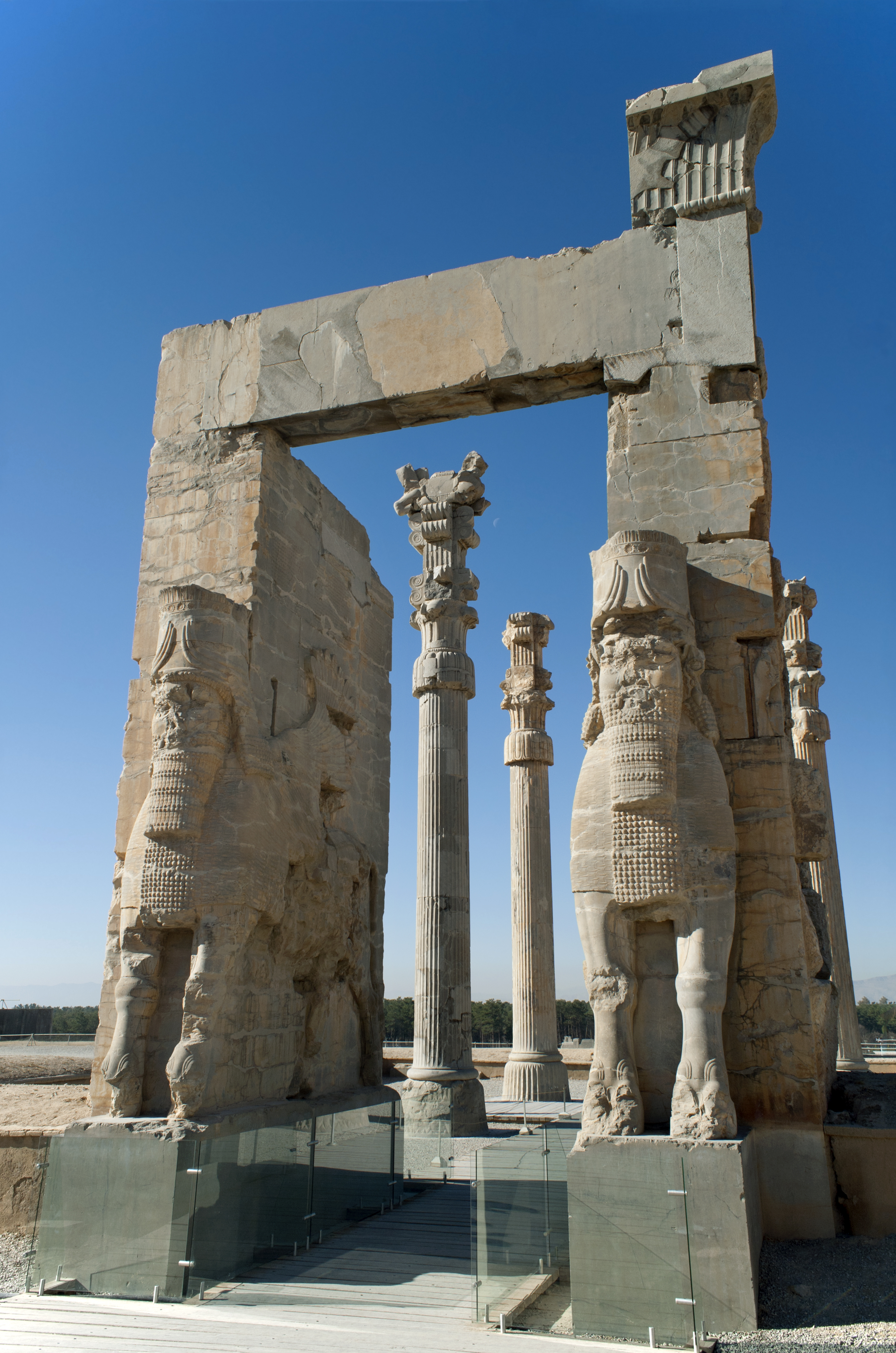
View of front

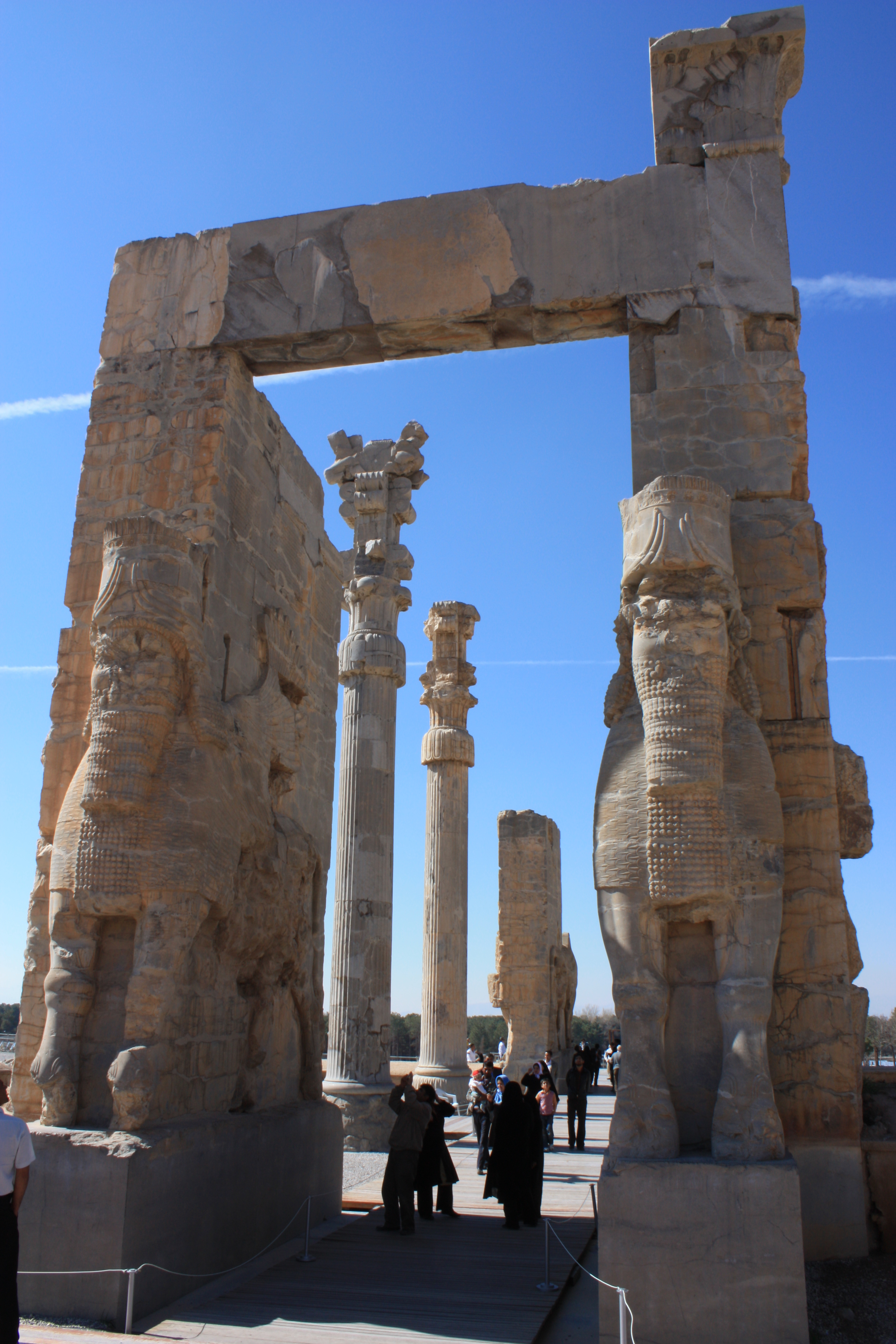
View with visitors

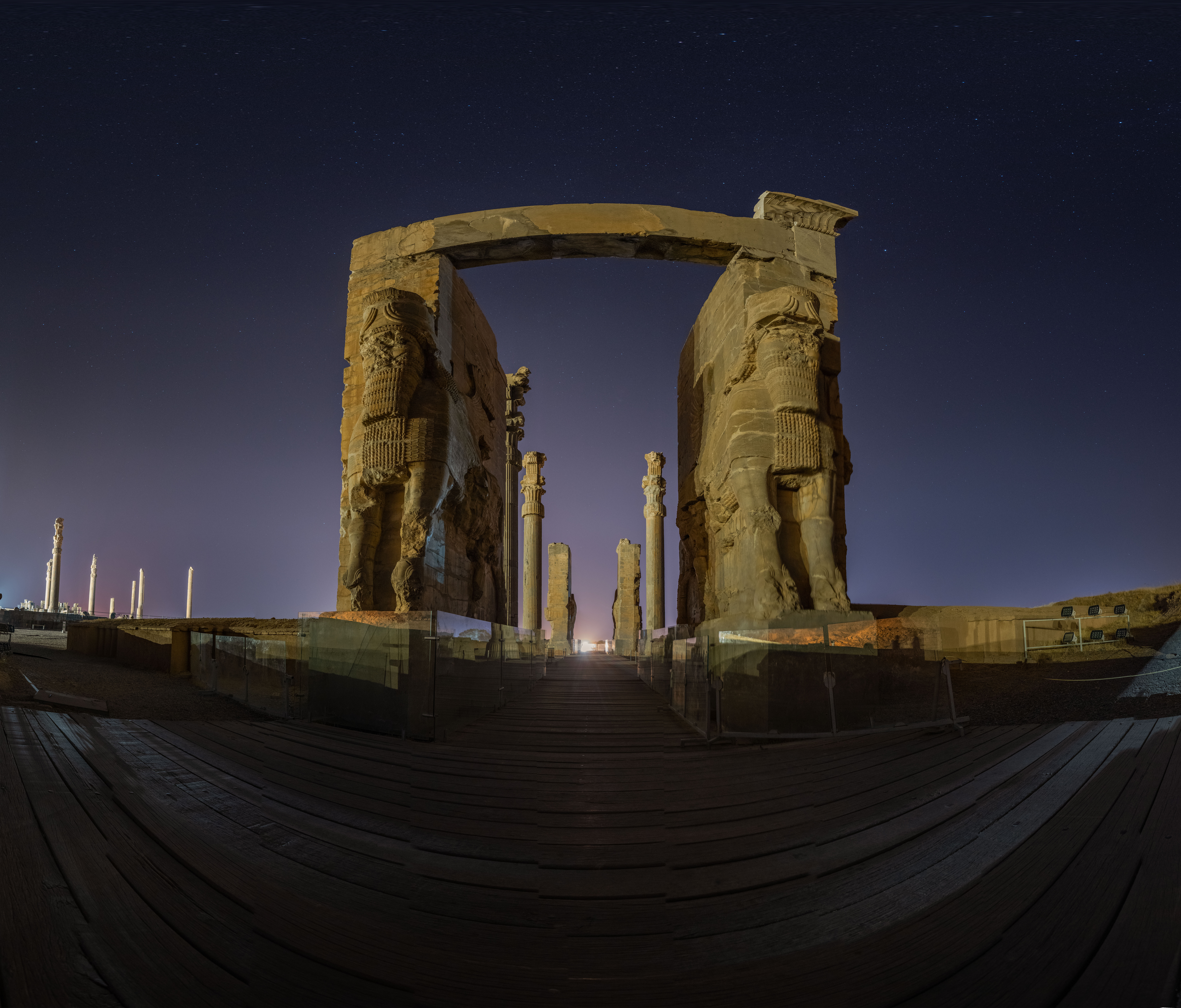

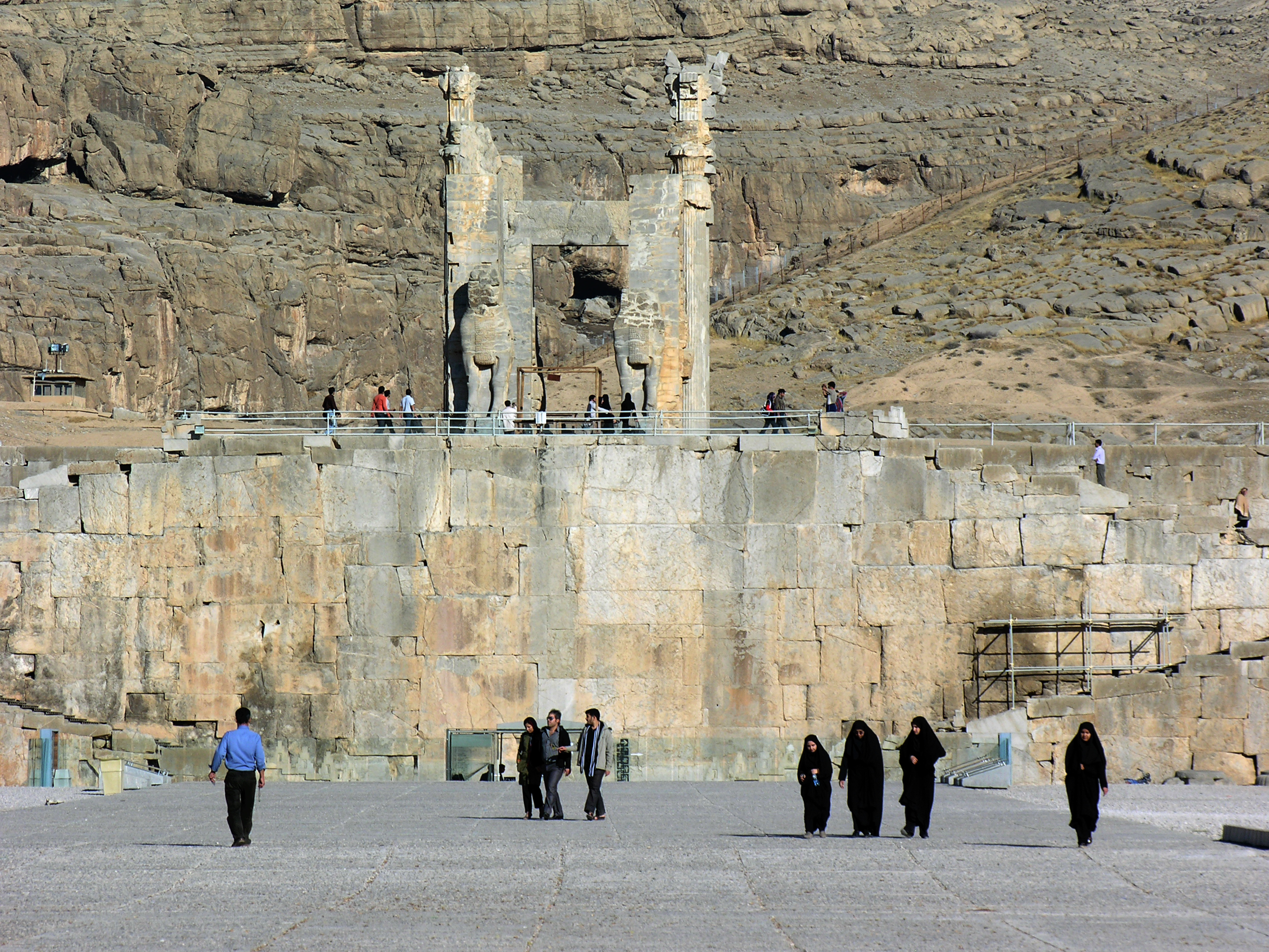

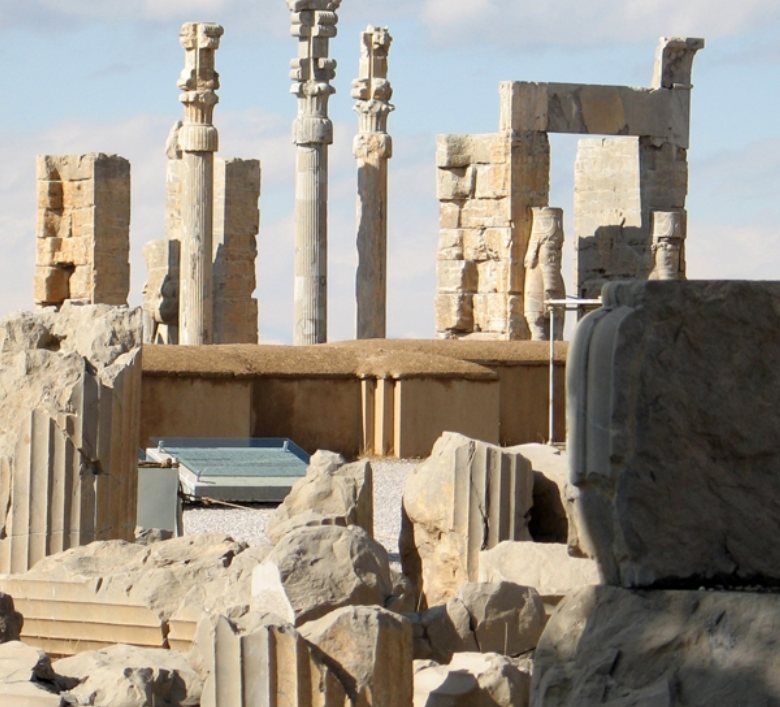

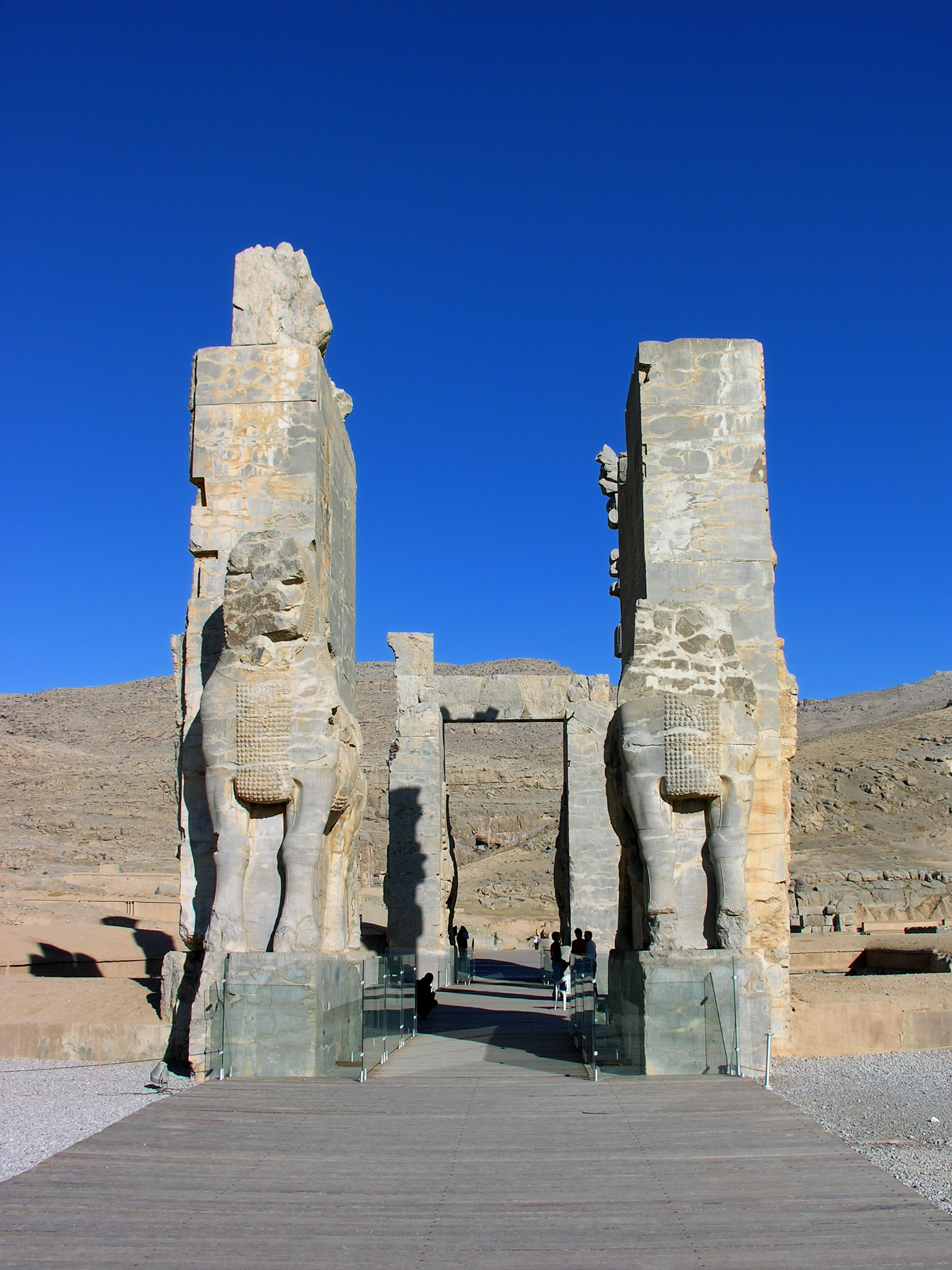

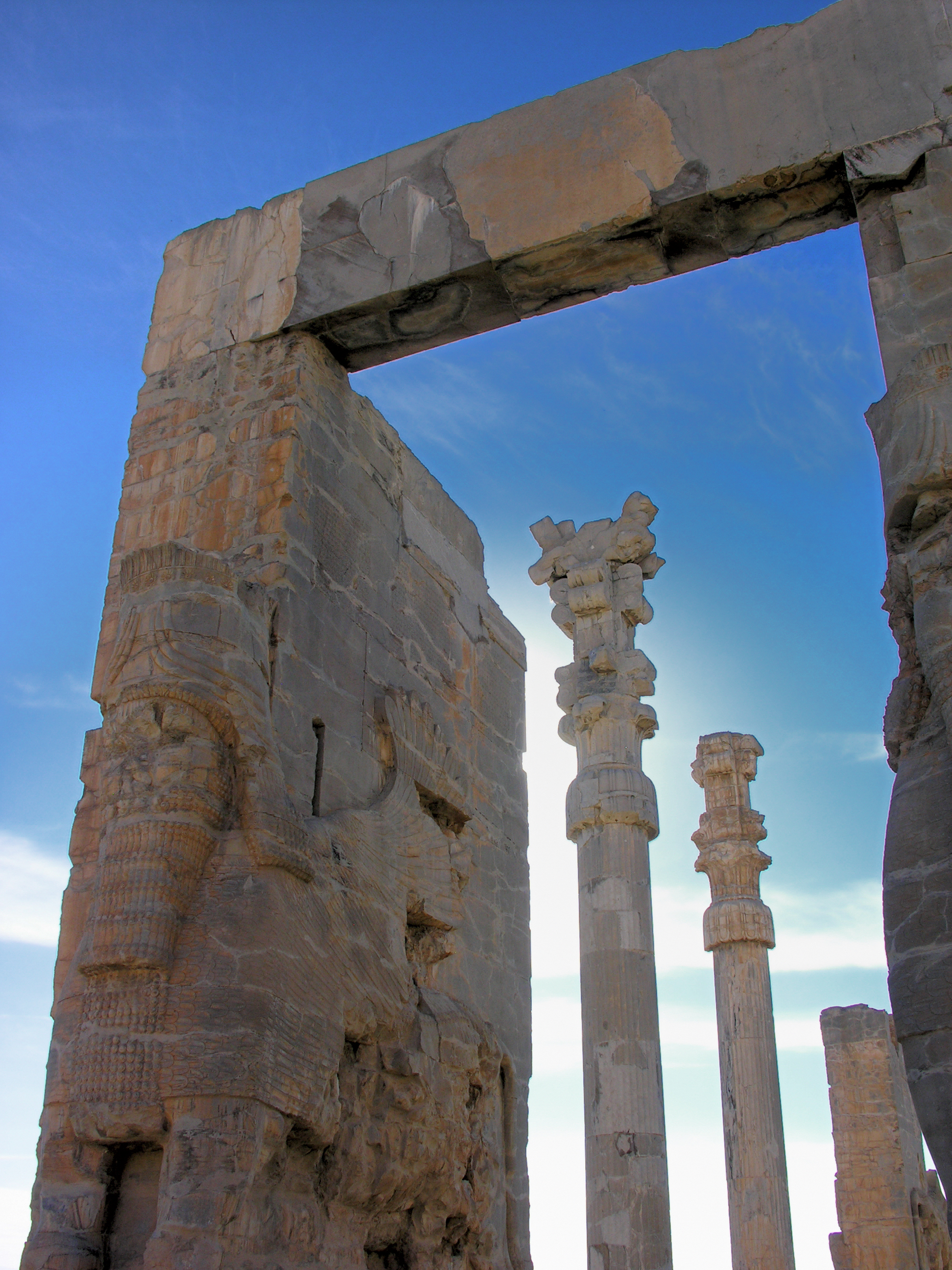

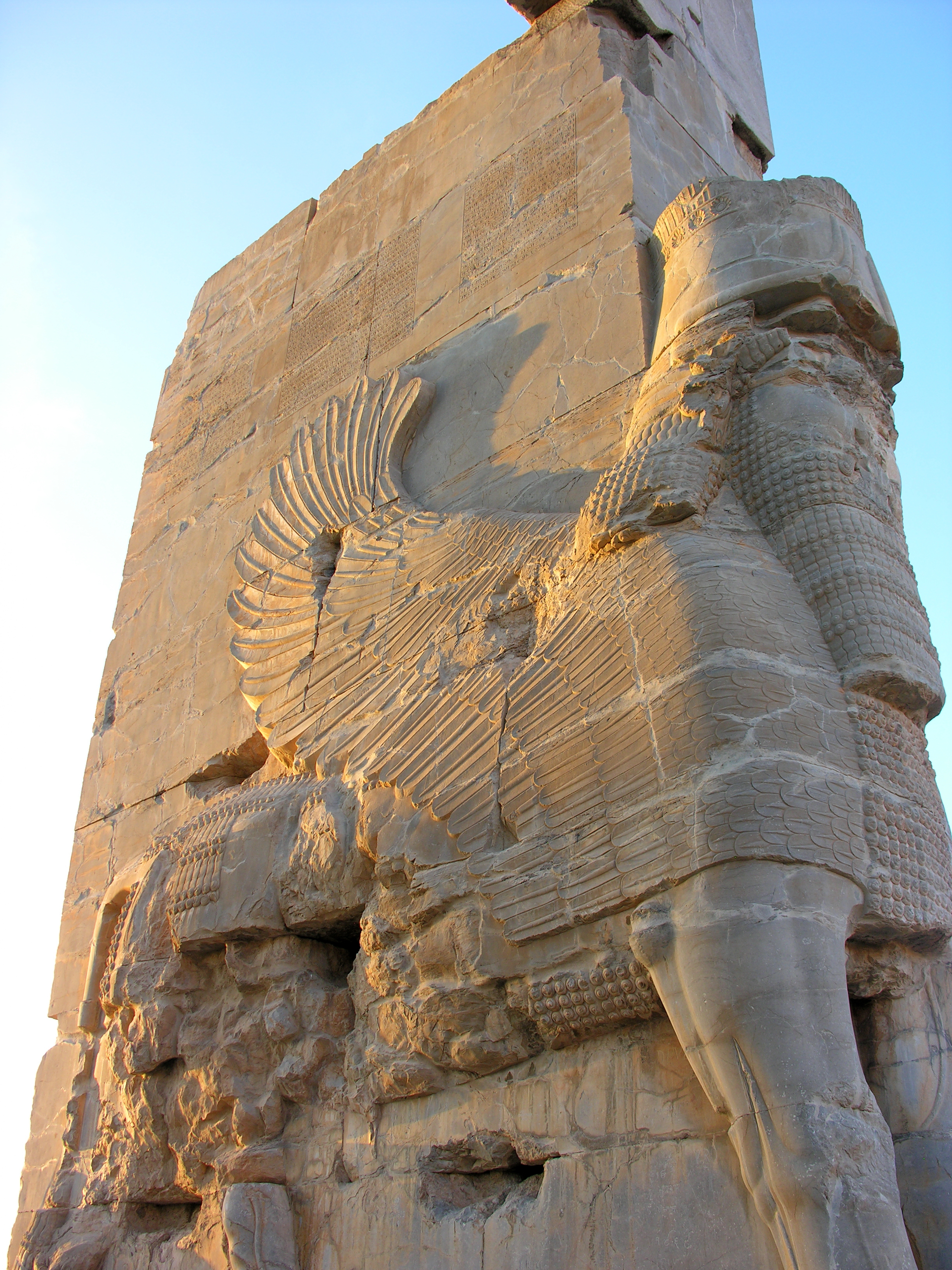

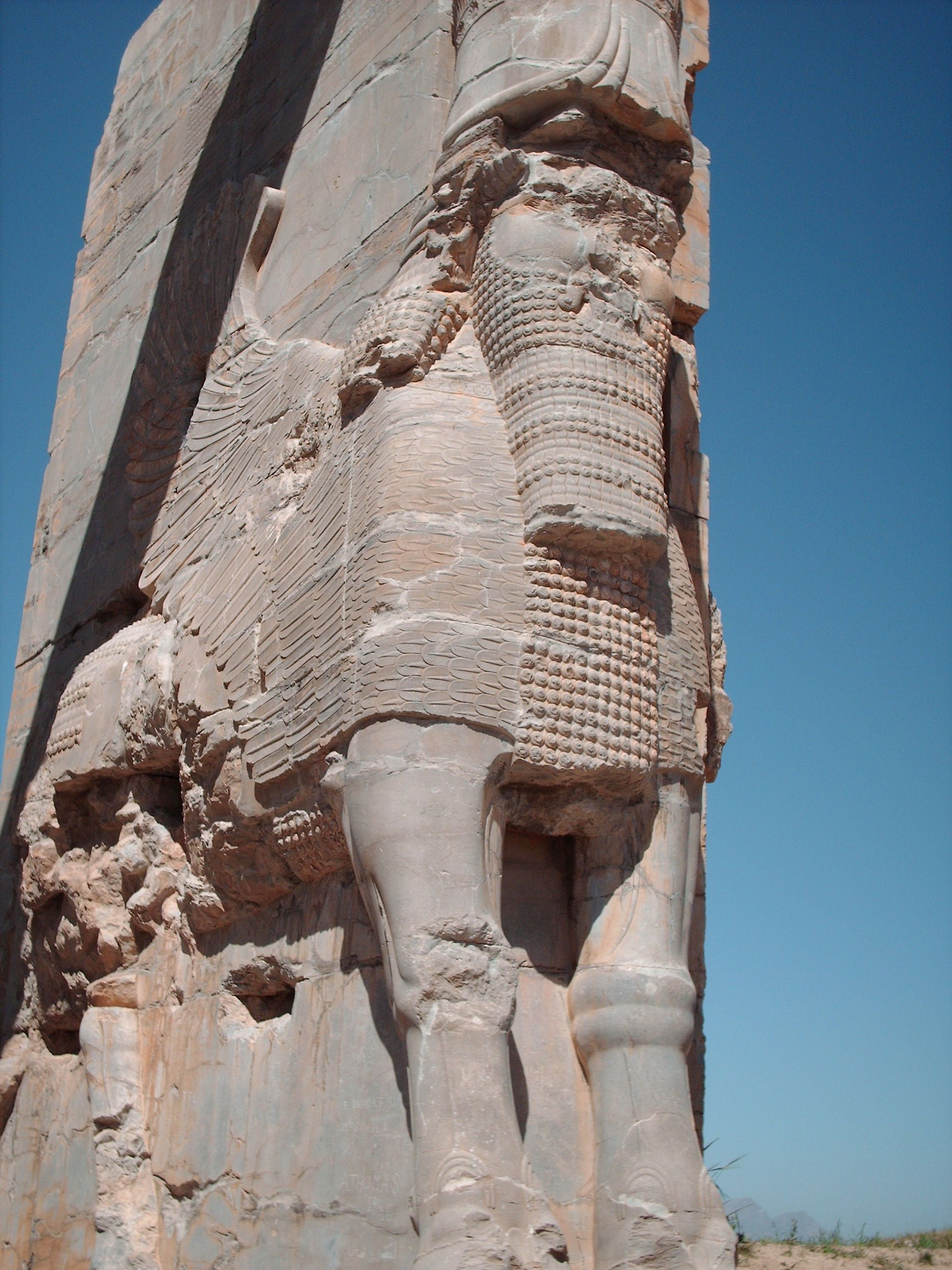
Closeup of a Lamassu on the Gate

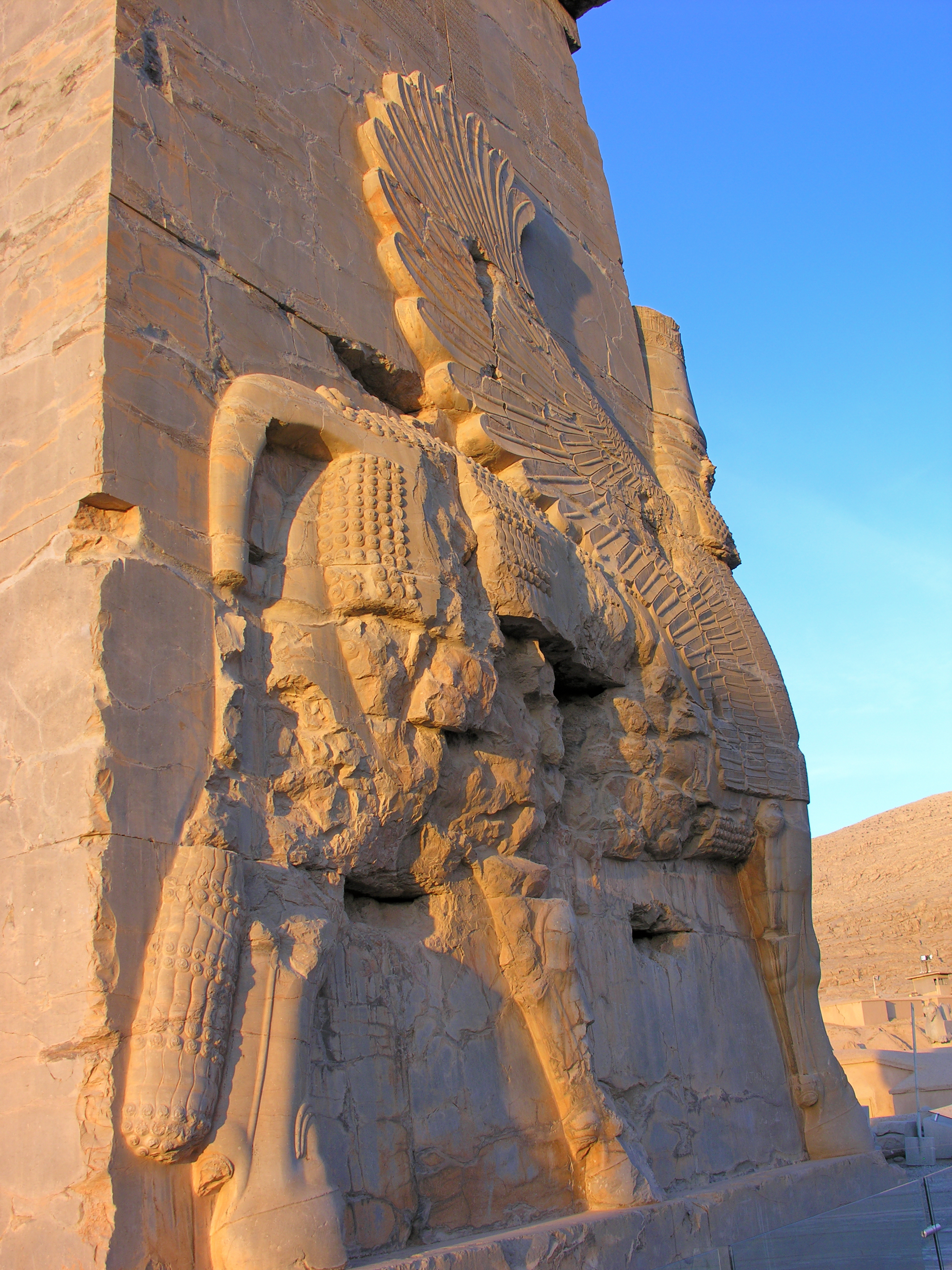
